= Bazavluk Sich =

1593-1638 Zaporizhian Cossack political entity

Coordinates: 47.52450°N 34.23250°E

Bazavluk Sich Базавлуцька Січ (Ukrainian)
- 1593–1638
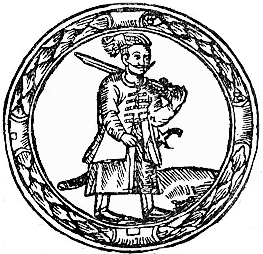
- Flag Coat of arms

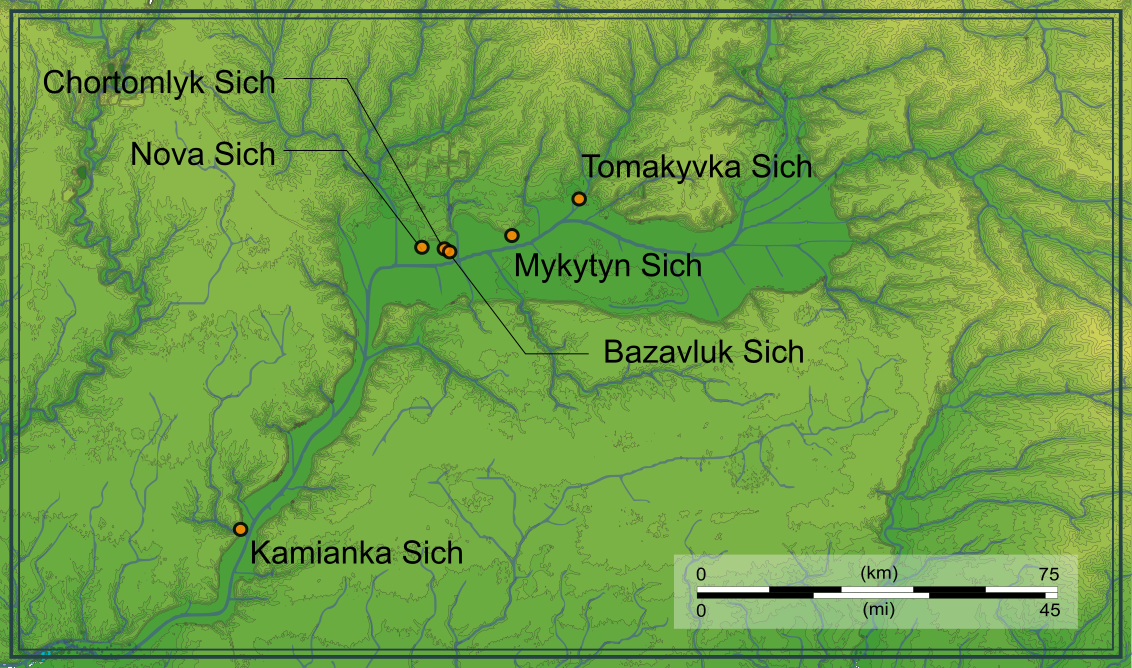
- Siches of the Great Meadow.
- Status: Cossack host
- Capital: Bazavluk Island
- Common languages: Middle Ukrainian
- Religion: Eastern Orthodoxy
- Government: Republic
- Cossack otaman
- History
  - establishment: 1593
  - transfer: 1638
- Currency: All European currencies
Preceded by	Succeeded by
Tomakivka Sich	Mykytyn Sich

Bazavluk Sich or Bazavlutska Sich (Ukrainian: Базавлуцька Січ, romanized: Bazavlutsjka Sich) was a Zaporizhian Sich, an administrative and military centre of the Zaporizhian Cossacks from 1593 to 1638. It succeeded the Tomakivka Sich (1540?–1593).

== Name ==
The etymology of the name remains unclear. Some researchers derive the name from the Turkic *bazuk, *buzuk (Turkish: bazyk) meaning "spoilt water". The name was formed using the Turkic suffix *-lyk.

== Location ==
The sich was situated on the island of Bazavluk, near the present-day village of Kapulivka. There, three rivers flowed into the Dnipro: the Bazavluk, the Pidpilna and the Skarbna. The sich was located on the elevated part of the island, to make the terrain inaccessible to Turks and Tatars. The island's territory was revealed once more following the flooding in July 2023 caused by the destruction of the Kakhovka Dam.

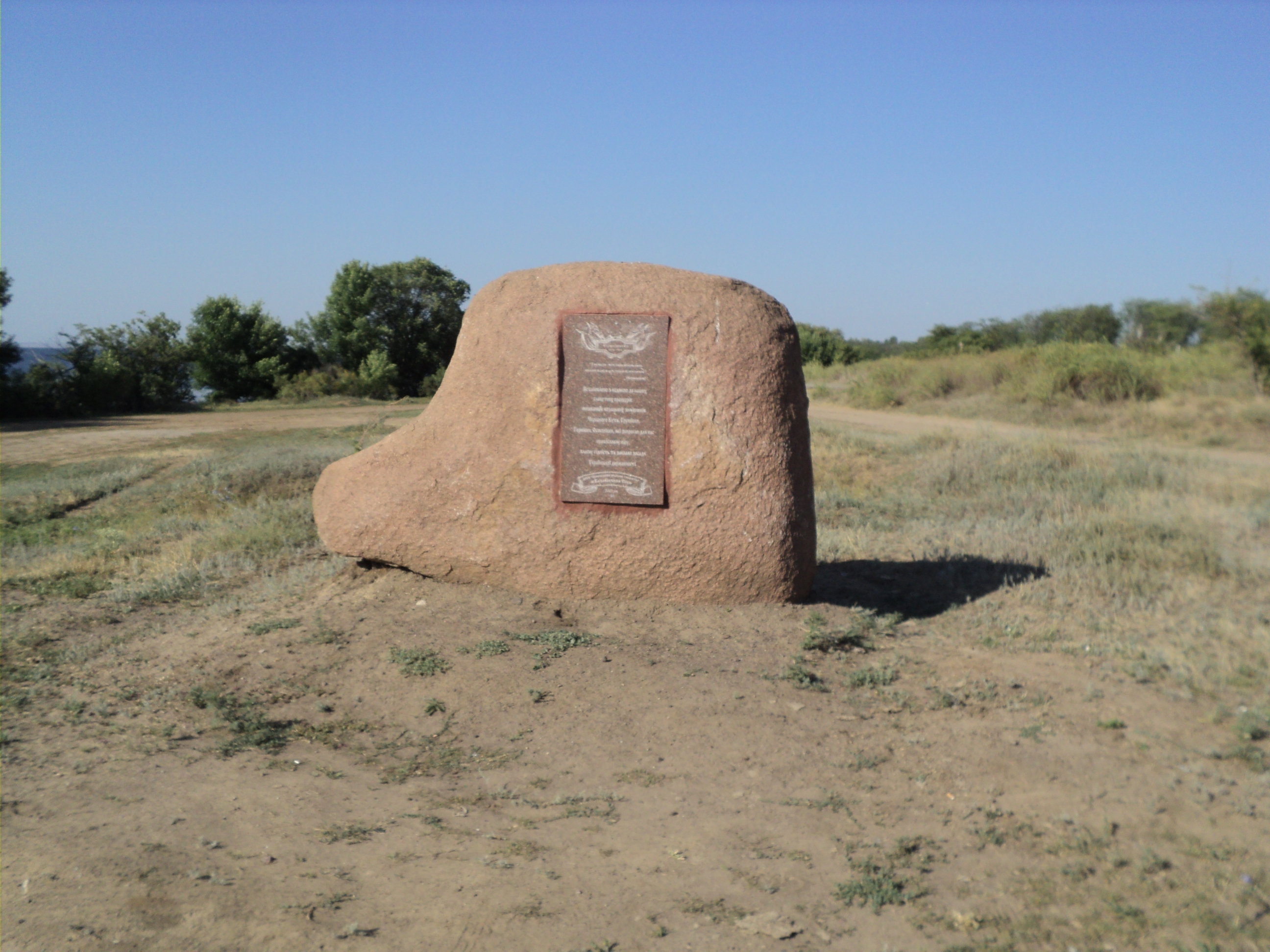
A commemorative plaque to the Bazavluk Sich in Hrushivka (Illinka), on the left as one leaves the causeway across the Kakhovka Reservoir

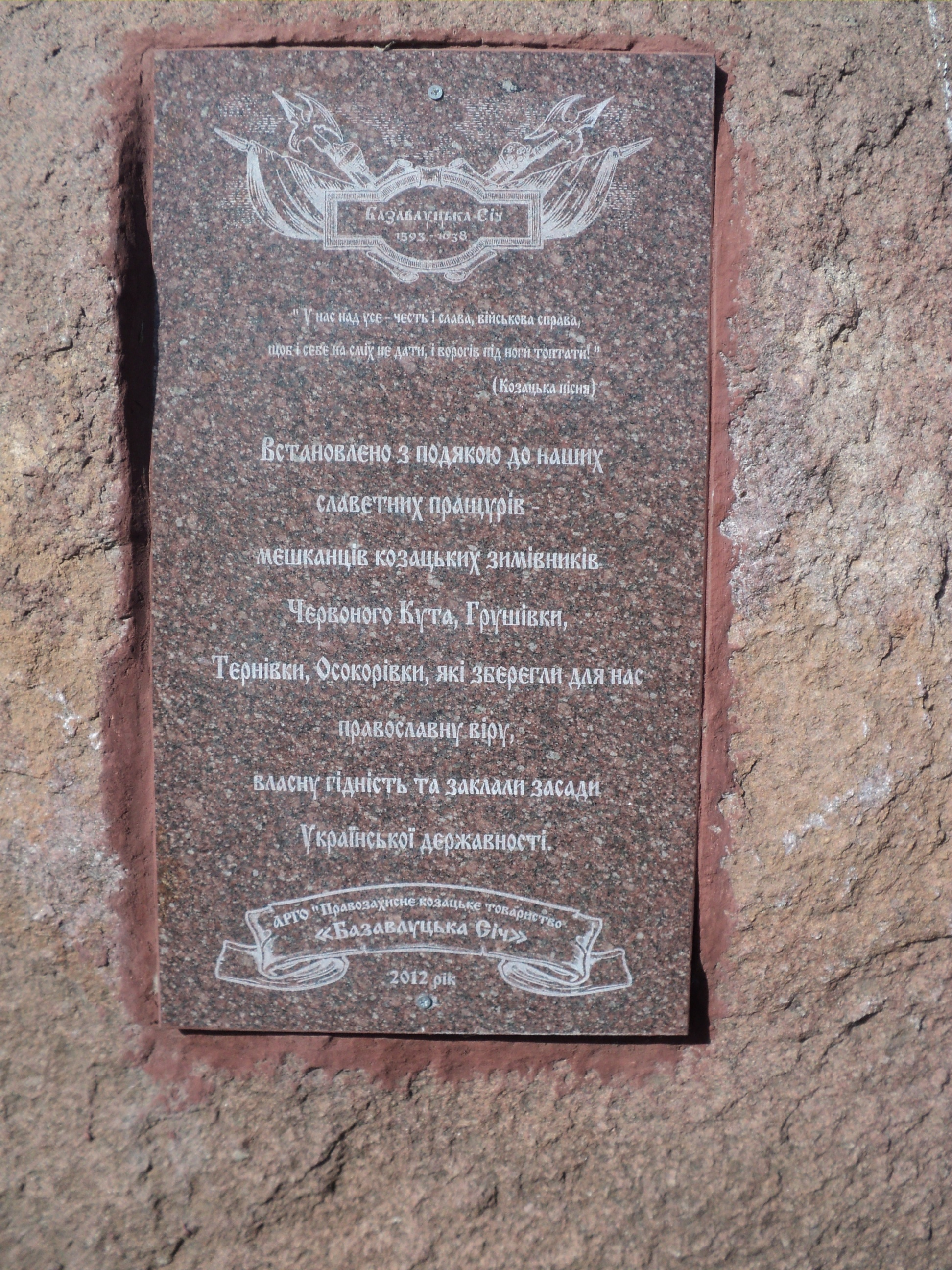
Information plaque on the commemorative monument (both pictured in 2012)

The area around the Bazavluk Sich, known since ancient Greek times as Hylaea (Ancient Greek: Υλαια, romanized: Hulaia, lit. 'the Woodland'), was covered in forest, overgrown with tall grass and reeds, and criss-crossed by numerous rivers, limans and lakes. This hampered the movements of the Tatar cavalry, whilst the Ottoman galleys were easily destroyed by the Cossacks in the labyrinth of rivers and waterways. The Sich was fortified with ramparts, palisades and towers mounted with cannons. At the centre of the Bazavluk Sich stood the square. Near the square stood a church, the house of the kish otaman, Cossack huts and the armoury. Initially, the Sich had huts with walls woven from vines and covered with horse hides to protect against the rain.

== History ==
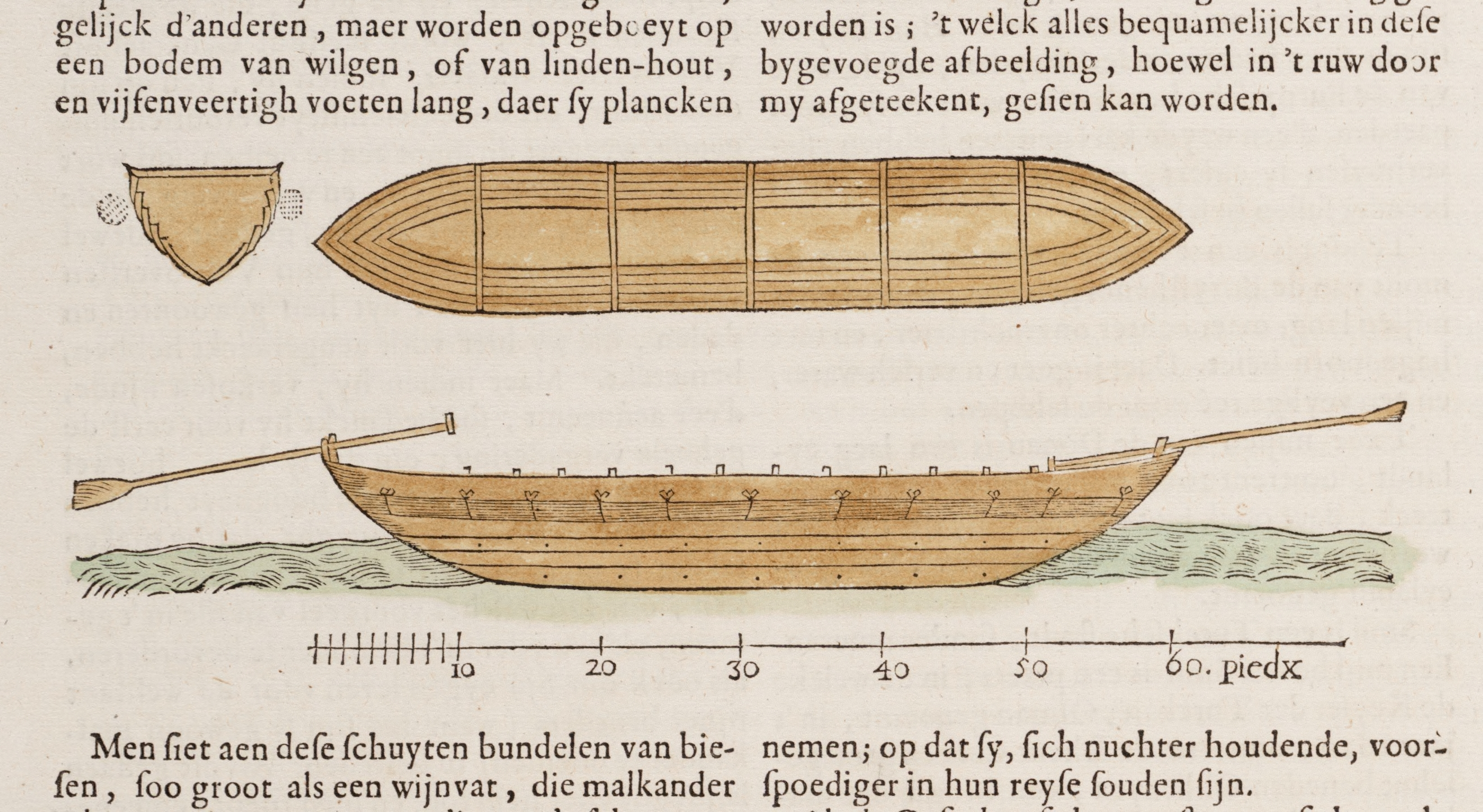
A chaika boat as portrayed in the Dutch edition of the Atlas Maior (1664), an adaptation of Beauplan's 1651 Description of Ukraine in French.

Almost every year, the Cossacks carried out military expeditions from the Bazavluk Sich downstream to Ottomon forts and outposts along the northern coast of the Black Sea. Some of these naval raids involved chaika boats to the shores of Anatolia, commanded by Petro Sahaidachny and Mykhailo Doroshenko.

Towards the end of the 16th century and in the 1620s–1640s, units were formed at the Bazavluk Sich which became the core of the Cossack uprisings led by Severyn Nalyvaiko (Nalyvaiko Uprising, 1594–1596), Marko Zhmaylo (Zhmaylo uprising, 1625), Taras Fedorovych (Trysyla) (Fedorovych uprising, 1630), Ivan Sulyma (Sulyma uprising, 1635), Pavlo Pavliuk, Karpo Skydan, Dmytro Hunia, and Yakiv Ostryanyn (Pavliuk uprising and Ostryanyn uprising, 1637–1638).

Following the suppression of the Cossack-peasant uprisings of 1637–1638, a Polish punitive expedition led by Commissioner K. Meletsky tried to capture the Bazavluk Sich in spring 1638, and re-subject the non-registered Cossacks to royal obedience. The Cossacks repelled the initial Polish assault. After the capitulation of the rebels on the Starka River (August 1638), the Hetman of the Field Crown Mikołaj Potocki with a large army moved to Zaporizhzha and managed to destroy the Bazavluk Sich. The Poles relocated it to Mykytyn Rih, where they established a military garrison, which became the Mykytyn Sich.

In 1956, the Bazavluk Sich area was flooded by water due to the construction of the Kakhovka Reservoir. In June 2023, the destruction of the Kakhovka Dam caused the area of the former sich to be brought back to the surface.

== Research ==
The Bazavluk Sich near the village of Kapulivka, associated with the names of Sahaidachny, Sulyma and Doroshenko, should not be confused with other Sich settlements situated 5–10 km apart:

- Mykytyn Sich (1639–1652), in the old part of modern-day Nikopol, near the ferry crossing over the final rapids, associated with the name of Bohdan Khmelnytsky;
- Tomakivka Sich (1540?–1593), a bit further to the east of Nikopol, also associated with Khmelnytsky in May 1648;
- Chortomlyk Sich (Stara Sich, 1652–1709) near the village of Kapulivka, associated with the name of Ivan Sirko. For a long time, researchers mistakenly linked the Bazavluk Sich with the history of the Chortomlyk Sich, which was even reflected in the name of the nearest railway station, Chortomlyk.

Foreign explorers Bartosz Paprocki, Erich Lassota von Steblau and Guillaume Le Vasseur de Beauplan described its location, topographical features and natural environment in the late 16th and first half of the 17th centuries.

In the 20th century, Dmytro Yavornytsky, Adrian Kashchenko and others wrote about the island of Bazavluk.

== See also ==
- Tomakivka Sich
- Mykytyn Sich
- Chortomlyk Sich (Stara Sich)
- Nova Sich (Pidpilnenska Sich)

== Bibliography ==
- Apanovych, O. (1997). "Базавлуцька Січ" [Bazavlutska Sich]. In Valeriy Smoliy (ed.). Малий словник історії України [Small Dictionary of the History of Ukraine] (in Ukrainian). Kyiv: Lybidj. p. 50. ISBN 5-325-00781-5.
- Dzyra, Yaroslav Ivanovych (2003). "Базавлук" [Bazavluk]. Encyclopedia of History of Ukraine (in Ukrainian). Vol. 1. Kyiv: Institute of History of Ukraine. p. 688. Archived from the original on 10 April 2016.
- Shcherbak, Vitaliy Oleksiyovych (2003). "Базавлуцька Січ" [Bazavlutsjka Sich]. Encyclopedia of History of Ukraine (in Ukrainian). Vol. 1. Kyiv: Institute of History of Ukraine. p. 688. Archived from the original on 20 June 2026.
- Shcherbak, Vitaliy Oleksiyovych (2009). "Микитинська Січ" [Mykytynsjka Sich]. Encyclopedia of History of Ukraine (in Ukrainian). Vol. 6. Kyiv: Institute of History of Ukraine. p. 635. Archived from the original on 20 June 2026.
- Shcherbak, Vitaliy Oleksiyovych (1998). Базавлуцька Січ (1593 – 1638 рр.). Козацькі січі (нариси з історії українського козацтва XVI–XIX ст.) / Valeriy Smoliy (editor-in-chief), V. Shcherbak (scientific editor), Taras Chukhlib (comp.), Oleksandr Ivanovych Hurzhiy, V. Matyakh, Arnold Leonidovych Sokulskyi, Valeriy Stepanovych Stepanov. Kyiv; Zaporizhzhia: Institute of History of Ukraine, National Academy of Sciences of Ukraine; Scientific Research Institute of the Cossacks. p. 25. Archived from the original on 6 September 2021. (link )
- Shcherbak, Vitaliy Oleksiyovych (2011). "Запорозька Січ на Базавлуці" [The Zaporizhian Sich at Bazavluk]. НАУКОВІ ЗАПИСКИ НаУКМА. Випуск 117. Історичні науки [Scientific Notes. Issue 117. Historical Sciences] (PDF) (in Ukrainian). Kyiv: National University of Kyiv-Mohyla Academy. pp. 4–10. Archived from the original on 23 March 2022.)
- Hajdaj, Lidiya Ivanivna (2000). Історія України в особах, термінах, назвах і поняття [The History of Ukraine: People, Terms, Names and Concepts]. Lutsk: Vezha. p. 436. ISBN 9789667294410.
- Shcherbak, Vitaliy Oleksiyovych (2006). "Базавлуцька та Микитинська Січі" [The Bazavlutska and Mykytynska Siches]. In Valeriy Smoliy (ed.). The History of the Ukrainian Cossacks: Essays in 2 vols. Vol. 1. Kyiv: National University of Kyiv-Mohyla Academy. p. 800.
- Dmytro Yavornytsky (1990) [1892]. Історія запорізьких козаків [The History of the Zaporizhian Cossacks] (in Ukrainian). Vol. 1. Lviv: Publishing house Svit. pp. 47–71.
- Yanko, Mykola (1998). "Базавлук" [Bazavluk]. Топонімічний словник України : Словник-довідник [Toponymic Dictionary of Ukraine: A Reference Dictionary] (in Ukrainian). Kyiv: Znannja. p. 430. ISBN 5-7707-9443-7.
