= Tomakivka Sich =

16th century Zaporizhian Cossack political entity

Tomakivka Sich Томаківська січ (Ukrainian)
- 1540(?)–1593
- Flag Coat of arms

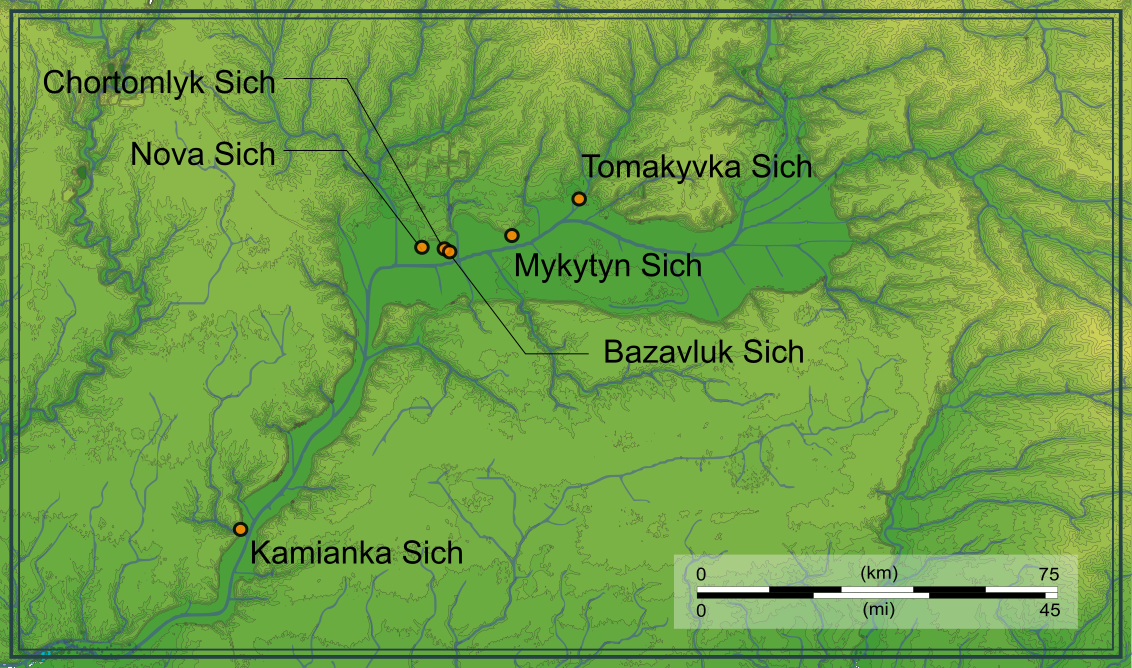
- Siches of the Great Meadow.
- Status: Cossack host
- Common languages: Middle Ukrainian
- Religion: Eastern Orthodoxy
- Government: Republic
- Cossack otaman
- History
  - establishment: 1540(?)
  - transfer: 1593
- Currency: All European currencies
| Preceded by | Succeeded by |
| Kyiv Voivodeship | Bazavluk Sich |

The Tomakivka Sich or Tomakivska Sich (Note: Ukrainian: Томаківська січ, romanized: Tomakivsjka Sich.) was a fortification built by the Zaporizhian Cossacks on the island of Tomakivka on the Dnipro near the present-day rural settlement of Chervonohryhorivka and the city Marhanets, probably existed from 1540 until 1593, when it was destroyed by the Crimean Tatars. The Tomakivka Sich was the earliest of the known siches in the Great Meadow of Ukraine.

== Origins ==
The sich was founded on Tomakivka, the second-largest island (after Khortytsia) on the Lower Dnipro. The first Sich mentioned in the chronicles is Tomakivska; — it was precisely this island, which at that time was still home only to a settlement, that Marcin Bielski wrote about to Carlo Gambellini, the secretary to the papal nuncio in the Polish-Lithuanian Commonwealth, in 1584:

There are plenty of trees there, and they [the Cossacks] are so skilled at defending themselves with stockades that even in winter, when the Dnipro freezes over, they fear no enemy; for added security, they cut through the ice all around.

The fortifications and the Cossack Rada of that time are described by Bartosz Paprocki in his account of a Polish nobleman Samuel Zborowski. The Sich Cossacks took part in Ukraine's largest Kosiński uprising of 1591–1593, led by Krzysztof Kosiński.

Following the destruction of the Sich by the Tatars in 1593, the Zaporizhian Cossacks moved to the island of Bazavluk and founded the Bazavluk Sich.

According to Mykola Kostomarov, at the end of 1647, following a failed attempt to raise an uprising in the town of Lebedyn, the Chyhyryn centurion Bohdan Khmelnytsky fled here, together with his eldest son Tymofiy Khmelnytsky and 15 Cossacks. It thus became a site of the early phase of the 1648 Khmelnytsky Uprising.

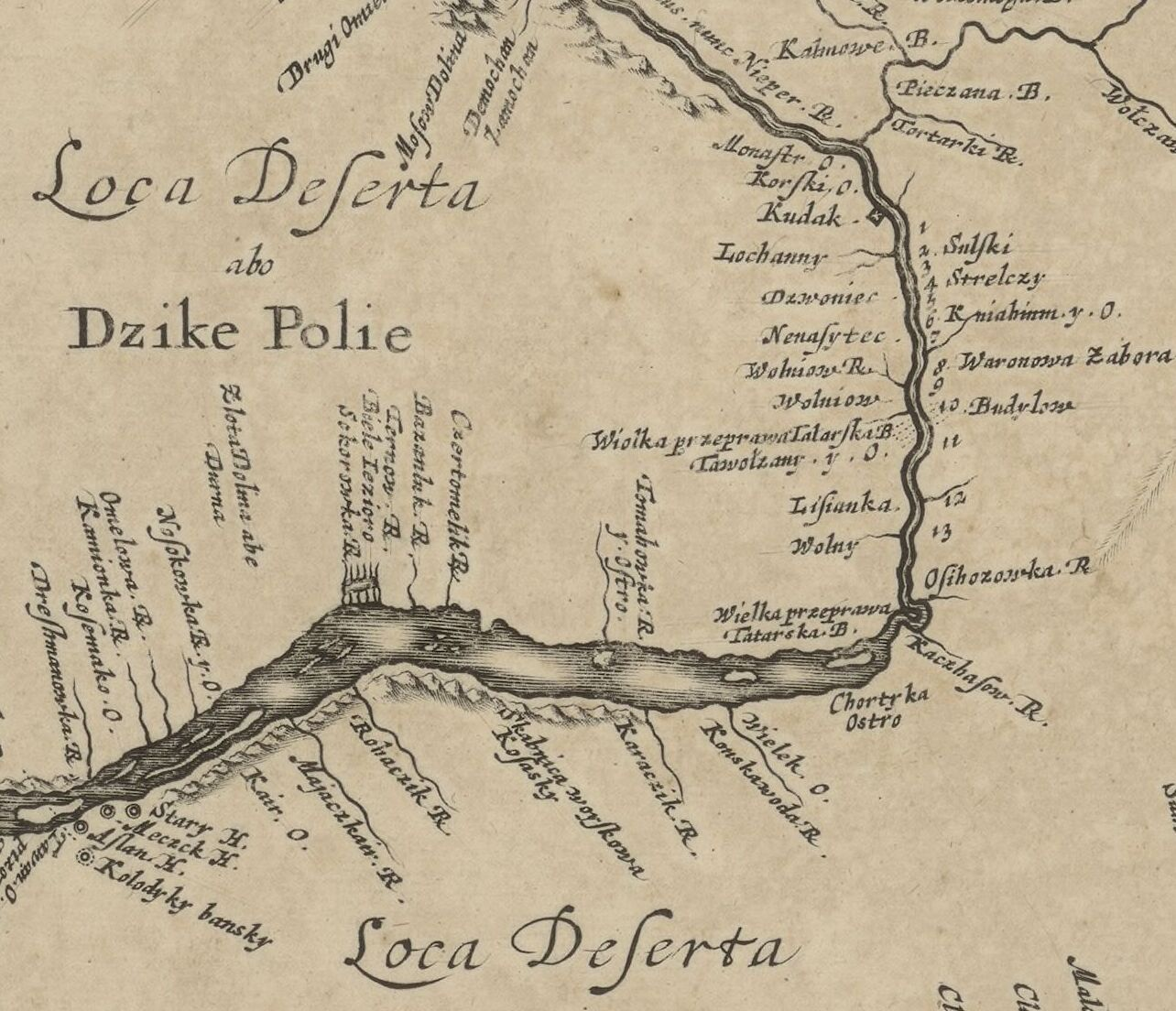
In the middle: Tomahowka R. y. Ostro ("Tomakivka River and Island"). Typus generalis Ukrainae (1648) by Beauplan.

In his 1660 Description of Ukraine, Beauplan wrote:

Tomahowka [Tomakivka] is an island about the third part of a league diameter, or thereabouts, almost round, very high and lofty, like a half globe, all covered with woods. From the top of it may be seen all the Nieper [Dnipro] from Chortika [Khortytsia] to Taman. This island is very pleasant, I could not learn after what manner the banks of it are, but that it is nearer Russia [Red Ruthenia in right-bank Ukraine] than Tartary [the Crimean Khanate in left-bank Ukraine]. Ckemislky [Khmelnytsky] had made choice of this place for his retreat when he was threatened with a siege, and it was there they began to rendez-vouz when they rebelled and took the field in May 1648, and won the battle on the 26th of May near Korsun.

— Guillaume Le Vasseur de Beauplan, Description of Ukraine (1660; adapted from the 1704 English translation).

During the construction of the Kakhovka Reservoir in the 1950s, the island of Tomakivka was partially flooded. A memorial plaque was erected in the 1990s, and in 2016, on the western edge of the beach recreation area on the eroding shore of the Kakhovka Reservoir (coordinates 47°37′13″N 34°35′22″E), the so-called 'reconstruction of the Sich', which was actually intended to be situated further north, on top of a 47-metre-high hill.

Outside the Sich, opposite it across the former Revun channel of the Dnipro, there was a trading town, later the village of Horodyshche (now within the boundaries of the city of Marhanets), in the area of Revun Lane and Kolhospna Street.

== See also ==
- Chortomlyk Sich
- Kamianka Sich
- Nova Sich
- Zaporizhzhian Sich

== Bibliography ==
- Hurbyk, Andriy Oleksandrovych (2013). "Томаківська січ" [Tomakivsjka sich]. Encyclopedia of History of Ukraine (in Ukrainian). Vol. 10. Kyiv: Institute of History of Ukraine. p. 121. Archived from the original on 19 June 2026.
- Томаківська Січ // Encyclopedia of Ukrainian Studies : Dictionary part : [in 11 vols.] / Shevchenko Scientific Society ; editor-in-chief prof., Dr. Volodymyr Kubiyovych . — Paris — New York : Young Life , 1980. — Book 2, [vol. 9] : Tymoshenko — Khmelnytskyi Bohdan. — ISBN 5-7707-4049-3.
- Hurbyk A. Томаківська Січ (Tomakivska Sich) // Small Dictionary of the History of Ukraine / editor-in-chief V. A. Smolii. Kyiv: Lybid, 1997. 464 p. ISBN 5-325-00781-5.
- Hurbyk A., Томаківська Січ (Томаківська Січ 70-і роки XVI ст. — 1593 рр.) // Cossack Sichs (Essays on the History of the Ukrainian Cossacks, 16th–19th Centuries) / Valerii Andriiovych Smolii (ed.), Vitalii Oleksiiovych Shcherbak (scientific editor), Taras Chukhlib (comp.), Oleksandr Ivanovych Gurzhiy, V. Matyakh, Arnold Leonidovych Sokulskyi, Valeriy Stepanovych Stepanov. — Institute of History of Ukraine, National Academy of Sciences of Ukraine; Research Institute of the Cossacks. — Kyiv; Zaporizhzhia, 1998. — pp. 22–44.
