= Mykytyn Sich =

Coordinates: 47°33′06″N 34°24′27″E

Mykytyn Sich Микитинська Січ
- 1638–1652
- Flag Coat of arms

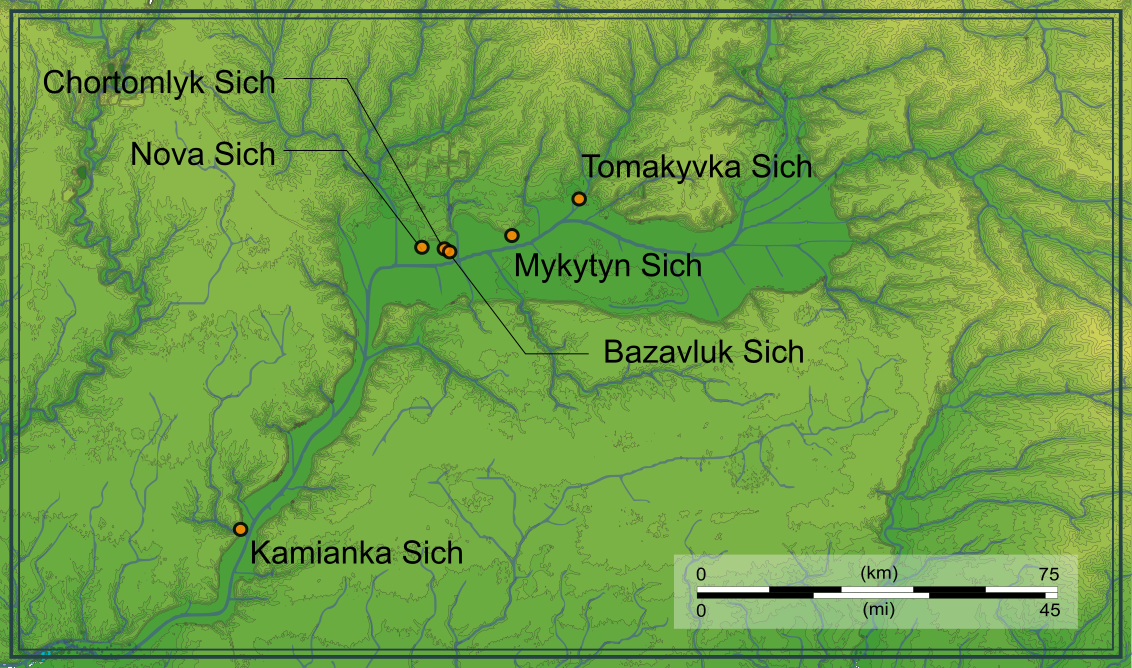
- Siches of the Great Meadow.
- Status: Cossack Host
- Capital: Mykytyn Rih
- Common languages: Middle Ukrainian
- Religion: Orthodox Christianity
- Government: Republic
- Kish otaman
- History
  - Establishment: 1638
  - Transfer: 1652
- Currency: All European currencies
Preceded by	Succeeded by
Bazavluk Sich	Chortomlyk Sich

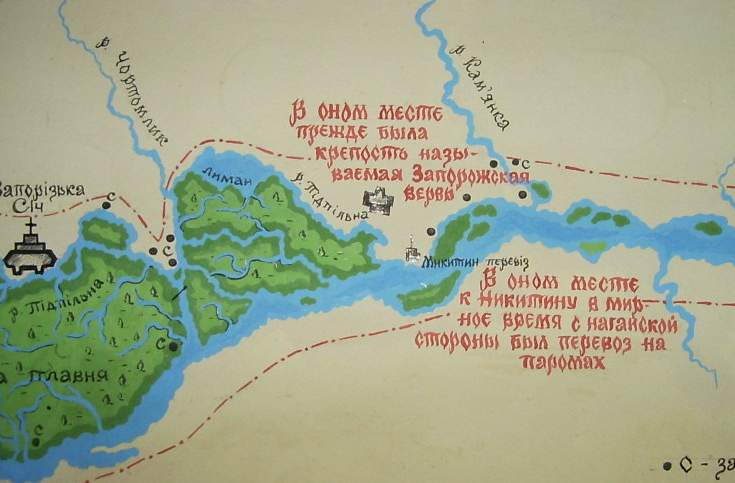
Mykytyn ferry – the site of the Mykytyn Sich

The Mykytyn Sich or Mykytynska Sich (Ukrainian: Микитинська Січ, romanized: Mykytynsjka Sich) was the administrative and military centre of the Zaporizhian Cossacks from 1638 to 1652. It was situated at Mykytyn Rih (lit. 'Mykyta's Cape'; present-day Nikopol, Ukraine), near the ancient crossing over the Dnipro. It was relocated here by the government of the Polish–Lithuanian Commonwealth following the suppression of the Cossack–peasant uprisings of 1637–1638, with the establishment of a Polish garrison.

== History ==
=== Origins ===
In the history of Ukraine, the Mykytyn Zaporizhian Sich is one of the most famous, as it is associated with the start of the Khmelnytsky Uprising in the mid-17th century, which led to the rise of the Ukrainian Cossack Hetmanate. At the same time, there are very few historical sources about it to provide precise details of when it was founded and where it was located.

The Mykytyn Sich was established with the permission of the Polish-Lithuanian Commonwealth, which recognised the need to defend its southern border. At the end of 1638, the government of the Polish-Lithuanian Commonwealth approved the 'Ordinance of the Zaporizhian Army', recognising a separate status for Zaporizhzhia. Although following the defeat of the Bazavluk Sich, a significant proportion of the Zaporozhian Cossacks headed for the Don (which was then unclaimed territory), the Polish–Lithuanian authorities still needed a defence of the southern border, and therefore a Cossack garrison was preserved. The location of this garrison would become the Mykytyn Rih. According to Polish chronicler S. Dziewowicz, the construction of fortifications at Mykytyn Rih began in the spring of 1639 and was completed in the autumn of 1639 under the leadership of Fedir Lutay (Федір Лутай) or Lynchay (Линчай) – the first otaman-hetman of the Mykytyn Sich. His garrison of Cossacks was thus known as Lynchaïntsi (Ukrainian: линчаїнці, romanized: lynčajinci).

In 1640, during the Siege of Azov (1637–1642), several hundred Cossacks from the Mykytyn Sich arrived there to help defend the fortress of Azov against attacks from the Ottoman Empire. Ottoman traveller Evliya Çelebi, reportedly an eyewitness to the battle for Azov (Azak), wrote in Seyahatnâme about their resourcefulness and courage.

=== Khmelnytsky Uprising ===
The Mykytyn Sich was the initial centre of the Khmelnytsky Uprising: it was here that Bohdan Khmelnytsky arrived in autumn 1647, was elected hetman in mid-February 1648, and it was from here that, on 22 April 1648, he set out at the head of a Cossack detachment to fight the Poles.

The Hrabianka Chronicle, recounting Khmelnytsky's flight to Zaporizhzhia in December 1647, notes: "First he made his way to the island of Buchky, and then fled to Mykytyn Rih, where he found three hundred Cossacks; he told them about himself, about everything the Poles and Cossacks were plotting to do, and about the desecration they were committing not only against the Cossacks but also against the Lord's churches." On 4 February 1648 (O.S. 25 January 1648), a detachment of rebels led by Khmelnytsky seized the Mykytyna Sich. He was aided in this by Cossacks from the Cherkasy Registered Cossacks Regiment, who were stationed there to monitor Tatar crossings of the Dnipro. On 9 February, he repelled an attack by government forces. The uprising swept across all of Lower Ukraine, where Bohdan Khmelnytsky 'defeated all the Polish soldiers and German mercenaries (who were stationed in the Zaporizhian region)'.

Khmelnytsky went on to conclude an alliance with the Crimean Khanate, and win the battles of Zhovti Vody and Korsuń in April and May 1648. However, when the Treaty of Zboriv was concluded with Poland in 1649, a group of Cossacks led by Ya. Khulody disagreed with the terms, and started a revolt on the Mykytyn Sich. The revolt was quelled by Khmelnytsky, who reduced the Mykytyn Sich to a border outpost.

=== End ===
In 1652, the Zaporizhian Cossacks moved their Sich from Mykytyn Rih to the Chortomlyk, establishing the Chortomlyk Sich there. The reason for moving the Sich from Mykytyn Rih to the mouth of the Chortomlyk was strategic disadvantages (the high ground and the fact that it was almost completely exposed on three sides).

In 1830s, during a major spring flood, the site of the Mykytyn Sich was cut off from the riverbank and swept downstream along the Dnipro.

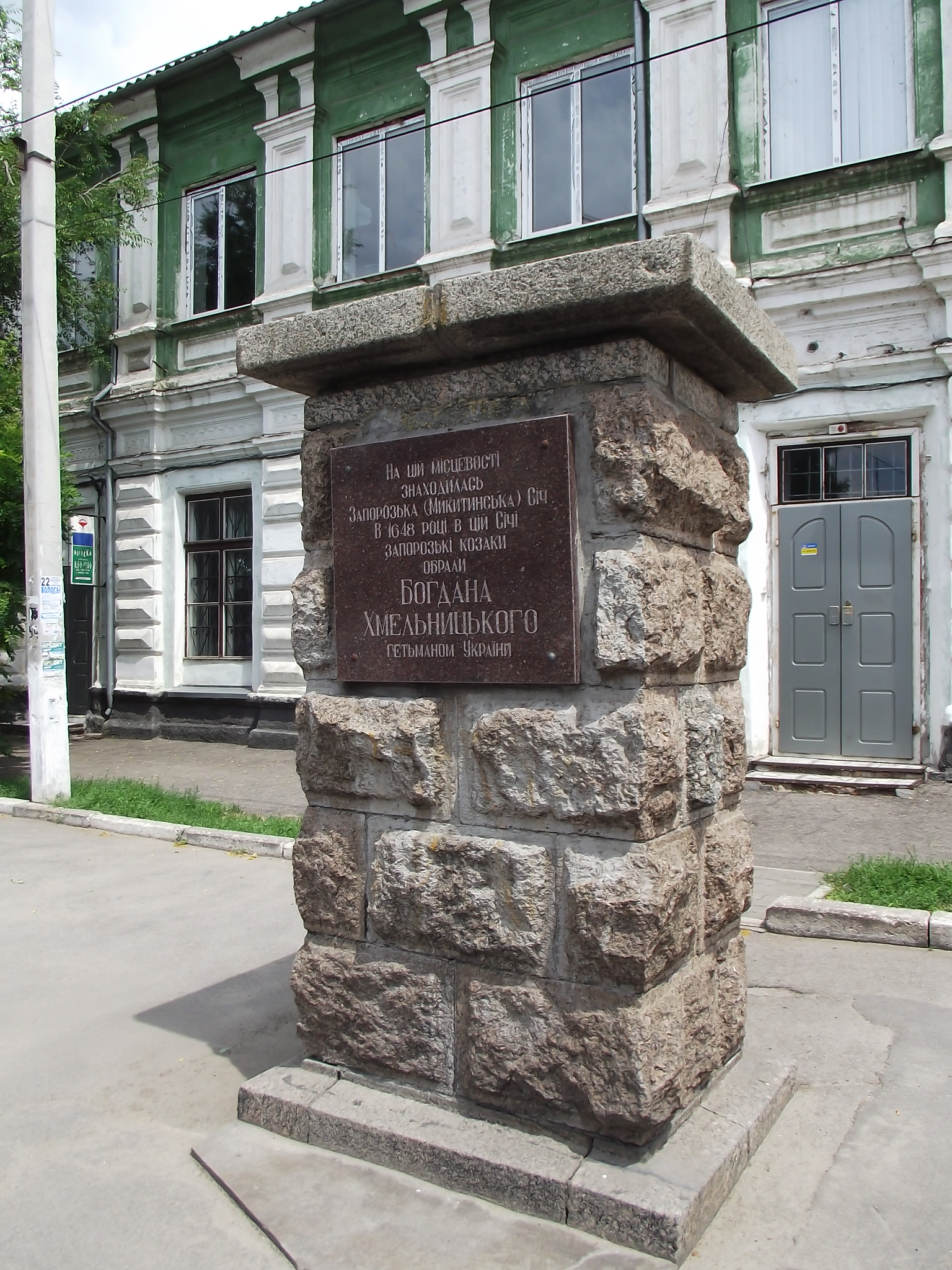
The site of the Mykytyn Sich, where Bohdan Khmelnytsky was elected Hetman of the Zaporizhian Host. Nikopol, 40 Mykytynska Street

== Bibliography ==
=== Primary sources ===
- Hrabianka Chronicle (c. 1710). (in Ukrainian Church Slavonic).
  - Hrabianka, Hrihorii (1992). "Частина 1. Літопис гадяцького полковника Григорія Грабянки" [Part 1. The Chronicle of Hadiach Colonel Hryhorii Hrabianka]. Izbornyk (in Ukrainian). Translated by R. H. Ivanchenko. "Та спершу усіх жовнірів польських та німців-найманців (що залогою на Запоріжжі стояли) винищив, а вже потім відрядив гінця в Крим до хана Іслам-Гирея."

=== Literature ===
- Shcherbak, Vitaliy Oleksiyovych (2009). "Микитинська Січ" [Mykytynsjka Sich]. Encyclopedia of History of Ukraine (in Ukrainian). Vol. 6. Kyiv: Institute of History of Ukraine. p. 635. Archived from the original on 20 June 2026.
- Stepankov, Valery Stepanovych (2013). "Хмельницький Богдан" [Bohdan Khmelnytsky]. Encyclopedia of History of Ukraine (in Ukrainian). Vol. 10. Kyiv: Institute of History of Ukraine. p. 635. Archived from the original on 21 June 2026.
- Chukhlib, Taras (1998). Микитинська Січ (1639 – 1652 рр.) [Mykytynsjka Sich (1639–1652)]. Козацькі січі (нариси з історії українського козацтва XVI–XIX ст.) / Valeriy Smoliy (editor-in-chief), V. Shcherbak (scientific editor), Taras Chukhlib (comp.), Oleksandr Ivanovych Hurzhiy, V. Matyakh, Arnold Leonidovych Sokulskyi, Valeriy Stepanovych Stepanov. Kyiv; Zaporizhzhia: Institute of History of Ukraine, National Academy of Sciences of Ukraine; Scientific Research Institute of the Cossacks. p. 65–85.
- Берест Дан. Запорозька січ.
- Жуковський М. П. Про час заснування і місце розташування Микитинської Запорозької Січі.
- Apanovych, O. (1997). "Микитинська Січ" [Mykytynsjka Sich)]. In Valeriy Smoliy (ed.). Малий словник історії України [Small Dictionary of the History of Ukraine] (in Ukrainian). Kyiv: Lybidj. p. 254. ISBN 5-325-00781-5.
- Shcherbak, Vitaliy Oleksiyovych (2006). "Базавлуцька та Микитинська Січі" [The Bazavlutska and Mykytynska Sich] (in Ukrainian). Archived from the original on 22 April 2009.
- Hrybovskyi, Vladyslav (5 October 2020) [10 October 2018]. Микитин Ріг – Нікополь: з чого починалося місто [Mykytyn Rih – Nikopol: what did the city start from]. Dnipro Kultura (in Ukrainian). Archived from the original on 9 February 2026.
