= Sich =

Administrative and military centre of the Zaporizhian Cossacks

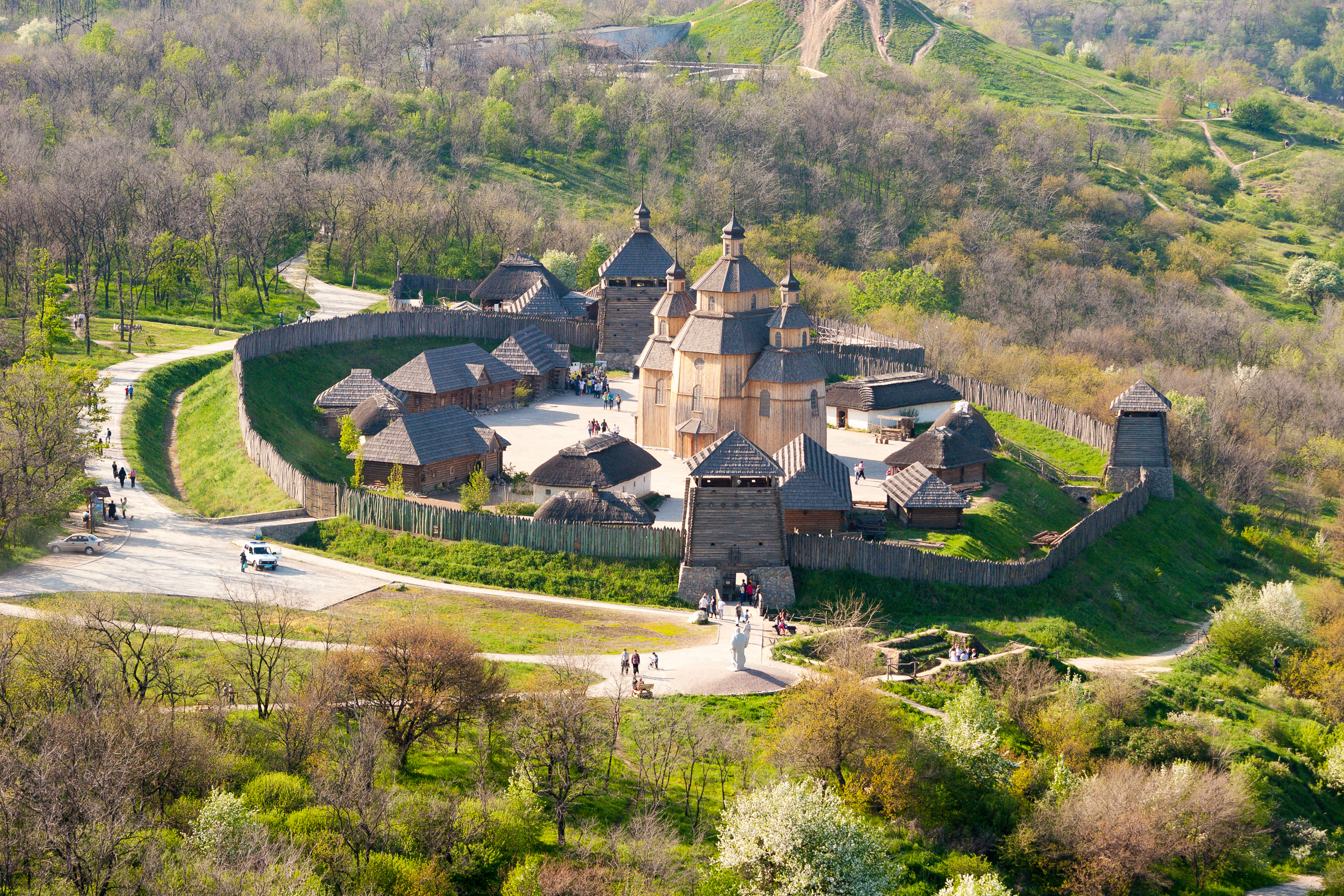
Reconstructed Zaporozhian Sich complex on the Khortytsia Island.

A sich (Ukrainian: січ [sʲit͡ʃ], s(y)itch, plural січі, sichi; English plural: sichs, sichy or siches) was an administrative and military centre of the Zaporozhian Cossacks. The word sich derives from the Ukrainian verb сікти sikty, "to chop" – with the implication of clearing a forest for an encampment or of building a fortification with the trees that have been chopped down. According to Serhii Plokhy, a Sich is "a fortified settlement, [named] after the wooden palisade that protected it".

The Zaporozhian Sich was the fortified capital of the Zaporozhian Cossacks, located on an island in the Dnieper beyond the rapids (za porohamy, hence Zaporizhia), in the 16th–18th centuries in the area of what is now Ukraine. The Sich was moved (or transferred) several times to different islands. At times, there were multiple inhabited siches simultaneously. Nevertheless, the entire phenomenon, or all siches collectively, are commonly called "the Zaporizhian Sich". The Sich was often used as a staging ground for raiding expeditions to the Black Sea.

The Sich Rada was the highest organ of government in the Zaporozhian Host, or army of the Zaporozhian Cossacks. It functioned as a democracy, with an elected leader, the kish otaman. The Danubian Sich was the fortified settlement of those Zaporozhian Cossacks who later settled in the Danube Delta.

In 1917, the Sich Riflemen were named after the erstwhile Zaporizhian Sich. The Carpathian Sich was the irregular military of the short-lived state of Carpatho-Ukraine (1938–1939).

== Other transcriptions ==
- Jeremiah Curtin (1898) – Saitch
- Samuel Binion (1898) – Sich
- Beatrice Baskerville (1907) – Setch
- Isabel Hepgood (1915) and Israel Friedlander (1916) – Syech
- Harold Lamb (1917) – Siech
- William Penn Cresson (1919) – Sitch
- Lesley Blanch (1960) and Frank Herbert's novel Dune (1965) – Sietch

== List of sichs ==
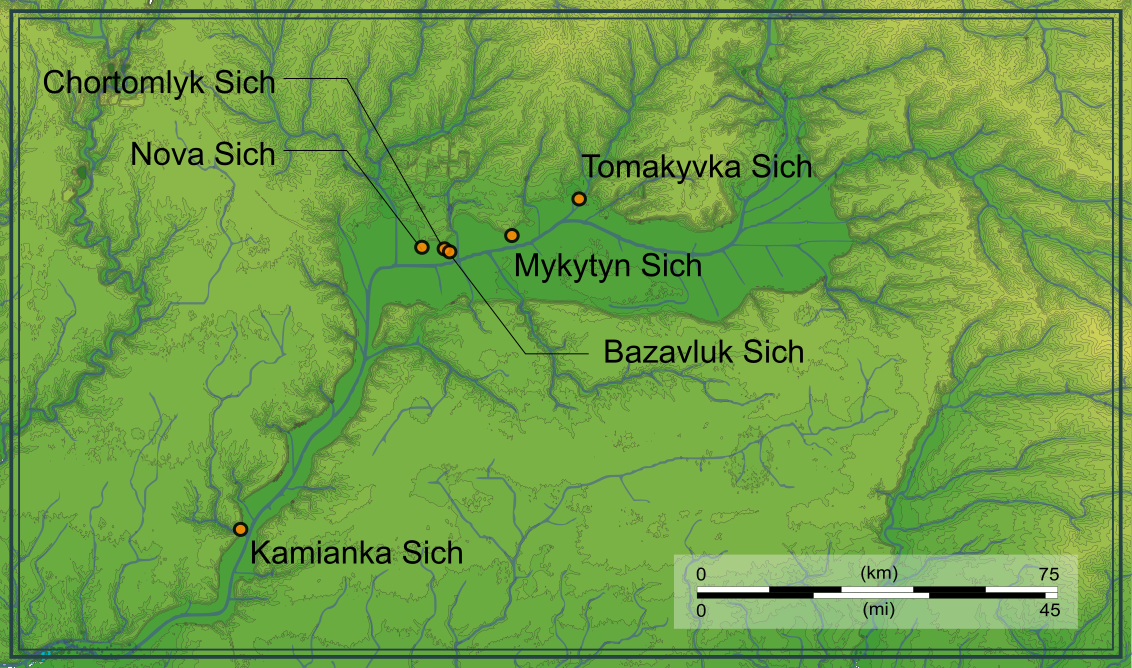
Siches of the Great Meadow.

Zaporizhian sichs:

- Khortytsia Castle (c. 1550s); its status as "the first sich" is disputed
- Tomakivka Sich (1540?–1593); its status as "the first sich" is disputed
- Bazavluk Sich (1593–1638)
- Mykytyn Sich (1639–1652)
- Chortomlyk Sich (1652–1709; 1728–1730)
- Kamianka Sich (1709–1711; 1728–1734)
- Oleshky Sich (1711–1728)
- Nova Sich (1734–1775)

Danubian sichs:

- Katerlez Sich
- Seimen Sich
- Dunavets Sich (1814–1828)

Other sichs:

- Ukrainian Far Eastern Sich (1937–1941)

== In culture ==
In the Dune series of novels by Frank Herbert, a sietch is a fortified cave settlement made by the Fremen people on the planet Arrakis; the name derives from sich. "Sietch Tabr" combines the Cossack words sich and tabor or "wagon fort".

== Bibliography ==
- Kuzyk, Tetyana Leonidivna (2013). "Січ, як термін" [Sich, as a term]. Encyclopedia of History of Ukraine (in Ukrainian). Vol. 9. Kyiv: Institute of History of Ukraine. Archived from the original on 21 June 2026. (last updated 2021)
- Plokhy, Serhii (2022). The Gates of Europe: A History of Ukraine. New York, NY: Basic Books. p. 414. ISBN 978-0-465-07394-8.
