= Kish otaman =

Title of the leader of the Zaporozhian Host

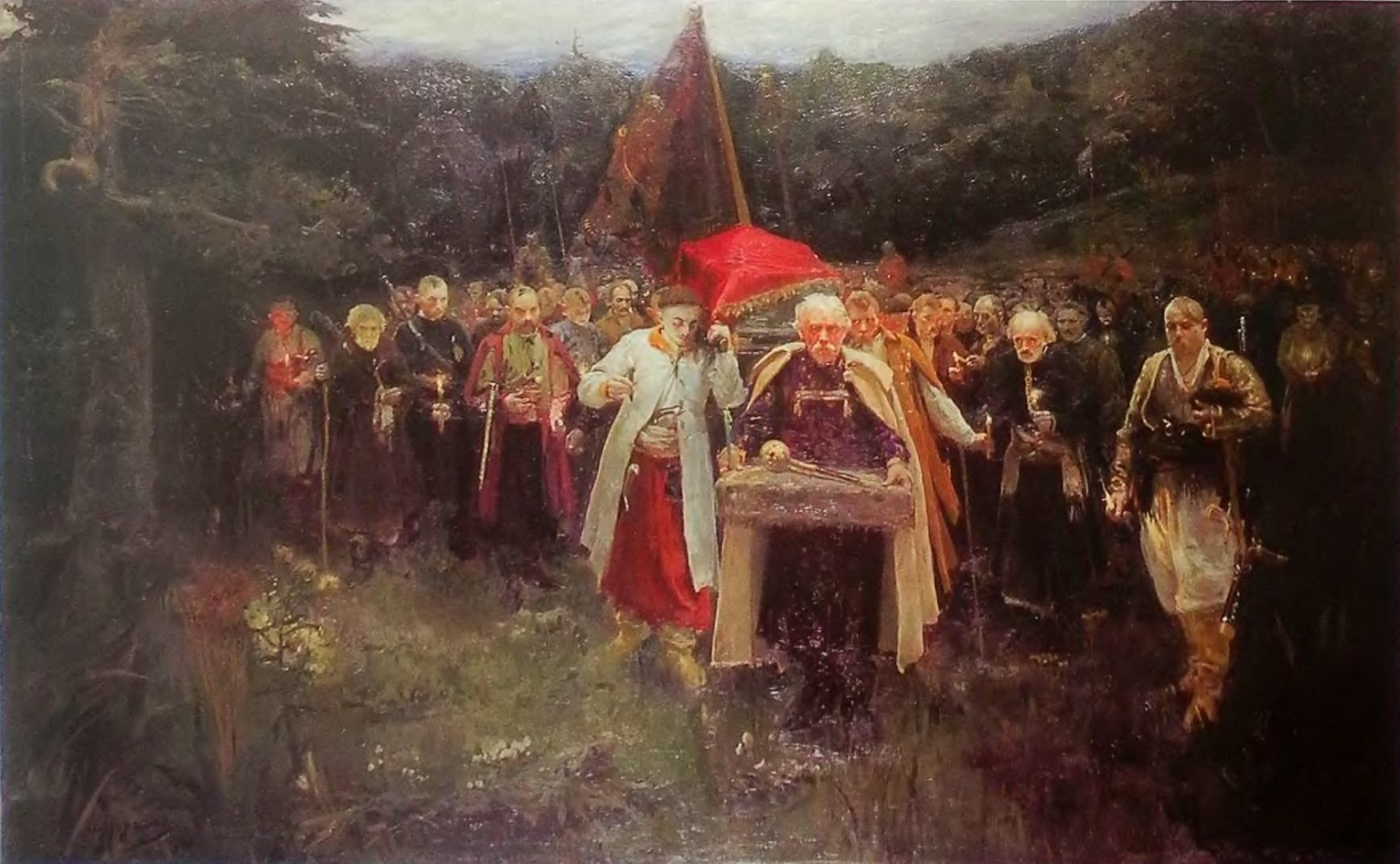
Burial ceremony of a Kish otaman by Oleksandr Murashko (1900)

A Kish otaman (Ukrainian: Кошовий отаман, romanized: Koshovyi otaman), also known as Koshovyi of Zaporozhian Host (Ukrainian: Кошовий Війська Запорозького) was the chief officer (otaman) of the Kish of the Zaporozhian Sich in the 16th through 18th centuries, elected for a one-year term by the Sich Rada.

== Overview ==
The otaman was elected by the Sich Rada, consisting of the local Cossack starshyna. The Kish otaman and starshyna together wielded the highest military, administrative and judicial powers in a Sich. In peacetime, the otaman's decisions could be appealed by the Sich Rada, but in wartime, his decision was final.

The term "Kish otaman" is first attested in written sources in the 1620s, where he functioned as a governor of the hetman in the Zaporizhian Sich. Until the end of the 17th century, the title "Kish otaman" was interchangeably used with Hetman. After the 1637–38 Cossack uprisings were suppressed, the Ordinance of the Zaporozhian Host (1638) abolished the position of hetman and replaced it by a Commonwealth government commissioner. However, the Khmelnytsky Uprising of 1648 re-established a Ukrainian hetmanship, which stood above the Kish otamanship. The term "Kish hetman" was once applied to the rebel Yakiv Barabash in 1658 in opposition to Hetman Ivan Vyhovsky, but that phrase did not stick. By the end of the 17th century, there was a clear distinction between "Hetman" and "Kish otaman".

A Kish otaman was elected for a term of one year and in exceptional cases was reelected. Upon expiration of his term amounted to report on his activities to a military council. The Kish otaman that was not re-elected, returned to his assigned kurin.

== Duties ==
- Opening military councils (circle)
- Presiding over sessions of the Sich Rada
- Conducted external diplomatic relations
- Distributing military trophies
- Distributing profit from customs
- Legitimising the division of pastures, estates, and land for hunting and fishing
- Confirming the Kish starshyna elected by the Sich council
- Appointing palanka and other starshynas and sometimes military servicemen
- Acting as supreme judge asserted the sentences made by a Kish judge
- Accepting clergymen from Kyiv and appointing priests to the churches of the Sich and palankas
- Appointed a nakaznyi otaman (appointed otaman) as his deputy for periods of absence.

In 1723, this rank was depreciated with the nomination of an nakaznyi otaman (Ukrainian: Наказний отаман, 'appointed' or 'acting otaman') by the Tsar of Russia. Among most famous Kish otamans were Ivan Pidkova, Ivan Sirko, Petro Kalnyshevsky. There were at least 30 Kish otamans in the history of Zaporizhian Sich before its collapse in 1775. Nothing is known about the Kish otamans of Tomak Sich, Bezlavuk Sich, and Mykytyn Rih Sich. The longest standing Sich was the Chortomlyk Sich of which most of information has survived. After the defeat at the Battle of Poltava and the Sich raid Kost Hordiienko transferred the Sich downstream along the Dnieper to the old settlement of Oleshky in 1709, which was part of the Crimean Khanate (a vassal of the Ottoman Empire). It took some 25 years before the Russian government allowed the Cossacks to return to re-establish the New Sich by Ivan Malashevych. With the destruction of Sich in 1775 Zaporizhian Cossacks have moved to Danube Delta.

== List of Kish otamans ==
List of Kish otamans

The term "Kish otaman" is first attested in written sources in the 1620s.

- Bazavluk Sich (1593–1638)
  - Hryhoriy Chorny (1624–1625)
  - Ivan Sulyma, both mentioned as an elected Kish otaman in the Zaporizhian Sich (no date), and a Hetman of the unregistered Cossacks in 1628. Died 1635.
  - Taras Triasylo (1629–1631, 1634–1635, proclaimed Hetman)
  - Pavlo But (1636–1637)
- Mykytyn Sich (1638–1652)
  - Dmytro Hunia (1638, 1640)
- Chortomlyk Sich (1652–1709; 1728–1730)
  - Fedir Lutay (1652)
  - Yakiv Barabash (1656–1658), rebel "Kish hetman" in 1658
  - Pavlo Shkurko (Павло Шкурко, 1658)
  - Ivan Sirko (1659–1660, 1664–1665, 1673–1680)
  - Ivan Briukhovetsky (1662)
- Kamianka Sich (1709–1734) and Oleshky Sich (1711–1728)
  - Kost Hordiyenko (1702, 1703–1706, 1708–1709, 1711–1714, 1720–1728)
- Nova Sich (1734–1775)
  - Ivan Malashevych (1734, 1734–1736, 1742)
  - Hryhorii Lantukh (1756, According to the 1756 Zaporozhian Host Register.
  - Petro Kalnyshevsky (1762, 1765–1775)

== Bibliography ==
- Mytsyk, Yuri Andriyovych (2004). "Гетьман" [Hetman]. Encyclopedia of History of Ukraine (in Ukrainian). Vol. 2. Kyiv: Institute of History of Ukraine. p. 99. Archived from the original on 24 June 2026.
- Oliynyk, Oleksandr Leontiyovych (2008). "Кошовий отаман" [Kish otaman]. Encyclopedia of History of Ukraine (in Ukrainian). Vol. 5. Kyiv: Institute of History of Ukraine. pp. 263–265. Archived from the original on 23 September 2026.
