= Yuriy Kondufor =

Ukrainian academic and historian (1922-1997)

Yuriy Yuriyovych Kondufor (Ukrainian: Юрій Юрійович Кондуфор; 30 January 1922, Zubany, Khorolsky Povit – 10 January 1997, Kyiv) was a Soviet and Ukrainian academician, historian, director of the NASU Institute of History of Ukraine in 1978–1993. He was a veteran of World War II (Soviet–Japanese War).

Kondufor was a chief editor of Ukrainian Historical Journal in 1979–1988.

Honored Worker of Science of the Ukrainian SSR (since 1991). Laureate of the State Prize of the Ukrainian SSR in Science and Technology (1980; for his significant personal contribution to the creation of the multi-volume History of the Ukrainian SSR).
