= Yakiv Barabash =

Zaporozhian Cossack Otaman

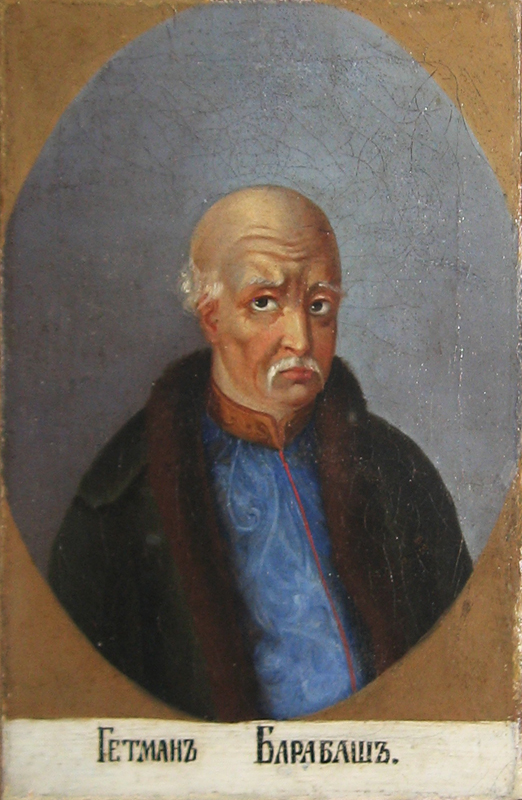
Yakiv Barabash

Yakiv Fedorovych Barabash (Ukrainian: Яків Федорович Барабаш) died in September 1658) was a Zaporozhian Cossack Otaman (1657–58) who opposed Hetman Ivan Vyhovsky.

In 1657 he and Poltava polkovnyk Martyn Pushkar led a pro-Muscovy revolt against Vyhovsky, who was generally pro-Polish in his policies. The revolt ended in June 1658 near Poltava, when Vyhovsky and his Cossacks defeated the rebellion. Barabash was later captured and executed.
