= Kapulivka =

Coordinates: 47°33′05″N 34°13′45″E

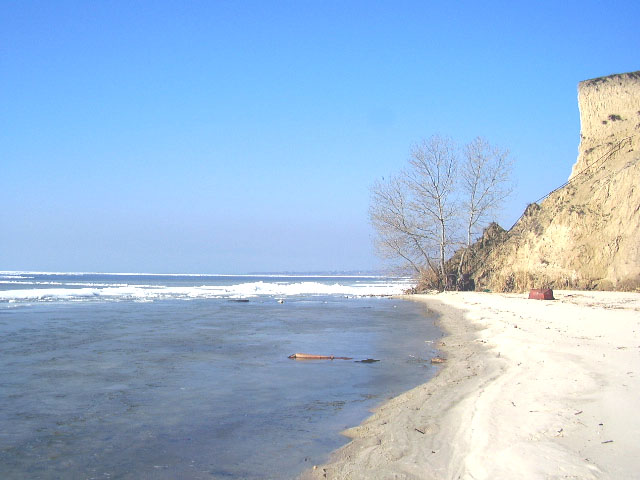
The Dnieper riverside in Kapulivka

Kapulivka is a village of historical significance in Nikopol Raion of Dnipropetrovsk Oblast in Ukraine. It belong rural hromadska, one of the hromadas of Ukraine. The population is 2,053.

== Geography ==
Kapulivka is situated on the right bank of the Kakhovka Reservoir. The distance to the raion jy center is about 20 km and passes by the N23 highway.

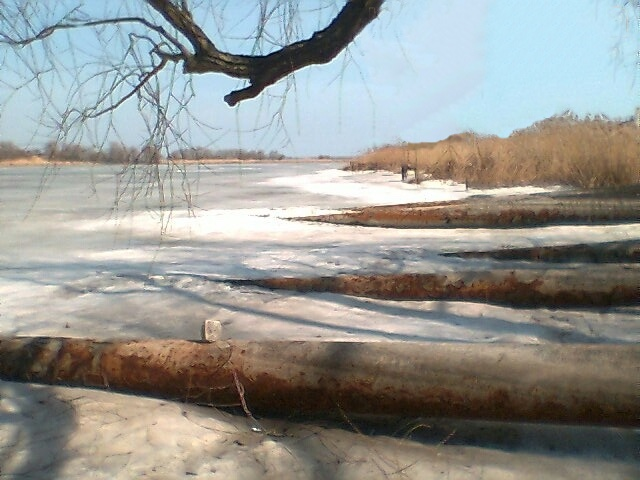
Kapulivka

== History ==
Kapulivka is a place where the Chortomlyk Sich was established in 1652 by kish otaman Fedir Lutay.

A legendary kish otaman of the Zaporozhian Host Ivan Sirko was buried in Kapulivka in 1680.
