= Chortomlyk Sich =

1652–1709 Cossack polity at the Dnieper River

Coordinates: 47.52807°N 34.21803°E

Chortomlyk Sich Чортомлицька Січ (Ukrainian)
- 1652–1709
- Korogva Coat of arms

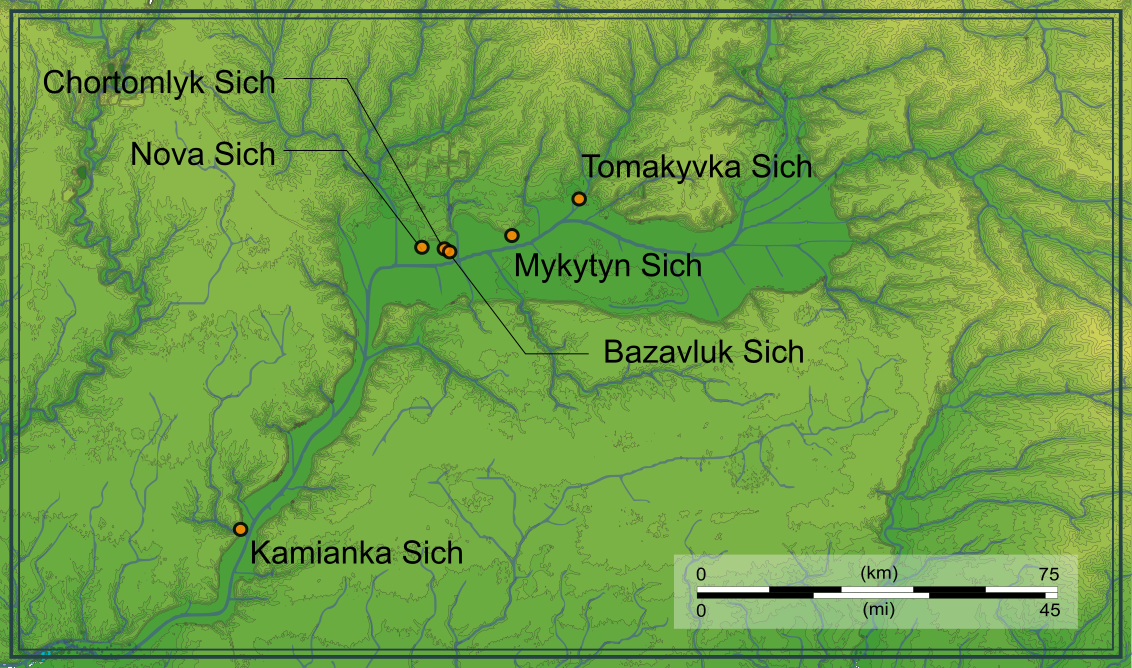
- Siches of the Great Meadow.
- Status: Cossack host
- Capital: Chortomlyk island
- Common languages: Ruthenian, Ukrainian
- Religion: Eastern Orthodoxy
- Government: Republic
- Kish otaman, i.a.
  - 1652–?: Fedir Lutay
  - 1654-57, 1658-59: Pavlo Homin
  - 1660–1680 (over 15 terms): Ivan Sirko
  - 1702, 1703-06, 1708-09: Kost Hordiienko
- Historical era: Early modern period
  - Establishment under Hetmanate: 1652
  - Disbandment by Tsardom of Russia: 1709
- Currency: All European currencies
Preceded by	Succeeded by
Mykytyn Sich	Kamianka Sich
- Today part of: Great Meadow, Ukraine

The Chortomlyk Sich (Note: Ukrainian: Чортомлицька Січ, romanized: Chortomlytska Sich.) (also Old Sich (Note: Ukrainian: Стара Січ, romanized: Stara Sich.)) was a sich founded by Cossacks led by kish otaman Fedir Lutay in the summer of 1652 on the right bank of the Chortomlyk distributary of the Dnieper near the current village of Kapulivka. It was the successor of the Mykytyn Sich (1639–1652).

The Sich lasted until 25 May 1709, when it was destroyed by Moscow's punitive expedition undertaken in response to the support of Hetman Ivan Mazepa by Zaporozhian Cossacks.

== History ==
=== 17th century ===
During the Khmelnytsky Uprising, Chortomlyk Sich guarded the then southern borders of Ukraine. Cossacks of the Sich took part in Bohdan Khmelnytskyi's campaigns, excelling in the battles of Zhvanets (1653), Horodok (1655), during the second siege of Lviv (1655), etc.

The national recognition of the Chortomlyk Sich spread during the time of kish otaman Ivan Sirko (1659—1680), who lived exclusively in the sich for 17 years and was elected a kish otaman more than 15 times, favoring his military merits. In particular, he became famous for the defeat of the 60,000-strong Ottoman-Tatar army, which suddenly attacked Chortomlyk Sich on New Year's Eve in 1675; as well as the Crimean campaign of 1676, when the Cossacks led by Sirko for the first time crossed the Syvash bay and threatened the Khan's capital Bakhchysarai.

=== Sack of 1709 ===
After the defeat of Ivan Mazepa and his supporters at the Battle of Poltava in 1709, the Chortomlyk Sich was sacked by the Moscovite armed forces, together with the capital of Cossack Hetmanate, Baturyn and other Ukrainian cities.

=== Abandonment and brief resettlement in 1728–1730 ===
Most Cossacks resettled from the Chortomlyk Sich to the Kamianka Sich in 1709. Two years later in May 1711, during the Prut Campaign, the Kamianka Sich was sacked by Muscovite troops as well. The majority of Cossacks then resettled to the Oleshky Sich, near the mouth of the river Dnipro in the Black Sea, putting themselves under the protection of the Crimean Khanate.

The Chortomlyk Sich was briefly resettled from May 1728 until spring 1730. The Oleshky Sich was forcibly abandoned and scorched in May 1728, and its residents moved to the Chortomlyk Sich, where they waited in vain for two years for the tsar of Moscow to accept them as subjects of the Russian Empire. Not receiving a positive response, in the spring of 1730, the Zaporizhian Cossacks resettled from the Chortomlyk Sich back to the Kamianka Sich on the Kamianka River, and once more subjected themselves to the protection of the Crimean Khan.

== Literature ==
- Shcherbak, Vitaliy Oleksiyovych (2013). "Чортомлицька Січ" [Chortomlytska Sich]. Encyclopedia of History of Ukraine (in Ukrainian). Vol. 10. Kyiv: Institute of History of Ukraine. p. 574. Archived from the original on 24 June 2026.
- Hurzhiy, Oleksandr Ivanovych (2010). "Олешківська Січ" [Oleshkivska Sich]. Encyclopedia of History of Ukraine (in Ukrainian). Vol. 7. Kyiv: Institute of History of Ukraine. p. 584. Archived from the original on 23 June 2026.
- Yavornytsky, Dmytro Ivanovych (1993) [1897]. Історія запорозьких козаків. Том 3 (1686–1734) [History of the Zaporizhian Cossacks. Volume 3 (1686–1734)] (PDF) (in Ukrainian). Kyiv: Naukova Dumka. p. 588. ISBN 5-12-002052-6. (history until 1734)
