= Pokrovske rural hromada =

Municipality in Dnipropetrovsk Oblast, Ukraine

Pokrovske rural hromada Покровська сільська громада
- Hromada
- Interactive map of Pokrovske rural hromada
- Country: Ukraine
- Oblast: Dnipropetrovsk Oblast
- Raion: Nikopol Raion
- Admin. center: Pokrovske

Area
  - Total: 528.7 km^{2} (204.1 sq mi)

Population (2020)
  - Total: 10,484
  - Density: 19.83/km^{2} (51.36/sq mi)

Pokrovske rural hromada is a territorial community in Ukraine, in the Nikopol Raion of the Dnipropetrovsk Oblast, with an administrative centre in the village of Pokrovske.

== General information ==
The area of the territory is 528.7 km^{2} (204.1 sq mi), with a population of 10,484 people in 2020.

== Populated places ==
The hromada includes the villages of Kapulivka and Putylivka.
