= Putylivka, Dnipropetrovsk Oblast =

Village in Ukraine

Coordinates: 47.8083°N 34.2095°E

Putylivka is a village located in Pokrovske rural hromada, Dnipropetrovsk Oblast between the cities of Kryvyi Rih and Dnipro in Ukraine. The population is 301.

== History ==
The village is a former Jewish agricultural colony and a member of the former Jewish district of Satlindorf created in the 1920s, consisting of dozens of Jewish agricultural colonies.

During World War II, the village was occupied by Germans from 1941 to 1943. In October 1941, approximately 100 Jews were shot in a pit by a German Einsatzgruppen. There is a memorial at the execution site.
