= Kamianka Sich =

Coordinates: 47°0′2″N 33°39′12″E

Kamianka Sich Кам'янська Січ (Ukrainian)
- 1709–1734
- Flag Coat of arms

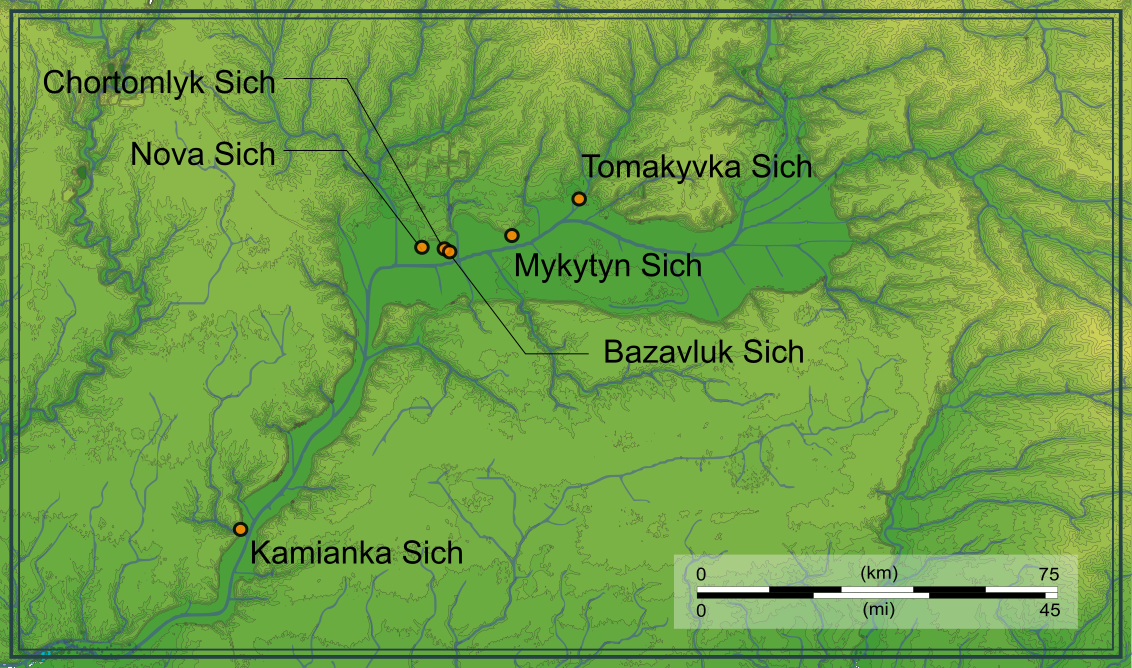
- Siches of the Great Meadow.
- Status: Cossack host
- Common languages: Middle Ukrainian
- Religion: Eastern Orthodoxy
- Government: Republic
- Cossack otaman
- History
  - establishment: 1709
  - transfer: 1734
- Currency: All European currencies
Preceded by	Succeeded by
Chortomlyk Sich	Oleshky Sich

Immovable Monument of National Significance of Ukraine
- Official name: Кам'янська Січ, кладовище запорізьких козаків і могила кошового отамана Костя Гордієнка (Kamianka Sich, Zaporozhian Cossack cemetery and grave of kish otaman Kost Hordiienko)
- Type: History
- Reference no.: 210008-Н

The Kamianka Sich or Kamianska Sich (Ukrainian: Кам'янська Січ, romanized: Kamjans'ka Sich) was an administrative and military centre of the Zaporozhian Cossacks during its time under the protection of the Crimean Khanate in the first third of the 18th century. The name of the Sich, which is used in historical and local history literature, is explained by the fact that it was located at the mouth of the right tributary of the river Dnipro: the Kamianka, near the village of Respublikanets in Kherson Oblast.

Since 11 April 2019, the Kamianka Sich National Nature Park has been a National Nature Park of Ukraine.

== Location of the Sich ==
The Kamianka Sich was located at the confluence of the Dnipro and the small steppe river Kamianka on the right bank. The Sich occupied a cape convenient for defence, formed by the left, northern bank of the Kamianka River and the Kozatske Richyshche, a branch of the Dnipro. Thus, the administrative centre of the Zaporozhian Host was located on the very border with the direct possessions of the Crimean Khanate. Alongside the Sich, there was the Kairy (Kamianka) ferry across the Dnipro. As is well known, river crossings have always been of great strategic importance. The Kairy ferry was convenient only from the right bank to the left – downstream of the river channels, but not vice versa. Therefore, convoys on their way to Crimea used the Kairy ferry, and on their way back the Kyzykermen ferry.

After the construction of the Kakhovka Hydroelectric Power Plant in the 1950s, the floodplains of the Dnipro were flooded by the Kakhovka Reservoir, and the lower reaches of the Kamianka River were transformed into the long, winding Respublikanets Estuary. Nowadays, the archaeological remains of the Kamianka Sich are located in the village of Respublikanets, Mylove rural hromada, Beryslav Raion, Kherson Oblast. Part of the territory of the monument is occupied by illegally built village houses and garden plots. The monument occupies part of the eastern slope of Cape Strilka, formed by the right bank of the Kakhovka Reservoir and the left bank of the Respublikanets Bay. The surface of the cape is covered with grass, bushes and small trees along the shores. The eastern side of the cape has been transformed into a cliff by coastal erosion, as a result of which more than half of the monument's area has already been destroyed.

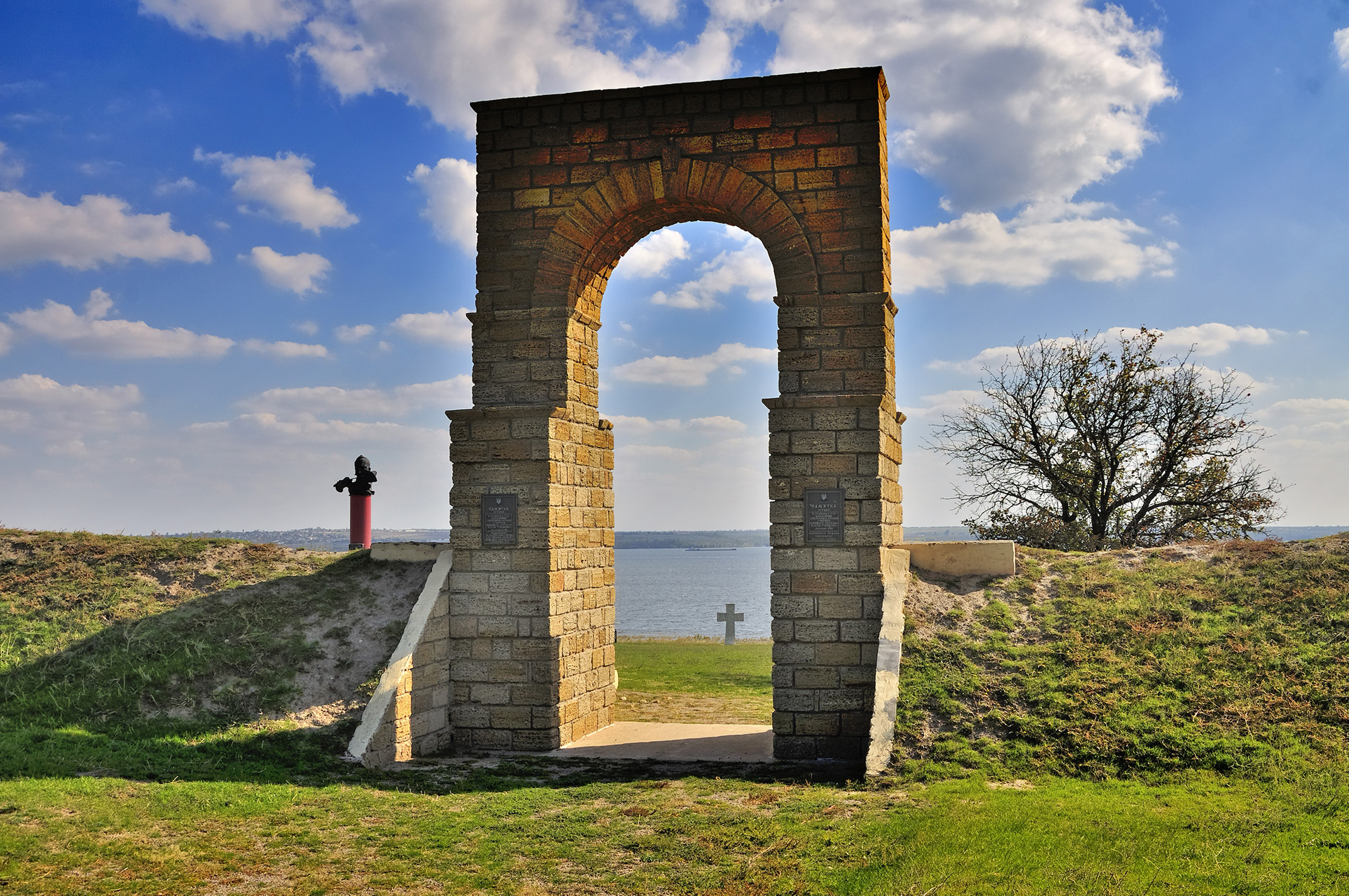
Site of the Kamianka Sich in Kherson Oblast, pictured in 2014.

The only visible trace of the Sich remaining on the surface of the earth is the grave cross of Kish otaman Kost Hordiienko. The inscription on the cross today (2015) is practically illegible, but its content is known from early publications: "In the name of the Father, the Son, and the Holy Spirit. Here lies the servant of God, Konstantin Hordievych, ataman of the glorious Zaporozhian Cossack Host and commander of the Plytnievsky kuren: he passed away on 4 May 1733." The damaged grave cross of Vasyl Yerofeyevich, the kish otaman, also comes from the Kamianka Sich. Today, it is kept in the Khortytsia National Reserve in Zaporizhzhia. The inscription on it reads: "In the name of the Holy, Life-Giving and Indivisible Trinity, Amen. Here lies the servant of God Vasyl Yerofeyevich, otaman of the glorious Zaporozhian Cossack Host and the Tytarivsky kuren. He passed away in the year 1731, in the month of May, on the 23rd day."

== Planning of the Sich ==
The Sich occupied a small corner between the right bank of the Cossack River and the left bank of the river Kamianka, and had the shape of an irregular triangle. In the middle of the Sich, from north to south, there was a square, on both sides of which researcher Dmytro Yavornytsky counted 40 depressions from ancient buildings at the end of the 19th century. One row of these "huts," according to Dmytro Yavornytsky, stretched along the Kozatske Richyshche with exits to the west, and three rows ran from the steppe to the Kamianka with exits to the east and west. Between the last three rows, as between the first, an area of the same size as the first stretched from north to south. Each of the kurens was about 14.9 m long and 8.5 m wide. No traces of the church were found. According to Dmytro Yavornytsky, the Sich was surrounded by a stone wall, of which only a few wild stones remained at the end of the 19th century. South of the Sich, on Cape Strilka, there was a suburban area. North of the Sich was a cemetery, the exact location and boundaries of which are unknown today.

== Dating ==
There are discrepancies in various sources regarding the dating of the Kamianka Sich. According to the so-called Memoir for Posterity (1734), after the destruction of the Chortomlyk Sich in 1709, the Cossacks founded a new Sich in Oleshky, lived there for nineteen years, returned to the island of Chortomlyk in 1728, where they stayed for two years, and in 1730 moved to the river Kamianka.

Prince Semen Ivanovych Myshetsky, author of The History of the Zaporizhian Cossacks written in the 1740s, claimed that after the destruction of the Old Sich on Chortomlyk Island in 1709 by order of Peter I, the Cossacks founded a Sich on the river Kamianka. Soon, this Sich was also destroyed by the Muscovites. After that, the Zaporozhians moved to the Oleshky Sich in the Oleshky tract "on the Crimean side of the Dnipro." Later, the Sich on Kamianka was plundered by Cossacks from the Samara River, who were dissatisfied with their subordinate position to the Sich Cossacks. After that, the Sich was moved back to Kamianka, where it remained until the Zaporozhian Cossacks returned to Moscow's protection in 1734. Alexander Rigelman, in his work Chronicle Narrative about Little Russia and its People and the Cossacks in General (1787), generally repeats the testimony of Myshetsky, reporting that the Sich was moved from Oleshky to Kamianka in 1733.

Apollon Skalkowski, in his 1841 work «История Новой Сечи или последнего Коша Запорожского» [The History of the Nova Sich, or the last Zaporozhian Sich], reporting on the destruction of the Sich at the Kamianka in 1711 and its relocation to Oleshky, makes no mention of the "second period" of the existence of the "Kamianka" Sich. According to him, the Sich was moved from Oleshky directly to the Pidpilna River. In the first edition of his work History of the Zaporozhian Cossacks (1892), Dmytro Yavornytsky does not dare to unequivocally accept the point of view of either Myshetsky or the anonymous author of the aforementioned Memoir for Posterity. In the second edition of his work (1900), the historian unequivocally accepts the author's point of view of Memoir for Posterity. The aforementioned Memoirs is an official document drawn up on 29 May 1734 (less than two months after the Sich was moved from Kamianka to Pidpilna) by direct witnesses to the events on the orders of the Sich otaman Ivan Malashevych and approved by the military kish seal. Therefore, there is no reason to doubt the testimony of the Memoirs regarding the chronology of the Sich during the period when the Zaporozhian Host were under Crimean protection. Despite this, the thesis about two periods of existence of the Kamianka Sich (1709–1711 and 1728–1734) is still repeated not only in numerous popular publications, but also in academic encyclopaedic editions.

== Transition of the Zaporozhian Cossacks under Crimean protection ==
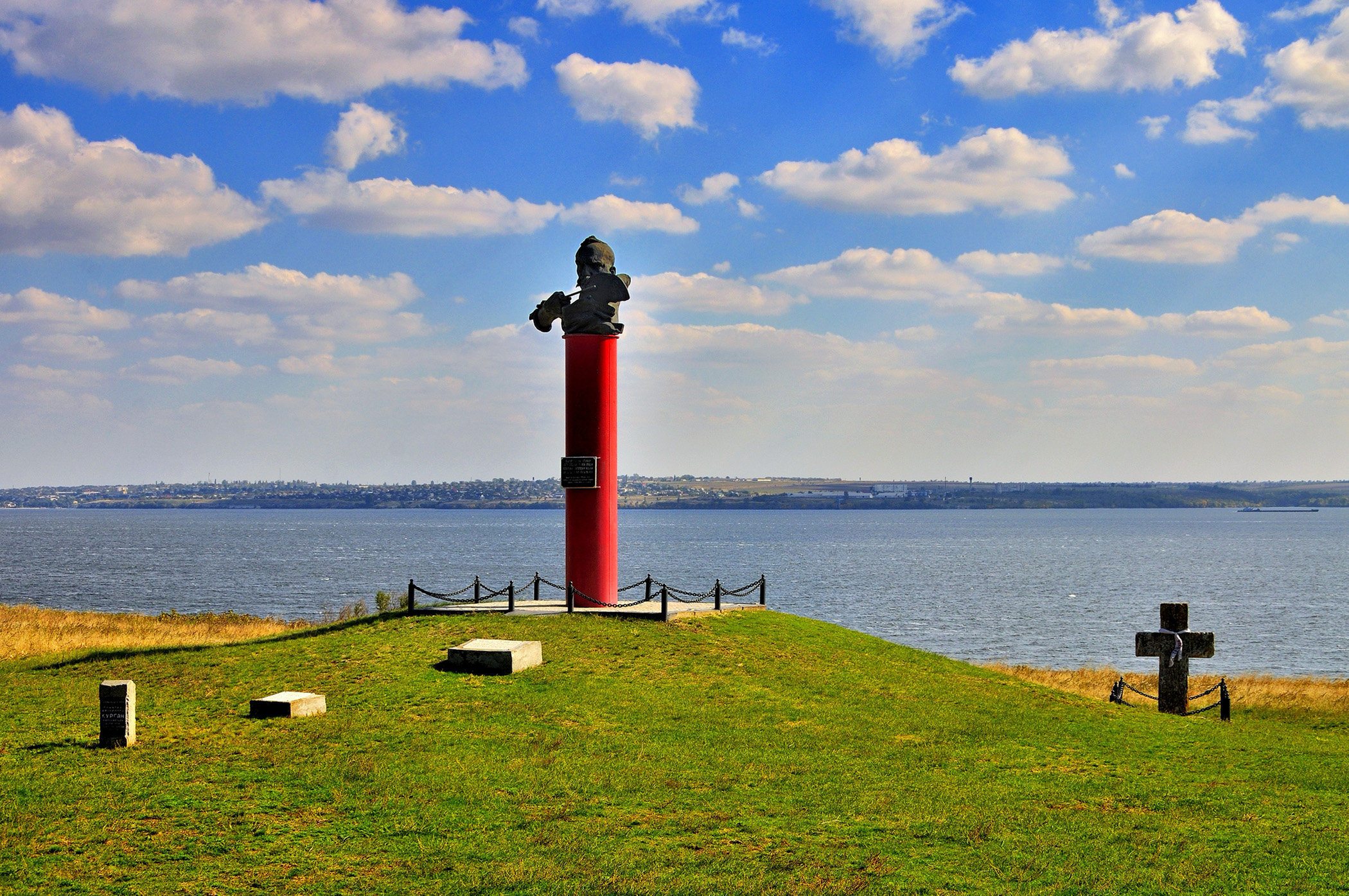
Monument in honour of the Cossack otaman of the Kamianska Sich, Kost Hordiienko, near his grave (2014)

The existence of the Kamianka Sich coincided with a dramatic period in the history of Zaporozhia. In retaliation for siding with Hetman Ivan Mazepa and Swedish King Charles XII, on 14 May 1709, on the orders of the Muscovite Tsar Peter I, the Chortomlyk Sich was destroyed. The Cossacks who survived the destruction of the Sich and the subsequent defeat at the Battle of Poltava fled to the territory of the Crimean Khanate. Based on an analysis of archival documents, Zaporozhia researcher Volodymyr Ivanovych Milchev asserts that it was then that the Cossack settlement in Oleshky arose, which became the next Sich.

In May 1711, during the Russo-Turkish War (1710–1713), a combined detachment of Muscovite troops and hetman regiments under the command of A. Ushakov, which was stationed on the left bank of the Dnipro in the fortress of Kamiany Zaton, set out on a campaign to destroy the Oleshky Sich. However, constant attacks by the Crimean Tatars and Zaporozhian Cossacks prevented this plan from being carried out. In order to somehow redeem themselves in the eyes of the high command, part of the Muscovite army descended the Dnipro and burnt down a small Cossack settlement at the mouth of the Kamianka River, which was presented as the destruction of the "new" Sich itself. As a result of the Treaty of the Pruth signed on 23 July 1711 (O.S. 12 July 1711) between the Ottoman Empire and Muscovy, Zaporozhia came under the protection of the Crimean Khanate. During this period, the Cossacks were allowed to use the profits from, in particular, the Kamianka (Kairy) ferry crossing. This fact indirectly indicates the existence of a settlement in this place even before the Sich was moved to Kamianka.

== Sich on the river Kamianka ==
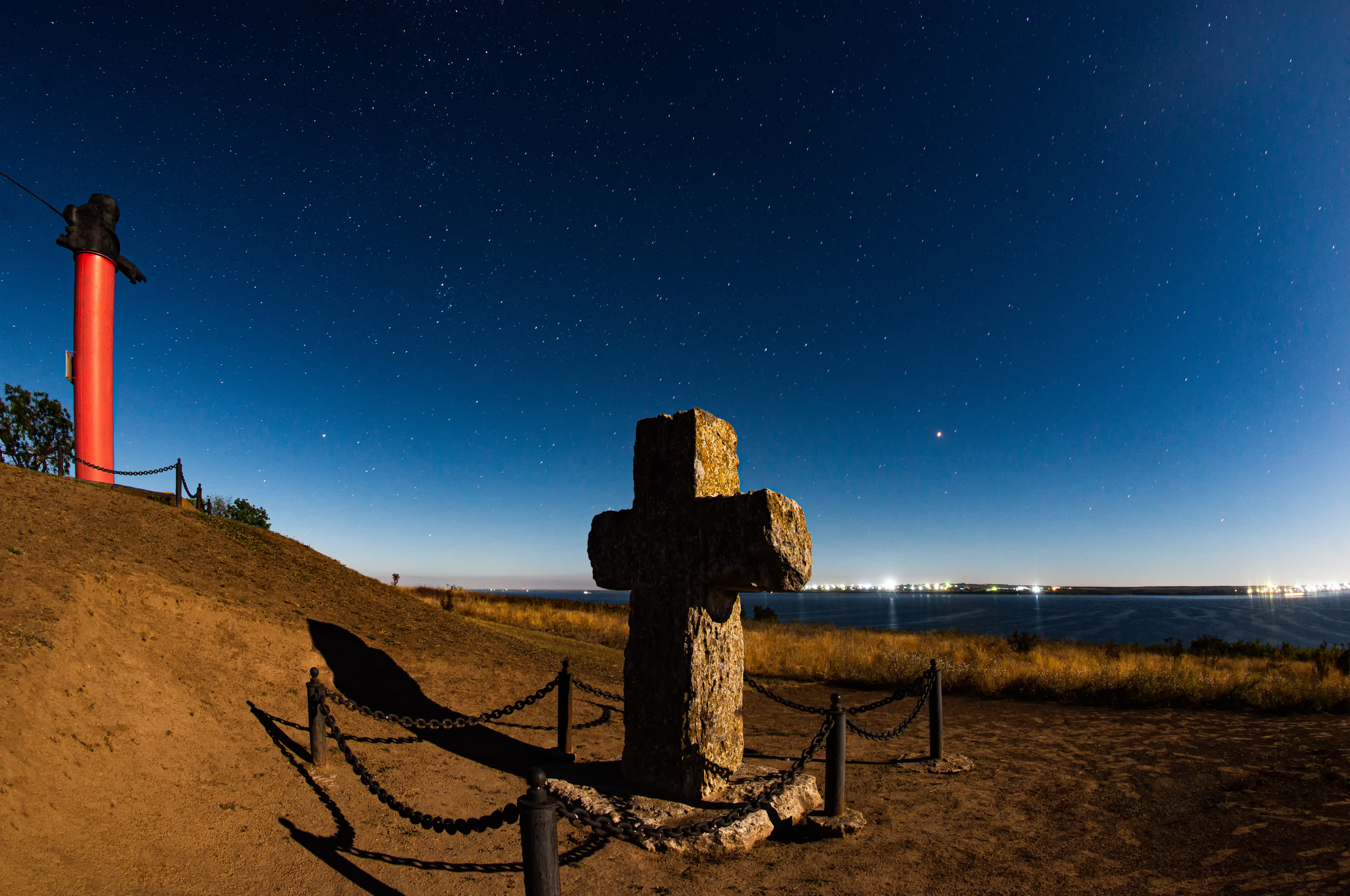
The Cross of Kost Hordiienko at the Kamianka Sich (2020)

On 23 May 1728, the Zaporizhian Cossacks held a council (rada) in the Oleshky Sich, where they elected Kost Hordiienko as their kish otaman. The next day, a large group of other Cossacks suddenly arrived in Oleshky on forty ships from the Old (Chortomlyk) Sich. After wreaking havoc, arresting Hordiienko and taking the treasures, they, together with the local Cossacks, set off for the island of Chortomlyk. The whole Oleshky Sich was evacuated by 27 May 1728, while all buildings were dismantled and burnt down. The Sich on Chortomlyk remained there for two years, while the Zaporozhian Cossacks waited in vain for permission to become subjects of the Russian Empire. Not receiving a positive response, in the spring of 1730, the Zaporizhian Cossacks moved the Sich back to the Kamianka River, and once more subjected themselves to the protection of the Crimean Khan. During this period, as before, the Cossacks were involved in Crimean campaigns in the North Caucasus, engaged in economic activities throughout the territory of the Crimean Khanate, as far as the Lower Don and the Kuban, and sometimes even settled in the Crimean Mountains. During their 25 years under the protection of the Crimean Khanate, the Zaporozhian Cossacks came to consider these lands their own. Therefore, after the end of the next Russo–Turkish War of 1735–1739, they claimed rights to the former Crimean lands between the Berda and Don rivers, which had been annexed to the Russian Empire. This led to a confrontation with the Don Cossacks. On many maps of that time, compiled by Russian engineers, the borders of the lands of the Zaporozhian Host reached the delta of the Don River. For example, the "General map from Kyiv along the river Dnipro to Ochakiv and across the steppe to Azov..." by Daniel de Bosquet (1751), or "Map of the Little Russian and Sloboda regiments, as well as the Novorossiysk Governorate with their adjacent lands" by Magnus von Renner (1764).

== Zaporozhian Cossacks' entry into Russian subjecthood ==
During the period of protection by the Crimean Khanate, two political parties competed for influence in Zaporozhia: the pro-Crimean and pro-Moscow parties. The first, which represented the interests of the broad masses of the Sich community, was headed by kish otaman Kost Hordiienko. Representatives of this party hated the Muscovite Tsardom for trampling on their ancestral freedoms and repressing the Cossacks in 1709 and later. In addition, the establishment of clear borders with the Crimean Khanate by Peter I deprived the Zaporozhian Cossacks of the opportunity to freely travel to the lower reaches of the river Dnipro for salt, fishing, and other trades. The pro-Moscow party was led by kish otaman Ivan Malashevych, Vasyl Huzh, and Ivan Husak. Its social base consisted of the population of winter settlements and settlements in the Dnipro Rapids region, along the Oril and Samara rivers. The economy of the "winter dwellers" was based on transhumant cattle breeding, agriculture, beekeeping and salt production. Wealthy representatives of the pro-Moscow party keenly felt the need to restore broken trade ties with the Cossack Hetmanate. In addition, throughout the entire period of the Zaporozhian Cossacks' stay under Crimean protection, tensions and mistrust between the Cossacks and the Crimean Tatars grew steadily.

After the death of the most influential representative of the pro-Crimean party, Kost Hordiienko, in 1733, supporters of becoming Russian subjects gained the upper hand. On 28 March 1734, the Zaporozhian Cossacks, unwilling to obey the orders of the Crimean Khan to move the Sich back to Oleshky, left Kamianka. At that time, there were 7,115 Cossacks in the Sich alone. On 31 March 1734, they founded the last Zaporozhian Sich on the Pidpilna River.

== Settlement on the Kamianka after Sich relocation ==
After the administrative centre of the Zaporozhian Cossacks was moved to the Pidpilna River in 1734, the settlement on the Kamianka River did not cease to exist. Documents from the mid- to late 18th century, there is mention of a Cossack settlement that did not have a clearly established name: 'by the Kamianka River,' 'in the Kamianka tract,' 'Kamianka,' 'Ust-Kamianka', 'Kamianka, where the Sich was.' On maps of that time, this location was marked as a small fortification called Davnia or Stara Sich ("Ancient" or "Old Sich").

After the destruction of the Zaporozhian Sich in 1775, a post station was probably located here.. In 1795, the landowner village of Konsulivka (Rozarevka) was first mentioned, which was named after the consul general of the Holy Roman Empire Ivan Hryhorovych Rozarevych. At the beginning of the 20th century, it belonged to F. S. Agarkov, on whose orders a large complex of buildings was erected in Konsulivka: a palace, a Lutheran church and several large farm buildings. Only ruins of these buildings have survived into the 21st century. After Soviet power was established in the region in 1920, the former farm was reorganised into the Republikanets artil (collective farm), which gave the village its modern name. As early as the beginning of the 1930s, thanks to the Kamianka Sich, the village was mentioned in tourist guides. In the second half of the 20th century, residents of the village of Republikanets illegally built several residential estates on the territory of the archaeological remains of the Kamianka Sich, and the surrounding area was used for private plots.

== Archaeological research on the Kamianka Sich ==
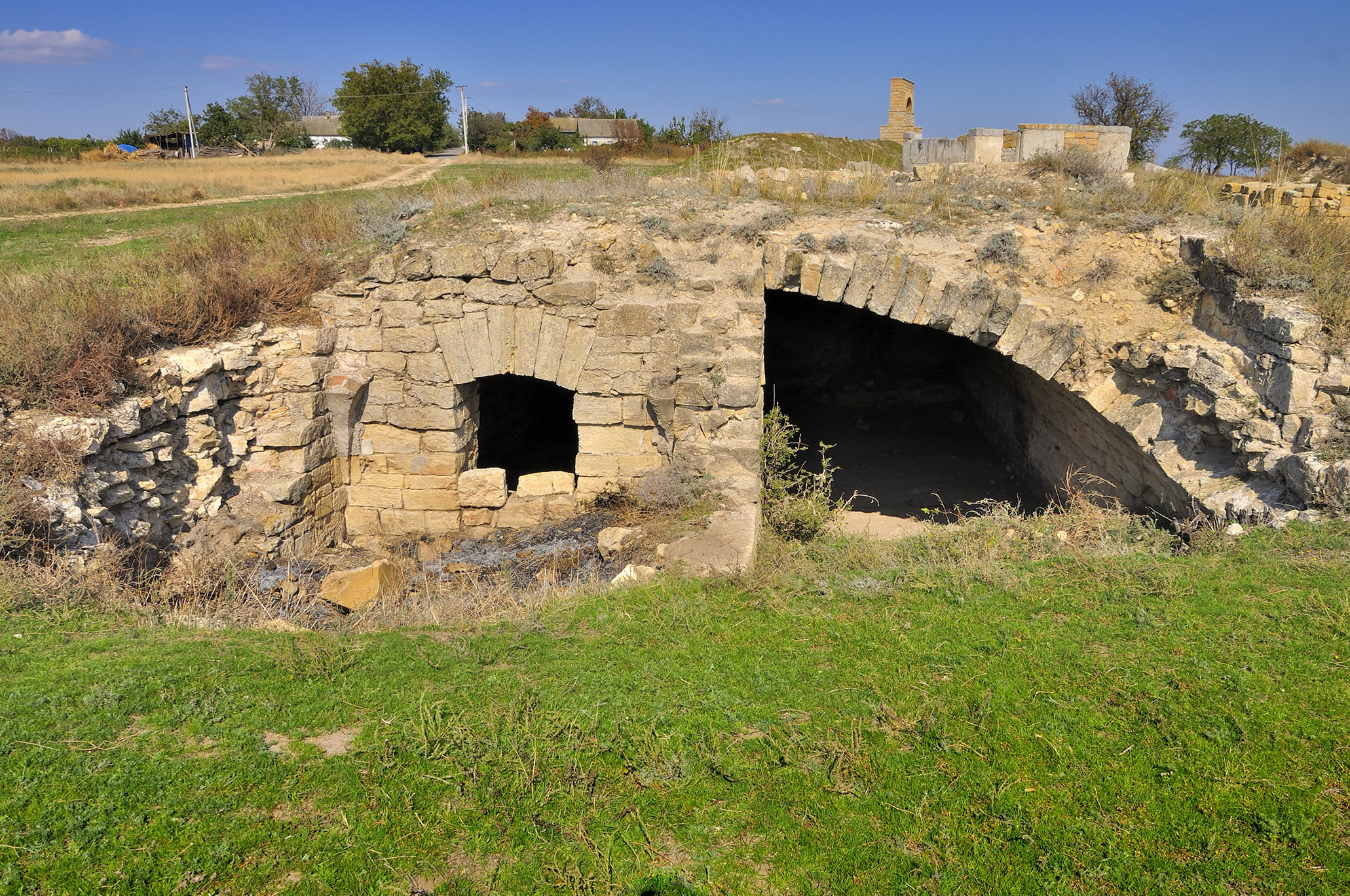
Cossack catacombs (dwellings and structures) on the territory of the former Kamianka Sich, pictured in 2014.

The first to draw attention to Kamianka Sich as a historical monument was Mykola Pavlovych Vertilyak, a full member of the Odesa Society of History and Antiquities and a local historian. In a publication that appeared in 1844, he noted the neglect and destruction of the remains of the Sich, reporting on the destruction in recent years of a large number of grave crosses in the Cossack cemetery and "ramparts with cladding of hewn stone". Writer and ethnographer Alexander Afanasyev-Chuzhbinsky, who visited Kamianka Sich in 1858, also noted the dismissive and indifferent attitude of the owners of the estate towards this remarkable monument.

The first scientific description and topographical survey of the Kamianka Sich was made by Dmytro Yavornytsky in the 1880s. The researcher determined the location of the Sich square, kurens, treasuries, their number and size, etc. The first archaeological research at this site was conducted by Viktor Hoshkevych in 1909 and 1913–14. The excavations were carried out with the assistance of the owner of the estate, F. S. Oharkov, who donated all the materials obtained during the research to the Kherson Museum.

In 1939 and 1953, archaeological excavations at the site were conducted by F. B. Kopylov and Olena Apanovych. As a result of the creation of the Kakhovka Reservoir and the erosion of its banks, by 1970 the condition of the Kamiaska Sich territory had significantly deteriorated: its entire southern and eastern parts had been destroyed. In 1972-73, an expedition of the Khortytsia State Historical and Cultural Reserve led by Oleksandr Bodiansky conducted research at the site. In 1974, extensive excavations were carried out by Arnold Sokulsky. This work was continued in 1989–91 by a joint expedition of the Institute of Archaeology of the National Academy of Sciences of Ukraine and the Khortytsia State Historical and Cultural Reserve under the leadership of A. O. Kozlovsky and V. E. Ilyinsky. Subsequently, in 2009, archaeological excavations were conducted under the direction of V. E. Ilyinsky. In 2011, D. D. Nikonenko conducted exploratory work to locate the remains of the Sich cemetery, but these searches were unsuccessful.

Throughout the research, a significant amount of unique information has been accumulated on the material culture of the Zaporozhian Cossacks in the early 18th century. For the first time, the remains of several semi-dugout Cossack huts have been archaeologically studied. In addition, the remains of an above-ground "officers", and in the economic suburbs of the Sich – a tavern, smithies, iron smelting furnaces, pits for burning lime and charcoal, etc. The huge collection of artefacts consists of ceramics (various types of tableware, stove tiles and pipes for smoking tobacco), glassware (bottles, tableware, window panes), iron (blacksmith tools, nails, staples, fishing hooks, etc.), weapons, jewellery, Crimean and Muscovite coins. A significant amount of osteological materials complement scholars' understanding of the economy of the inhabitants of the Kamianka Sich. Historical evidence of the Muscovite pogrom in 1711 has been found archaeological confirmation : a layer of fire has been traced, traces of destruction by artillery fire have been found, canister shot and broken human skulls have been found.

== Kamianka Sich branch of the Khortytsia National Reserve ==
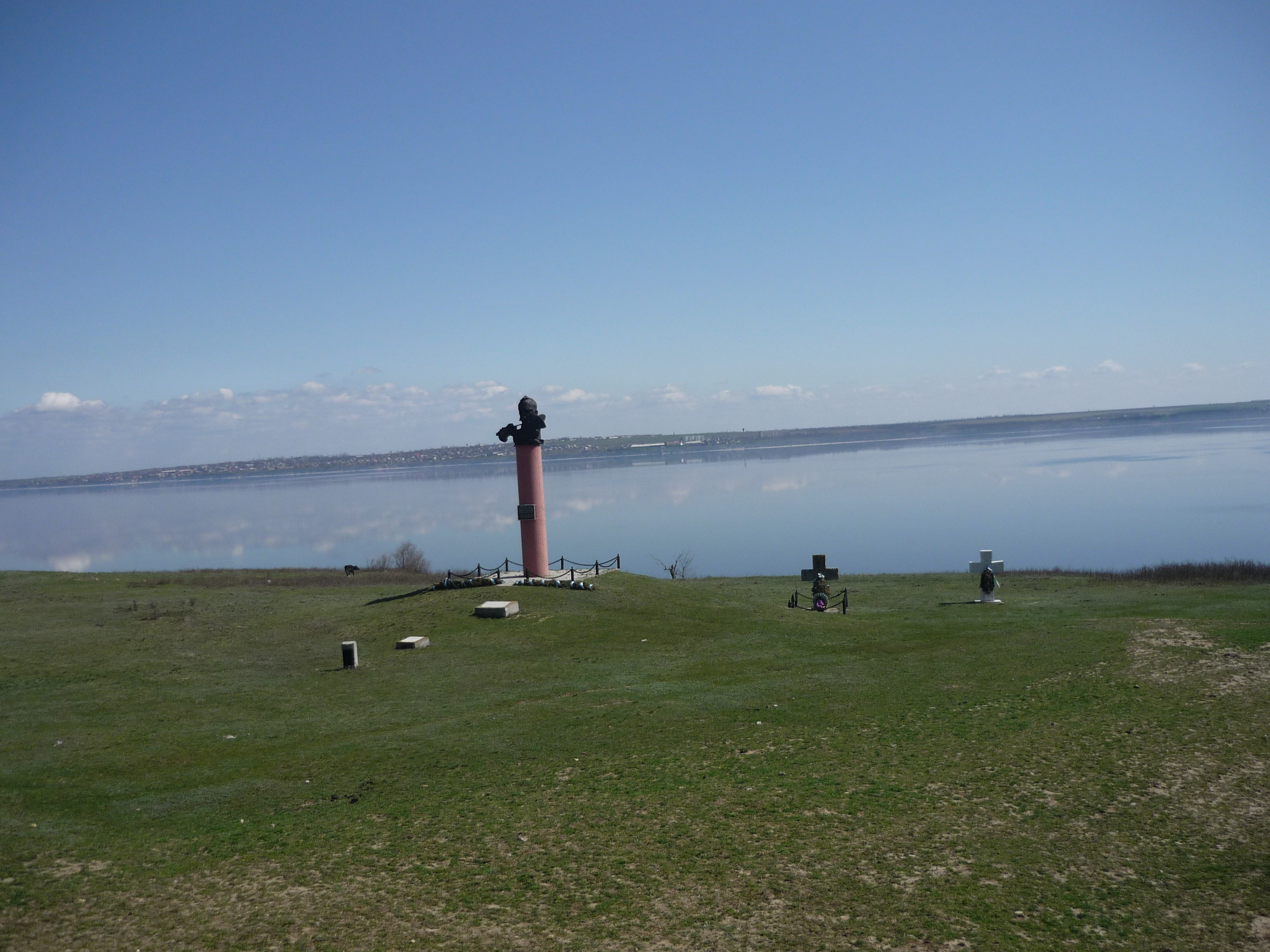
Panorama of the Kamianska Sich and monument to Kost Hordiienko (2010).

In September 1965, the government of the Ukrainian Soviet Socialist Republic adopted a resolution "On the preservation of memorable places associated with the history of the Cossacks."

Only in January 1983, "the Kamianka Sich and the cemetery of Zaporozhian Cossacks of the first half of the 18th century" was taken under protection as a monument of local significance. In the second half of the 1980s, with the beginning of Perestroika, interest in the history of the Cossacks grew significantly. The Kamianka Sich became a place of pilgrimage for Ukrainian patriots. In 1994, a monument to Kost Hordiienko was erected here. Modern Ukrainian Cossacks have introduced a tradition of holding a memorial service every year on 1 May in honour of the Cossack otaman buried here.

At the suggestion of archaeologist M. P. Olenkovsky, the Kherson Oblast authorities initiated the creation of the Kamianka Sich Historical and Cultural Reserve in December 2004. However, due to a lack of funding, the idea remained on paper. In October 2008, during the all-Ukrainian scientific and practical conference "History of the Cossacks in monuments and museum practice," a resolution was adopted to transfer the territory of the Kamianka Sich to the Khortytsia National Reserve. According to the Resolution of the Cabinet of Ministers of Ukraine dated 3 September 2009 No. 928 "On the inclusion of cultural heritage sites of national importance in the State Register of Immovable Monuments of Ukraine," "the Kamianka Sich, the cemetery of Zaporozhian Cossacks and the grave of kish otaman Kost Hordiienko" in the village of Respublikanets, Beryslav Raion, Kherson Oblast, was entered into the aforementioned register under No. 210008-N. On 30 September 2009, the Cabinet of Ministers of Ukraine decided to declare the Kamianka Sich a branch of the Khortytsia National Reserve. In the summer of 2009, as part of preparations for the celebration of the 300th anniversary of the Kamianka Sich, the territory of the monument was cleaned up: the cellars of the Aharkovs' house were cleared of rubbish, a chapel was laid, trees were planted, a symbolic brick gate and earthen ramparts were built, the approximate boundaries of the Sich were marked with earthen ramparts and a moat, and a billboard with its imagined graphic reconstruction and a flagpole were installed. On 14 October, on the Feast of the Intercession of the Holy Virgin, the anniversary was celebrated with great pomp.

During the existence of the Kamianka Sich branch, certain work has been carried out: a bus tour called "Cossack Times – Zaporozhian Sich" has been introduced, a scientific concept for the development of the branch has been approved, and a staff unit has been created to work with tourists and organise excursions. As part of the preparations for the creation of an archaeological open-air museum, a graphic reconstruction of a Cossack kurin (hut) was carried out based on the results of archaeological research. However, since 2010, the implementation of plans to transform the Kamianka Sich into a cultural and educational centre has been suspended: due to changes in the country's domestic policy and the arrival of a new oblast administration, the project has not been funded.

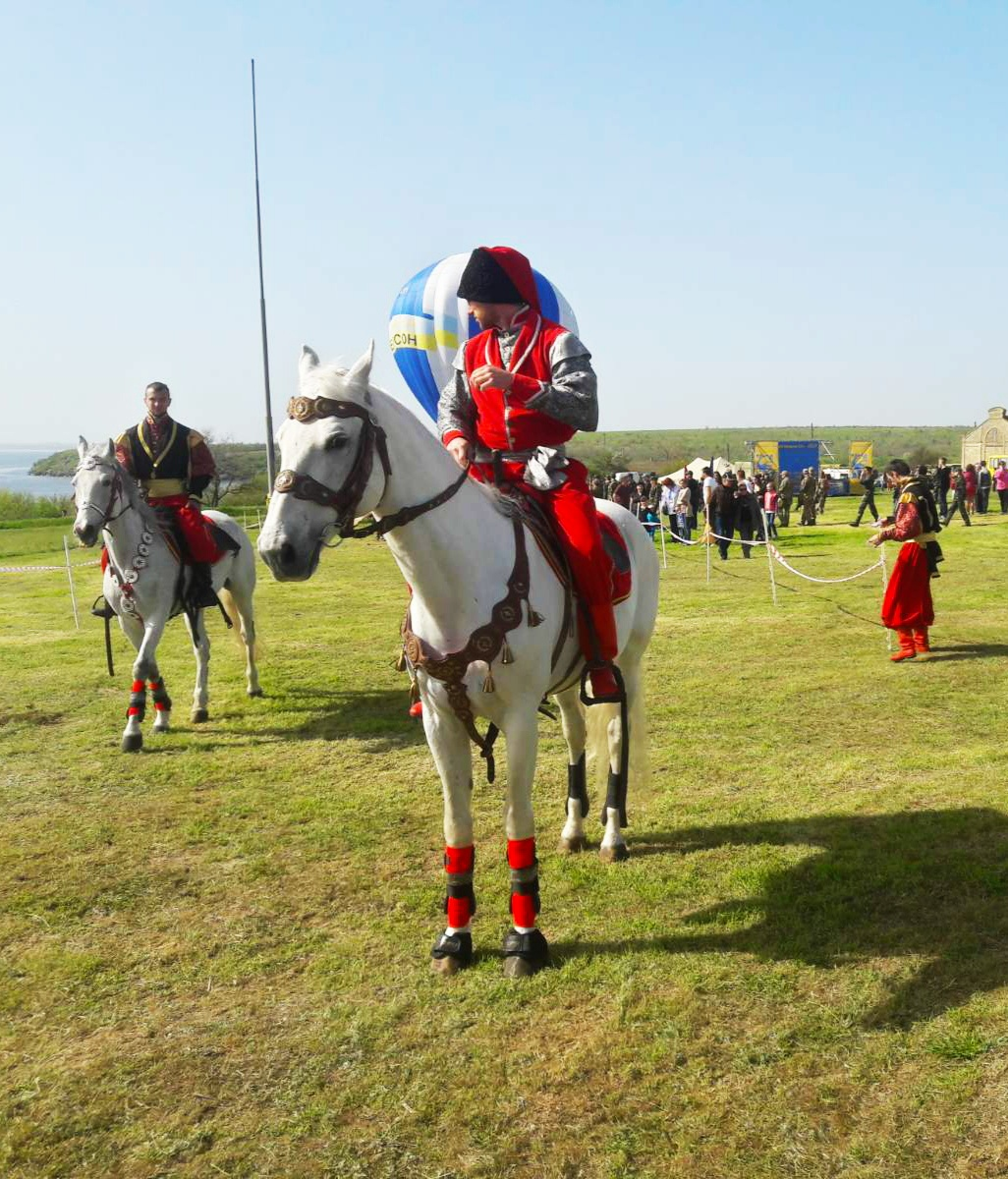
"Cossack Hart - 2017" historical and cultural festival on the territory of the Kamianka Sich

Subsequently, a tourist route was laid out at the Kamianka Sich, and since 2016, in honour of the founding of the Sich, which falls on 1 May, the regional authorities have been organising a festival here to mark the opening of the tourist season in Kherson Oblast. Every year, mass events are held here to commemorate memorable dates in the history of the Zaporozhian Cossacks: the day of remembrance of Kost Hordiienko (early May), the day commemorating the Zaporozhian Sich (early June), and the feast of the Intercession of the Holy Virgin (14 October). Representatives of Cossack associations, local authorities and the public take part in the events.

On 1 February 2024, during the Russian invasion of Ukraine, the monument was destroyed by three Russian aerial bombs.

== Tourism ==
Within two years of the Kherson Oblast State Administration promoting the Kamianka Sich, it became a new tourist brand for Kherson Oblast, similar to Khortytsia in Zaporizhzhia. In 2018, around 8,000 tourists travelled along the new road to the village of Respublikanets, located 95 km from the regional centre. For many travellers who visited the Kamianka Sich during the opening days of the tourist season on 30 April and 1 May, it was their first time there. A separate location for the event was an exhibition-presentation of the tourist potential of Kherson Oblast. The Henichesk, Skadovsk, Oleshky, Chaplynka, Beryslav, Hola Prystan, Bilozerka, and Kalanchak raions, as well as the cities of Nova Kakhovka, Hola Prystan, Kherson, and the Prysyvashshia hromada, demonstrated why tourists should choose them. As for the Kamianka Sich, it was highlighted as the only one of the seven Sich settlements that has survived to this day after the creation of the Kakhovka Reservoir.

According to historians, it is a unique historical and archaeological monument of the Zaporozhian Cossacks, as all three main components of the Sich have been preserved here:

- the kish, which included huts, treasuries, and the Sich square;
- the suburbs with production workshops;
- the Cossack cemetery with the preserved grave of the outstanding kish otaman Kost Hordiienko and a mound erected on it.

== Kamianka Sich National Nature Park ==
The Kamianka Sich National Nature Park was established by Decree of the President of Ukraine Petro Poroshenko dated 11 April 2019 No. 140/2019. This is a unique area of Pontic fescue-feather grass steppes on the Right Bank, with a variety of plants and animals listed in the Red Book of Ukraine, which is recognised as part of the Emerald Network.

In the territories adjacent to the Kamianka Sich, the Kamianka Sich National Nature Park has been in the design stage since 2009. In line with current trends in understanding the landscape as an integral natural and cultural system, authorities reported in 2009 that comprehensive preservation of natural and historical monuments would be implemented here. The park will be equally important for nature conservation and historical and cultural significance.

The park includes the lands of Mylove rural and Novoraisk settlement hromadas in Beryslav Raion. The planned site is located on the territory of the Balka Kamianka River and Milivska Balka and has six particularly valuable areas that were to be designated as protected areas: Serednokamianska (284.9 ha), Slonivska (394.4 ha), Hlybochanska (474.2 ha), Kolodiazna (753.4 ha), Ternuvatska (454.2 ha) and Marhurivska (344 ha). According to the Decree, during 2019–2021, 6,013.241 hectares of land shall be granted for permanent use to the Kamianka Sich National Nature Park, including land seized from land users.

As of 2014, the flora of the unique nature reserve included 582 species of vascular plants. Among them were 52 rare species. In addition, the territory preservesd the remains of about 150 burial mounds and ancient settlements, a manor house, and an ancient monastery.

== Sources ==
- Кам'янська Січ // Українське козацтво в Таврії. — Херсонський портал АртКавун.
- Голобородько Ю. Кам'янська Січ: Іст. нарис // Степ: Літ.-мистец. альм. — Херсон, 1993. — Вип.1. — С. 54-64.
- Dmytro Yavornytsky, History of the Zaporizhian Cossacks.
  - Yavornytsky, Dmytro Ivanovych (1990a) [1892]. Історія запорозьких козаків. Том 1 [History of the Zaporizhian Cossacks. Volume 1] (in Ukrainian). Kyiv: Naukova Dumka. p. 596. ISBN 5-12-001243-4. (general overview of the territory of the Cossacks, their organisation and way of life). Пер. з рос. І. І. Сварника; Упоряд. О. М. Апанович; Худож. В. М. Дозорець. — Л.: Світ, 1990. — 319 с.: іл. — Бібліогр. в підрядк. прим. Кам'янська Січ, С. 93.
  - Yavornytsky, Dmytro Ivanovych (1990b) [1895]. Історія запорозьких козаків. Том 2 [History of the Zaporizhian Cossacks. Volume 2] (in Ukrainian). Kyiv: Naukova Dumka. p. 566. ISBN 5-12-002051-8. (history until 1686)
  - Yavornytsky, Dmytro Ivanovych (1993) [1897]. Історія запорозьких козаків. Том 3 (1686–1734) [History of the Zaporizhian Cossacks. Volume 3 (1686–1734)] (PDF) (in Ukrainian). Kyiv: Naukova Dumka. p. 588. ISBN 5-12-002052-6. (history until 1734)
- Паталах О. Ю. Форпости козацької волі / Паталах О. Ю., Голобородько Ю. К. — Херсон, 1992. — 28 с.: іл. Кам'янська Січ, С. 7-15.
