= Valeriy Smoliy =

Ukrainian historian (born 1950)

Valeriy Andriyovych Smoliy MFST Валерій Андрійович Смолій
- Born: 1 January 1950 (age 76); Avratyn, Kamianets-Podilsk Oblast, Ukrainian SSR
- Citizenship: Ukraine
- Education: Kamyanets-Podilsky Institute
- Scientific career
- Fields: History
- Workplaces: Institute of History of Ukraine, National Academy of Sciences of Ukraine

Valeriy Smoliy (Ukrainian: Валерій Андрійович Смолій) is a Ukrainian academician, historian, and director of the NASU Institute of History of Ukraine.

== Career ==
Smoliy was born on 1 January 1950 in the village of Avratyn, Volochysk Raion, Kamianets-Podilskyi Oblast.

In 1970, he graduated from the historical faculty of the Kamianets-Podilskyi State Pedagogic Institute. After that, Smoliy worked as a rural teacher in schools in Ternopil Oblast and as a teacher assistant at the Nizhyn Pedagogic Institute.

Since 1972, Smoliy has worked at the NASU Institute of History of Ukraine. In 1975 he defended his candidate thesis "Union of the right-bank Ukraine with Ukrainian lands within the Russian state" (Ukrainian: Возз'єднання Правобережної України з українськими землями у складі Російської держави) and in 1985 his doctorate thesis "Social consciousness of Ukrainian national movements participants (second half of the 17th-18th centuries)" (Ukrainian: Суспільна свідомість учасників народних рухів України (друга половина XVII–XVIII ст.)). Since 1986, Smoliy has been heading one of the departments of the institute. In 1991, he was elected deputy director of the institute. In 1992, he was admitted to the National Academy of Sciences of Ukraine as a corresponding member.

Since 1993, Smoliy has been a director of the NASU Institute of History of Ukraine. In 1995, he became a full member, an academician, of the National Academy of Sciences of Ukraine.

In 1997–1999, Smoliy served as a Vice-Prime Minister on humanitarian issues in the government of Valeriy Pustovoitenko.

== Works ==
- 2011 — Petro Doroshenko. Political portrait. (Петро Дорошенко. Політичній портрет. — К, 2011)
- 2004 — My Ukraine (Моя Україна. — К., 2004 та ін.)
- 2003 — Ukraine. Progress of history (Україна. Поступ історії. — К., 2003.)
- 2002 — Bohdan Khmelnytskyi: A biographic essay (Богдан Хмельницький: Біографічний нарис. — К., 2002.)
- 2002 — Ukraine of the 20th century (Україна XX століття: У 2 кн. — К., 2002.)
- 1999 — The Ukrainian national revolution of the mid-17th century: problems, searches, decisions (Українська національна революція середини XVII століття: проблеми, пошуки, рішення. — К., 1999.)
- 1997 — The idea of Ukrainian statehood in the 17th-18th centuries: problems of formation, evolution, realization (Українська державна ідея XVII–XVIII століть: проблеми формування, еволюції, реалізації. — К., 1997.)
- 1994 — History in biographies (Історія в життєписах. — К., 1994.)
- 1993 — Bohdan Khmelnytskyi: A social and political portrait (Богдан Хмельницький: соціально-політичний портрет. — К., 1993; 2-е вид., перероб. і доп. — К., 1995.)
- 1993 — Right-bank Ukraine in the second half of the 17th-18th centuries: problem of state creation (Правобережна Україна у другій половині XVII–XVIII ст.: проблема державотворення. — К., 1993.)
- 1992 — In search of new understanding of the 17th-century liberation war of the Ukrainian people (У пошуках нової концепції Визвольної війни українського народу XVII ст. — К., 1992.)
- 1991 — How and when started the Ukrainian nation started to form (Як і коли почала формуватися українська нація. — К., 1991.)
- 1986 — Formation of social consciousness of the people masses of Ukraine during the class struggle (second half of the 17th-18th centuries) (Формування соціальної свідомості народних мас України в ході класової боротьби (друга половина XVII–XVIII ст.). — К., 1986.
- 1978 — The Union of right-bank Ukraine with Russia (Возз'єднання Правобережної України з Росією. — К., 1978.)

Government offices
Preceded by Ivan Kuras	Vice Prime Minister (on humanitarian policy); 11 August 1997 – 18 August 1999	Succeeded by Mykola Zhulynskyi
