= Encyclopedia of History of Ukraine =

Ukrainian encyclopedia

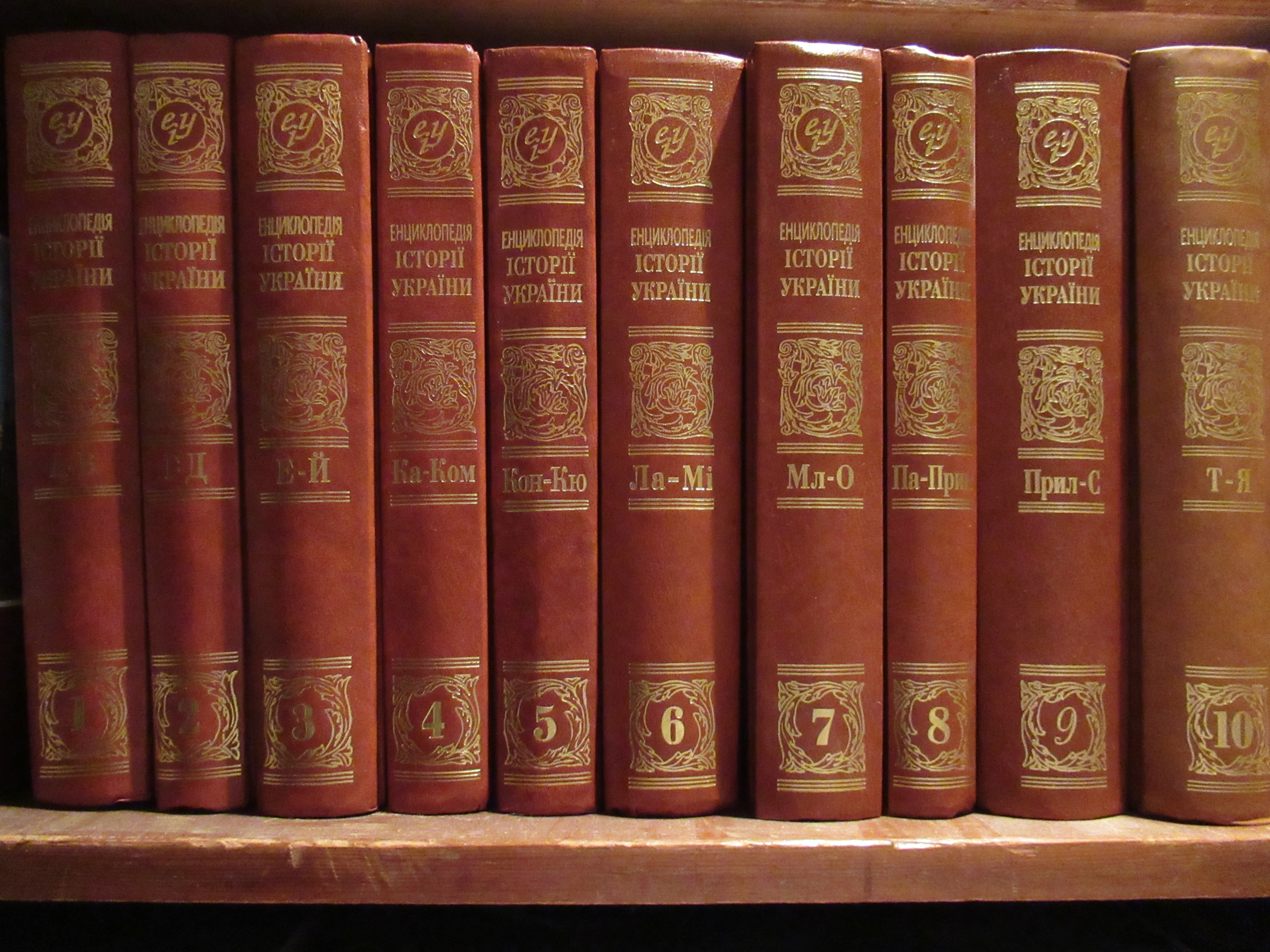
- Language: Ukrainian
- Subject: General
- Genre: encyclopedia
- Publisher: NASU Institute of Encyclopaedic Research
- Publication date: 2003
- Publication place: Ukraine
- Media type: printed and online versions
- ISBN: 966-00-0632-2
- Website: http://resource.history.org.ua

Encyclopedia of History of Ukraine (Ukrainian: Енциклопедія історії України, ЕІУ) is an illustrated encyclopedia on history of Ukraine in 10 volumes. It was published in Ukrainian language in 2003–2013 and 2019 in Kyiv by the Naukova Dumka academic publishing house under auspices of the NASU Institute of History of Ukraine (National Academy of Sciences of Ukraine) headed by Valeriy Smoliy.

== Description ==
At the end of 1980s there has unfolded a scientific research work connected with theoretical rethinking of the own history, research of its "bleached spots", particularly in its Soviet past, elaboration of a new periodization of historical process, finding the right place of Ukrainian history in history of humanity. Special attention was paid to preparation of documental collections, research of historical heritage of 19th through beginning of 20th centuries, development of unattended in a recent past special historical disciplines.

In the mid of 1990s through beginning of 2000s in creative work accumulation of the NASU Institute of History of Ukraine, a number of synthetic innovative works have appeared, among which are studying handbook edited by Valeriy Smoliy "History of Ukraine: new vision" (Ukrainian: Історія України: нове бачення, 1995–1996, in a revised version also came out in 1997, 2000, 2002), collective monographs: "Ukraine: establishment of an independent state. 1991–2001 (Ukrainian: Україна: утвердження незалежної держави. 1991—2001, 2001); "Outlines of history of diplomacy of Ukraine" (Ukrainian: Нариси з історії дипломатії України, 2001); "Political terror and terrorism in Ukraine. 19th–20th centuries. Historical outlines" (Ukrainian: Політичний терор і тероризм в Україні. XIX—XX ст. Історичні нариси, 2002); "Famine 1932–1933 in Ukraine: causes and consequences" (Ukrainian: Голод 1932—1933 рр. в Україні: причини та наслідки, 2003) and others. Important generalizing works became the 15 volume edition "Ukraine through centuries" (Ukrainian: Україна крізь віки, responsible editor Valeriy Smoliy) and the 3 volume edition "Ancient history of Ukraine" (Ukrainian: Давня історія України, responsible editor Petro Tolochko).

A special attention is deserved by paleographic works that were released in Ukraine and Russia from the end of 1980s. In particular, the Hrushevsky Institute of Ukrainian archaeography and source studies of the National Academy of Sciences of Ukraine republished a classical heritage of national historiography of the end of 19th through beginning of 20th centuries as well as many works of historians that were created outside of Ukraine. There are quite a few publications on the most controversial issues of historical science on account of the NASU Institute of History of Ukraine, Krypiakevych Institute of Ukrainian Studies, Vernadsky National Library of Ukraine. Fundamental collection of documents were published today almost on all issues that until recently were little studied.

Fruitful work of historians over the past decade and a half created a proper basis for a radical rethinking of the concept of homeland history, overcoming stereotypes and mythologems of the Soviet era.

== See also ==
- Encyclopedia of Modern Ukraine
- Ukrainian Soviet Encyclopedia
