= Institute of History of Ukraine =

Research institute in Ukraine

Coordinates: 50.450813°N 30.528620°E

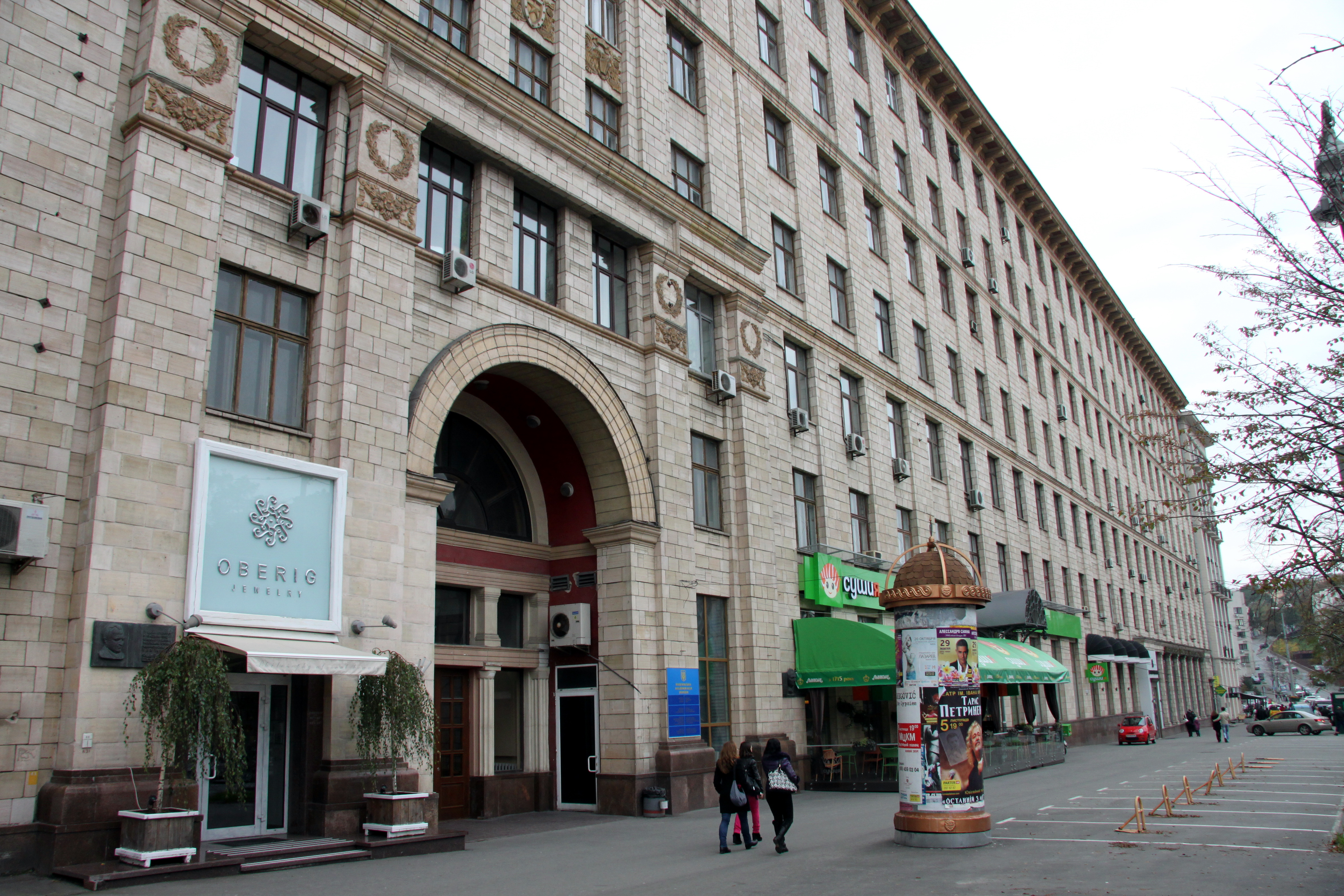
- Building where the institute is located (September 2013)
- Established: 1936
- Head: Valeriy Smoliy
- Address: 4 Hrushevsky Street
- Location: Kyiv, Ukraine
- Website: history.org.ua

Institute of History of Ukraine is a research institute in Ukraine that is part of the National Academy of Sciences of Ukraine department of history, philosophy and law and studies a wide spectrum of problems in history of Ukraine. The institute is located in Kyiv.

== History ==
The institute was established on the decision of the Central Committee of the Communist Party of Ukraine on July 23, 1936, and the Presidium of Academy of Sciences of the Ukrainian SSR on July 27, 1936, based on several departments and commission of the academy and the All-Ukrainian Association of Marx-Lenin Institutes (VUAMLIN).

Original it was composed of three departments: history of Ukraine in feudalism epoch, history of Ukraine in epoch of capitalism and imperialism, and history of Ukraine in Soviet period.

After the Soviet annexation of eastern Poland during the World War II, in Lviv, Western Ukraine was established a branch of the institute, which was headed by Ivan Krypiakevych. After the war in 1946, the branch was liquidated. In 1951 the Lviv branch was revived as part of the UkrSSR Academy of Science Institute of Social Studies (today known as the NASU Krypiakevych Institute of Ukrainian Studies).

During World War II, the institute was evacuated to Ufa, Bashkir ASSR where it along with the UkrSSR AS Institute of Archaeology became a department of history and archaeology of the UkrSSR AS Institute of Social Studies. It returned to Kyiv on 25 March 1944. On 17 July 1944 the institute was reconstituted with four departments: history of feudalism, history of capitalism, history of Soviet period, history of archaeography. In 1945 the Institute of History of Ukraine had a staff of 13 scientists, including 3 doctors of sciences and 7 candidates of sciences.

On 9 June 1944, the All-Union Committee in affairs of Higher School confirmed its pre-war decision for providing the faculty council of the institute the right to accept for review candidate dissertations and award based on thesis defense a science degree of candidate of historical sciences specializing in "History of Ukraine" and "History of the USSR". In 1950 the institute had eight departments history of feudalism, history of capitalism, history of Soviet society, military history, history of countries of people's democracy, historiography and historical funds, worldwide history and international relations, archaeography.

In the spirit of the 1947 Central Committee of the Communist Party of Ukraine guidelines, there was prepared a dual volume book "History of Ukrainian SSR" (1953–1957). In connection with the celebration of the 300th Anniversary of Ukraine's annexation to the Russian state there were prepared a collection of documents "The Union of Ukraine with Russia" (Russian: Воссоединение Украины с Россией, Moscow, 1953), written texts to the collective monograph "the 1648-1654 Liberation War and union of Ukraine with Russia" (Kyiv, 1954). Since 1955 the institute had six departments history of Soviet society, history of capitalism, history of feudalism, history of countries of people's democracy, worldwide history and international relations, archaeography. In 1960 the department of history of Soviet society was split into two histories of the Great October Socialist Revolution and civil war, history of socialist and communist development.

=== 1944 criticism ===
On 17 May 1944, Fedir Yenevych, the director of the Ukrainian branch of the Marx-Engels-Lenin Institute of Central Committee of the All-Union Communist Party (Bolsheviks), wrote a memorandum "about shortcomings in work of the UkrSSR AS Institute of History of Ukraine". At the institution were thrown existence of important flaws or inadequate elucidation of certain problematic issues

- completely not highlighted political history before times of Kyivan Rus;
- in disorder highlighted the issue of emergence and formation of the Ukrainian nation;
- some historians adhere to a false statement about "annexation of Galicia by Poland";
- historians use inaccurate terminology such as 1st, 2nd, and 3rd partitions of Poland (this "old, worn-out, and completely inaccurate" terminology has to be changed with new, scientific; the use of outdated terminology play into the hands of leadership of the Polish emigration government like General Władysław Sikorski who stated that the Soviet Union continues the policy of Catherine the Great and carried out the 4th partition of Poland);
- the Ukrainian Cossack State of 16-17th centuries (Cossack Hetmanate) is characterized one-sidedly, historians do not follow the instructions of Friedrich Engels that "tendency on creation of national states, which acts more clearly and more consciously, is one of the most significant levers of progress in Middle Ages" and did not reveal internal motives (political, economical, and cultural) of emergence of the Ukrainian Cossack State; they failed to stress that emergence of the Ukrainian Cossack State in those days was a progressive step forward compared to previous Lithuanian and Polish state arrangements in Ukraine;
- one-sidedly highlighted the reason for Ukraine annexation to Russia (Muscovite Tsardom), the 1654 act (the 1654 March Articles) was "not the beginning of union of Ukrainian and Russian nations, but political and legal arrangement of de facto existing through the ages union of those people which one day was intentionally broken by foreign invaders";
- inadequately highlighted the issue of two pre-Revolutionary Russia (officially reactionary and democratic)
- false reference of Ukrainian nationalism to national face (characteristics) of Ukrainian people;
- inadequately motivated victory of Socialist revolution in Ukraine;
- inadequately highlighted historiography of Ukraine;
- others.

On 29 August 1947, the Central Committee of the Communist Party of Ukraine (Bolsheviks) adopted a statement "About political mistakes and unsatisfactory work of the UkrSSR AS Institute of History". In the statement, the institute was accused in "serious mistakes and rough distortion", "remnants of bourgeoisie nationalistic views" in works of selected staff workers, and next to that was placed a "combat mission", to prepare Marxist–Leninist "Short course of history of Ukraine".

== Ukrainian Historical Journal ==
Ukrainian Historical Journal
- Discipline: European history
- Language: Ukrainian
- Edited by: Valeriy Smoliy

Publication details
- History: 1957–present
- Publisher: Institute of History of Ukraine

Standard abbreviations
- ISO 4: Ukr. Hist. J.

Indexing
- ISSN: 0130-5247 (print); 1729-570X (web)

Links
- Journal homepage

The Ukrainian Historical Journal (Ukrainian: Український історичний журнал, romanized: Ukrains’kyi istorychnyi zhurnal) is published semi-monthly by the institute. The journal was founded in 1957, and is indexed in the America: History and Life, Historical Abstracts, Modern Language Association Database bibliographic databases. It is currently edited by Valeriy Smoliy (1995–present), who succeeded Yuriy Kondufor (1979–1988).

== Building ==
Beside the Institute of History of Ukraine, the building also houses other research institutes of the National Academy of Sciences of Ukraine, the Krymsky Institute of Oriental Studies, the Rylsky Institute of Art Studies, Folklore and Ethnology, the Shevchenko Institute of Literature, the Institute of the Ukrainian Language and the Potebnia Institute of Linguistics.

During the events of Euromaidan in winter of 2014, near the building were erected the Hrushevsky Street barricades.

== Directors ==
- 1936 – 1936 Artashes Saradzhev
- 1936 – 1941 Serhiy Byelousov
- 1942 – 1947 Mykola Petrovskyi, member-correspondent
- 1947 – 1964 Oleksandr Kasymenko
- 1964 – 1967 Kuzma Dubyna
- 1968 – 1973 Andriy Skaba, academician
- 1973 – 1978 Arnold Shevelev, member-correspondent
- 1978 – 1993 Yuriy Kondufor, academician
- 1993 – present Valeriy Smoliy, academician

== See also ==
- 2014 Hrushevskoho Street riots
- Oleksiy Tolochko
