= Samiylo Kishka =

Nobleman and kish otaman

Samiylo Kishka (Ukrainian: Самійло Кішка, Polish: Samuel Koszka, born approximately in 1530 – died in 1602 (1620) was a nobleman of Dołęga coat of arms from Bratslav. He was a kish otaman of the Zaporozhian Sich (1574–1575), and an appointed Hetman of the Registered Cossacks (1600–1602). Samiylo Kishka headed the Cossack army in a range of sea campaigns against the Turks, Moldavian raids, the Livonian campaign (1600–1603), as well as a number of maritime campaigns against the Crimean Khanate: Gezlev, Izmail, Ochakiv, and Ackerman.

== Biography ==
=== Early life ===
Samiylo Kishka was born in 1530 into a family of noblemen from Bratslav. At the age of twenty, he began to live as a Cossack. During the first years of being an active Cossack, he took part in several campaigns headed by Dmytro Vyshnevetsky, a Hetman of the Zaporozhian Cossacks, who built Khortytsia Castle, and is therefore sometimes considered the founder of the first Zaporozhian Sich. Being an ordinary Cossack, he confronted Tatar attacks on the Ukrainian lands.

=== Hetman of Zaporozhian Sich ===

Hetman Samiylo Kishka is famous for heading the Cossacks in successful naval expeditions against the Turks. In the late 1560s, he began leading sea campaigns against the Turks. Cossack campaigns brought much concern to the Ottoman Empire, so the sultan Selim II decided to use diplomatic and military means to influence Rzeczpospolita King Sigismund II Augustus. The King attempted to terminate the Cossacks' sea campaigns, but that tactic failed.

In 1573 Samiylo Kishka was defeated by the dominant Ottoman forces. He was taken prisoner and chained in a Turkish galley. He spent 25 years there until he escaped in 1599. His escape was the result of slaves' armed uprising. Afterward, he was elected Hetman for several more years.

In 1599 Samiylo Kishka helped the Polish king in a war with the Walachians in Moldavia, where he organized land raids.

In 1600 Samiylo Kishka started negotiations with King Sigismund III Vasa and managed to achieve Poland's recognition of the Cossacks as a social stratum. Additionally, the King supported a campaign against the Crimean Khanate.

Later in 1600, the Polish king received help from the Cossacks in Polish–Swedish War (1600–1629). Kishka took 2,000–4,000 Zaporozhian Cossacks that fought on the Polish side for several years. Kishka aimed to repeal anti-Cossack legislation. Additionally, certain payments for participation in military campaigns, in addition to maintenance costs, were agreed upon.

In 1602, during that campaign, Samiylo Kishka died in the Siege of Fellin (present-day Viljandi in Estonia). The Cossacks elected another commander and continued to fight, though they ceased being paid by the Polish government. Consequently, they resorted to looting local towns and villages for sustenance and other needs.

== In art ==
There are some historical songs and Dumas with moral and patriotic ideological subtext that are dedicated to Samiylo Kishka.

Borys Yanovsky wrote the epic opera A Song of the Black Sea about Hetman Samiylo Kishka and his Zaporizhian Cossacks in Turkish captivity.

== See also ==
- Zaporozhian Host
- Kish otaman
- Duma about Samiilo Kishka

== Bibliography ==
- Holobutsky, Petro Volodymyrovych (2007). "КІШКА Самійло" [Samiylo Kishka]. Encyclopedia of History of Ukraine (in Ukrainian). Vol. 4. Kyiv: Institute of History of Ukraine. p. 341.
