= Zaporozhian Sich =

16th to 18th-century Cossack polity in modern southern Ukraine

Free Lands of the Lower Zaporozhian Host Вольностi Вiйська Запорозького Низового (Ukrainian)
- c. 1552–1775
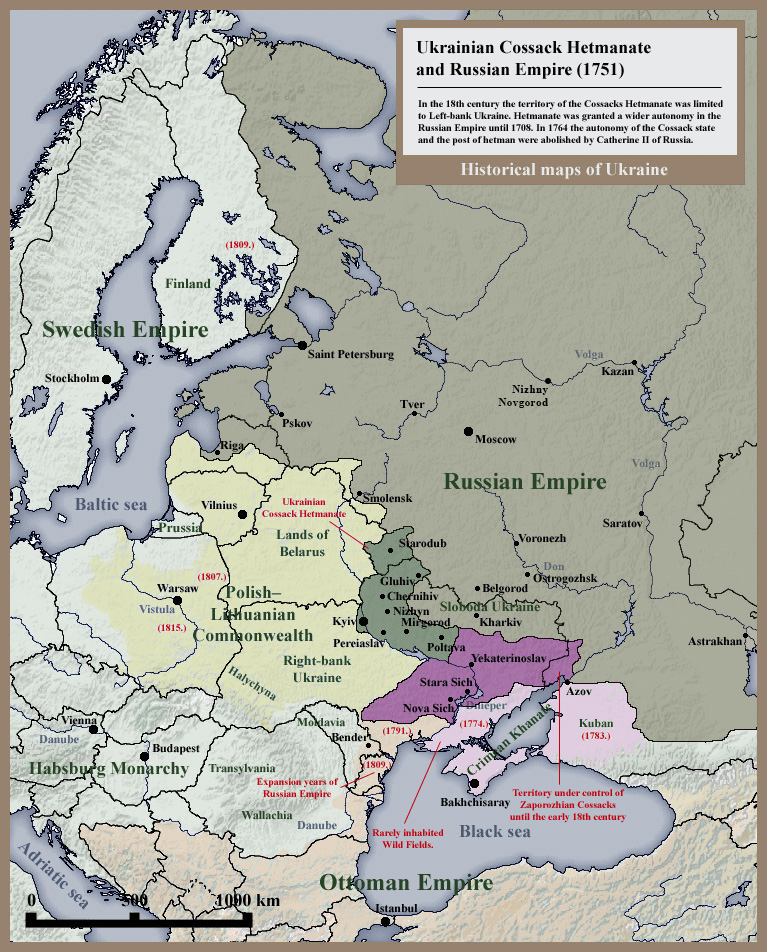
- Historical map of the Ukrainian Cossack Hetmanate (dark green) and the territory of the Zaporozhian Cossacks (purple) between the Russian Empire (khaki), the Crimean Khanate (pink) and the Polish–Lithuanian Commonwealth (yellow)
- Status: De facto independent De jure vassal of: Poland–Lithuania (1583–1654); Muscovy (1654-1709); Ottoman Empire (1711-1734); Russian Empire (1734-1775)
- Capital: Sich (various locations in Zaporozhia)
- Common languages: Church Slavonic (literary); Ruthenian (vernacular)
- Religion: Eastern Orthodox
- Demonyms: Zaporozhtsi (Zaporozhians), Sichovyky (Sich Cossacks), Rusyny (Ruthenians), Ukraintsi (Ukrainians), Nyzovyky (members of Lower host)
- Government: Cossack Republic
- Kish otaman
  - c. 1550s (first; disputed): Dmytro Vyshnevetsky (disputed; founder of Khortytsia Castle)
  - 1765-1775 (last): Petro Kalnyshevsky
- Historical era: Early modern period
  - Established: c. 1552
  - Liquidated by Catherine II: 1775

Population
  - 1650: c. 100,000
  - 1762: c. 183,700
Preceded by	Succeeded by
Wild Fields	Novorossiya Governorate; Danubian Sich
- Today part of: Ukraine

The Zaporozhian or Zaporizhian Sich (Note: /ˌzɑːpəˈriːʒən ˈsɪtʃ/ (za-puh-REE-zhun SITCH); also Zaporizhian Sich (Ukrainian: Запорізька Січ; Polish: Sicz Zaporoska; Russian: Запорожская Сечь) and other variants; see name) was a semi-autonomous polity and proto-state of Zaporozhian Cossacks that existed between the 16th and 18th centuries. For the latter part of that period, it was an autonomous stratocratic state within the Cossack Hetmanate. The lands of Zaporozhian Sich were centred around the Great Meadow region of Ukraine, spanning the lower Dnieper river. In different periods the area came under the sovereignty of the Polish–Lithuanian Commonwealth, the Crimean Khanate (itself a vassal of the Ottoman Empire), the Tsardom of Russia (Muscovy), and the Russian Empire.

The establishment of the Zaporozhian Sich was an important factor in the defense of Ukraine and Russia from Crimean-Nogai raids. Simultaneously, the Cossack raids originating from it caused similar destabilising effects in the region. In c. 1650, its total population consisted of 100,000. In 1657–1687, the Zaporizhian Sich was practically independent, possessing its own administration and armed forces consisting of 12,000–20,000 Cossacks. It was reliant on population growth, mainly consisting of Ukrainian refugees from devastated lands.

In 1775, shortly after Russia annexed the territories ceded to it by the Ottoman Empire under the Treaty of Küçük Kaynarca (1774), Catherine the Great disbanded the Sich. She incorporated its territory into the Russian province of Novorossiya.

The term Zaporozhian Sich can also refer metonymically and informally to the whole military-administrative organisation of the Zaporozhian Cossack host.

== Name ==
The name Zaporizhzhia refers to the military and political organization of the Cossacks and to the location of their autonomous territory 'beyond the rapids' (za porohamy) of the Dnieper River. The Dnieper rapids were a major portage on the north–south Dnieper trade route. The term sich is a noun related to the East Slavic verb sich (сѣчь), meaning 'to chop' or 'cut'; it may have been associated with the usual wood sharp-spiked stockades around Cossack settlements.

The full, official name of the polity centred around the Sich was the Free Lands of the Lower Zaporozhian Host (Ukrainian: Вольностi Вiйська Запорозького Низового, romanized: Volnosti Viyska Zaporozkoho Nyzovoho), where host is a name for a large army or other military congregation.

The Sich was located in the region around the Great Meadow (Velykyi Luh) in today's south-eastern Ukraine, which was flooded by the Kakhovka Reservoir from the construction of the Kakhovka Dam in 1956 until its destruction in 2023. The area was also known under the historical term Wild Fields.

== History ==
A possible precursor of the Zaporozhian Sich was a fortification (sich) built on the Tomakivka island the Tomakivka Sich, in the middle of the Dnieper in the present-day Zaporizhzhia region of Ukraine. However, there is no direct evidence about the exact time of the existence of Tomakivka Sich, whereas indirect data suggest that at the time of Tomakivka Sich there was no Zaporozhian Sich yet.

The history of the Zaporozhian Sich spans six time-periods:

- the emergence of the Sich (construction of Khortytsia Castle, 1550s) (1471–1583)
- as part of the Lesser Poland Province of the Polish Crown by inclusion in the Kiev Voivodeship (1583–1657)
- the struggle against the Rzeczpospolita (the Polish-Lithuanian state), the Ottoman Empire, and the Crimean Khanate for the independence of the Ukrainian part of the Rzeczpospolita (Commonwealth) (1657–1686)
- the struggle with the Crimean Khanate, the Ottoman Empire, and the Russian Empire for the unique identity of the Cossacks (1686–1709)
- the standoff with the Russian government during its attempts to cancel the self-governing of the Sich, and its fall (1734–1775)
- the formation of the Danubian Sich outside the Russian Empire and finding ways to return home (1775–1828)

=== Formation ===
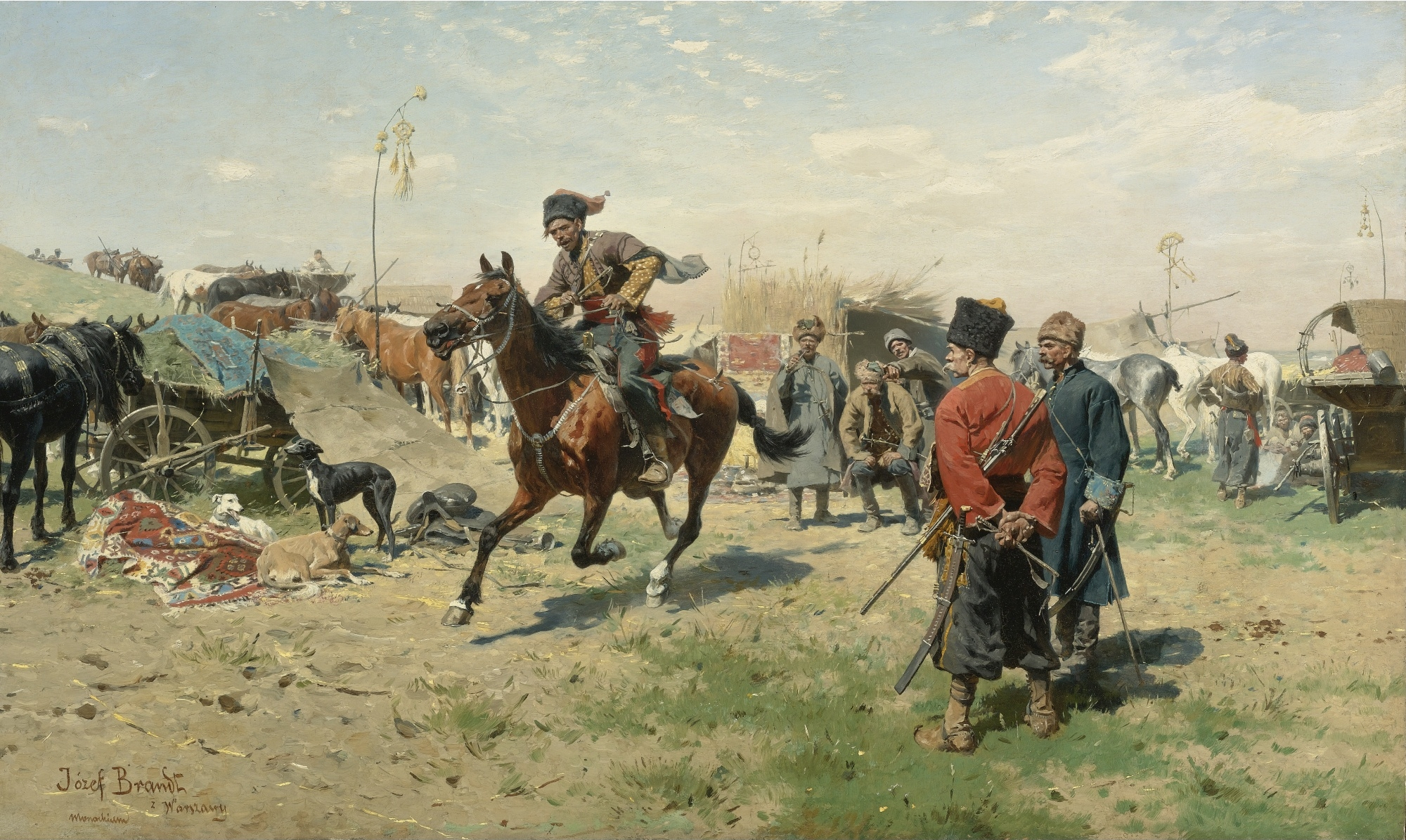
"Zaporizhians" by Józef Brandt

The Zaporozhian Sich emerged as a method of defence by Slavic colonists against the frequent and devastating raids of Crimean Tatars, who captured and enslaved hundreds of thousands of Ukrainians, Belarusians and Poles to supply the Crimean slave trade in operations called "the harvesting of the steppe". The Ukrainians created a self-defence force, the Cossacks, to stop the Tatars, and built sichs, fortified camps that were later united to form a central fortress, the Zaporozhian Sich.

The location of the Sich, just beyond the Dnieper rapids was a key factor for the development and organisation of the early Cossack movement. The nine different rapids on this 70 kilometres (43 mi) long part of the river made navigation upstream (towards Kyiv) by boat practically impossible, as the boats had to be left or slowly portaged across. Sailing downstream, while easier, was also dangerous and required intimate knowledge of the area. This protected the areas north of the rapids from Ottoman expansion whilst also limiting the ability of the Polish-Lithuanian Commonwealth to fully control the area south of them.

Despite the steppe south of the rapids being largely flat and suitable for the nomadic Tatars, the immediate area of the Sich was difficult to traverse, largely due to being dominated by a large wetland known as the Great Meadow (Ukrainian: Великий Луг). Littered with hundreds of small islands, marshes and woods, the Great Meadow also provided the Zaporozhians with plentiful pasture, game and honey. This made it an attractive and defensible outpost for access to the surrounding Wild Fields.

In the 1550s, prince Dmytro Vyshnevetsky built Khortytsia Castle at a location only known as "Little Khortytsia Island"; it is disputed whether this was "the first Zaporozhian Sich" or not. He placed a Cossack garrison there; Crimean Tatar forces destroyed the fortress in 1558. The Tomakivka Sich was built on a now-inundated island to the south, near the modern city of Marhanets; the Tatars also razed that sich in 1593. A third sich soon followed, the Bazavluk Sich, which survived until 1638, when it was destroyed by a Polish expeditionary force suppressing a Cossack uprising. These settlements, founded during the 16th century, were already complex enough to constitute an early proto-state.

=== Struggle for independence ===
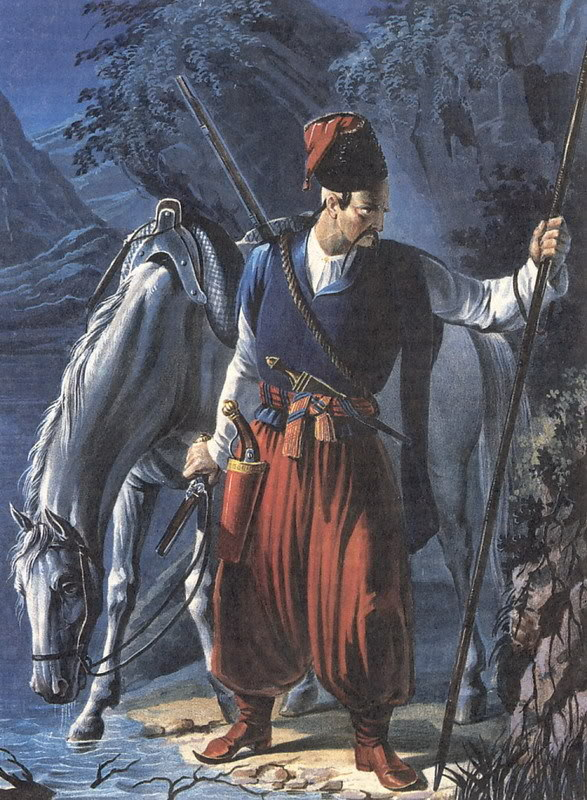
Zaporozhian Cossack, 18th century.

The Zaporozhian Cossacks became included in the Kiev Voivodeship from 1583 to 1657, which was part of the Lesser Poland Province of the Kingdom of Poland. They resented Polish rule, however. One of the reasons being religious differences, as the cossacks were Eastern Orthodox Christians whereas the Poles were mostly Catholics. They thus engaged in a long struggle for independence from surrounding powers, the Polish–Lithuanian Commonwealth (I Rzechpospolita), the Ottoman Empire, the Crimean Khanate, and the Tsardom of Russia, later the Russian Empire. The Sich became the centre of Cossack life, governed by the Sich Rada alongside its Kish otaman (sometimes called a hetman from German Hauptmann).

In 1648, Bohdan Khmelnytsky captured the Mykytyn Sich at Mykytyn Rih, near the current city of Nikopol, Ukraine. From there the Khmelnytsky Uprising began against the I Rzechpospolita that led to the establishment of the Cossack Hetmanate (1648–1764).

After the Pereiaslav Agreement with the Tsar in 1654, the Zaporozhian Host was split into the Hetmanate, with its capital at Chyhyryn, and the more autonomous region of Zaporizhzhia, which continued to be centred on the Sich. During this period, the Sich changed location several times but was generally located in the Great Meadow. The Chortomlyk Sich was built at the mouth of the Chortomlyk River in 1652. In 1667 the Truce of Andrusovo made the Sich a condominium ruled jointly by Russia and the Polish–Lithuanian Commonwealth.

During the reign of Peter the Great, Cossacks were used to construct canals and fortification lines in northern Russia. An estimated 20–30 thousand were sent each year. Hard labour led to a high mortality rate among builders, and only an estimated 40% of Cossacks returned home.

In advance to the Battle of Poltava in 1709, the Chortomlyk Sich (sometimes referred to as the "Old Sich" (Stara Sich)) was destroyed and Baturyn, the capital of Hetman Ivan Mazepa, was razed. Another sich was built at the mouth of the Kamianka river, the Kamianka Sich, but was destroyed in 1711 by the Russian government. The Cossacks then fled to the Crimean Khanate to avoid persecution and founded the Oleshky Sich in 1711 (today the city of Oleshky). In 1734, they were allowed to return to the Russian Empire. Suffering from discrimination in the Khanate, Cossacks accepted the offer to return and built another Sich close to the former Chortomlyk Sich, referred to as the Nova Sich.

According to the 1756 Zaporozhian Sich register, only 12,758 of whom were Cossack lived across the Sich territories, a low figure due to frequent raids by Crimean Tatars. The population in the steppes numbered around 52,000 in the year 1768.

Fear of the independence of the Sich resulted in the Russian administration abolishing the Hetmanate in 1764. The Cossack officer class was incorporated into the Russian nobility (Dvoryanstvo). However, rank and file Cossacks were reduced to peasant status, including a substantial portion of the old Zaporozhians. Tension rose after the Treaty of Küçük Kaynarca, when the need for a southern frontier ended after the annexation of the Crimea. The Imperial colonisation of Novorossiya (New Russia) with Serbs and Romanians created further conflict. After the end of the war between Russia and the Ottoman Empire for possession of the Black Sea and Crimean steppes, Russia no longer needed the Zaporozhian Cossacks for protection of the border region. Russia finally destroyed the Zaporozhian Sich through military force in 1775.

=== Destruction and aftermath ===
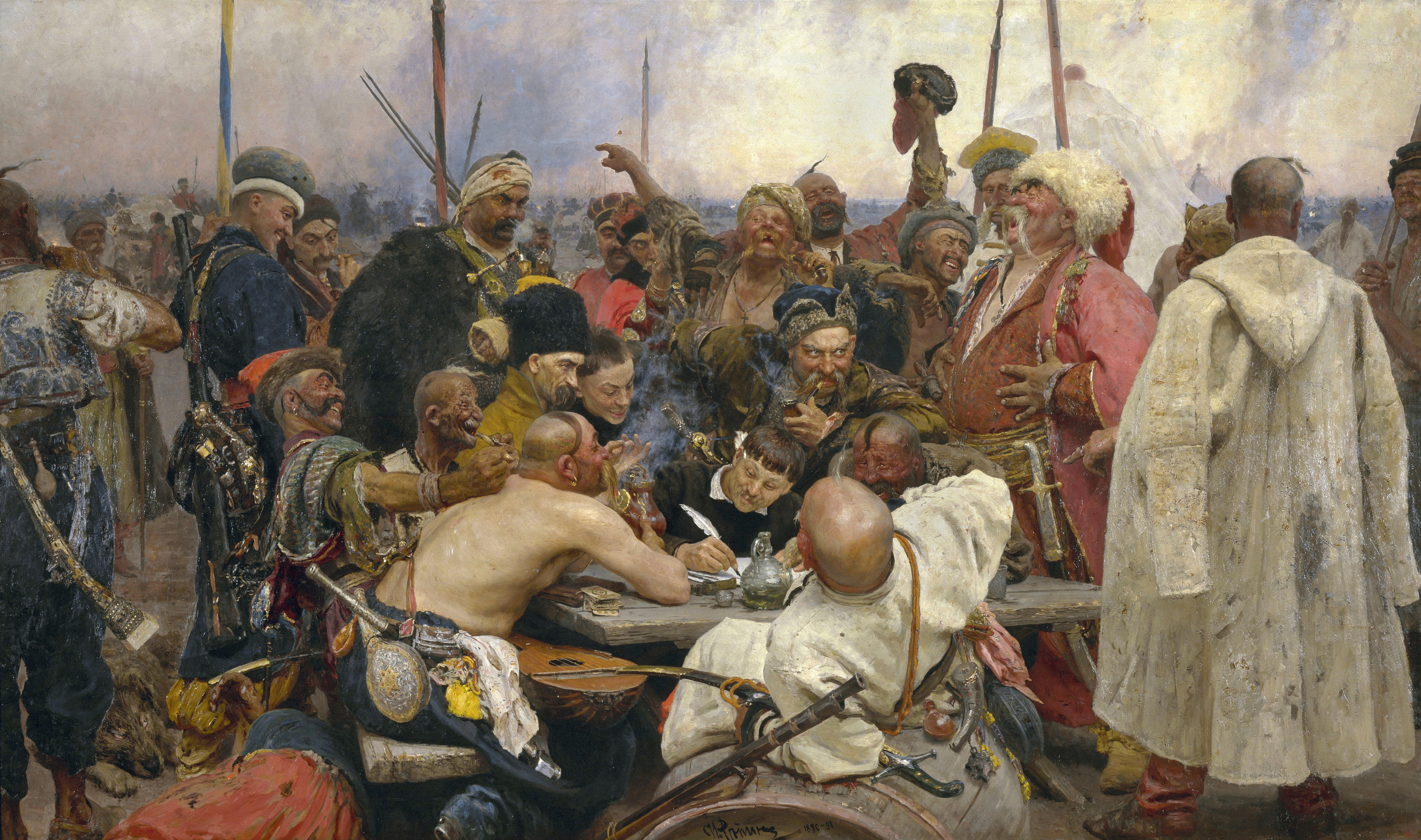
Cossacks compose an answer to a letter from the Ottoman Sultan, (Reply of the Zaporozhian Cossacks, by Ilya Repin)

In May 1775, Russian General Peter Tekeli received orders to occupy and destroy the Zaporozhian Sich from Grigory Potemkin, who had been formally admitted into Cossackdom a few years earlier. Potemkin was given direct orders from Catherine the Great. On 5 June 1775, Tekeli surrounded the Sich with artillery and infantry. He postponed the assault and even allowed visits while the head of the Host, Petro Kalnyshevsky, decided how to react to the Russian ultimatum. The Zaporozhians chose to surrender. The Sich was officially disbanded by the 3 August 1775 manifesto of Catherine, "On the Liquidation of Zaporozhian Sich and Annexation thereof to Novorossiya Governorate", and the Sich was razed to the ground.

Some of the Cossack officer class, the starshyna, became hereditary Russian nobility and obtained huge lands despite their previous attempts to relocate the Sich to North America or Australia. Under the guidance of a starshyna named Lyakh, a conspiracy was formed among a group of fifty Cossacks to pretend to go fishing on the Inhul next to the Southern Buh in the Ottoman provinces and to obtain fifty passports for the expedition. The pretext was enough to allow about 5000 Zaporozhians to flee, some travelling to the Danube Delta, where they formed a new Danubian Sich as a protectorate of the Ottoman Empire. Others moved to Hungary to form a Sich there as a protectorate of the Austrian Empire. According to folklore, some moved to Malta, because Kosh otamans and other senior members of the starshyna considered themselves a kind of Maltese chivalry.

The leader of the Zaporozhian Host, Petro Kalnyshevsky, was arrested and exiled to the Solovetsky Islands (where he lived to the age of 112 in the Solovetsky Monastery). Four high-level starshynas were repressed and exiled, later dying in Siberian monasteries. Lower level starshynas who remained and went over to the Russian side were given army ranks and all the privileges that accompanied them, and allowed to join Hussar and Dragoon regiments. Most of the ordinary Cossacks were made peasants and even serfs.

In 1780, after disbanding the Zaporozhian Cossack Host, Potemkin attempted to gather and reorganize the Cossacks voluntarily, and they helped to defend Ukraine from the Turks during the Russo-Turkish War (1787–1792). He gathered almost 12,000 Cossacks and called them the Black Sea Cossacks. After the conflict was over, rather than allowing the Cossacks to settle across Southern Ukraine, the Russian government began to resettle them on the Kuban River. In 1860, they changed their name to the Kuban Cossacks.

Ukrainian writer Adrian Kashchenko (1858–1921) and historian Olena Apanovych note that the abolition of the Zaporozhian Sich had a strong symbolic effect. Memories of the event remained for a long time in local folklore.

== Organization and government ==
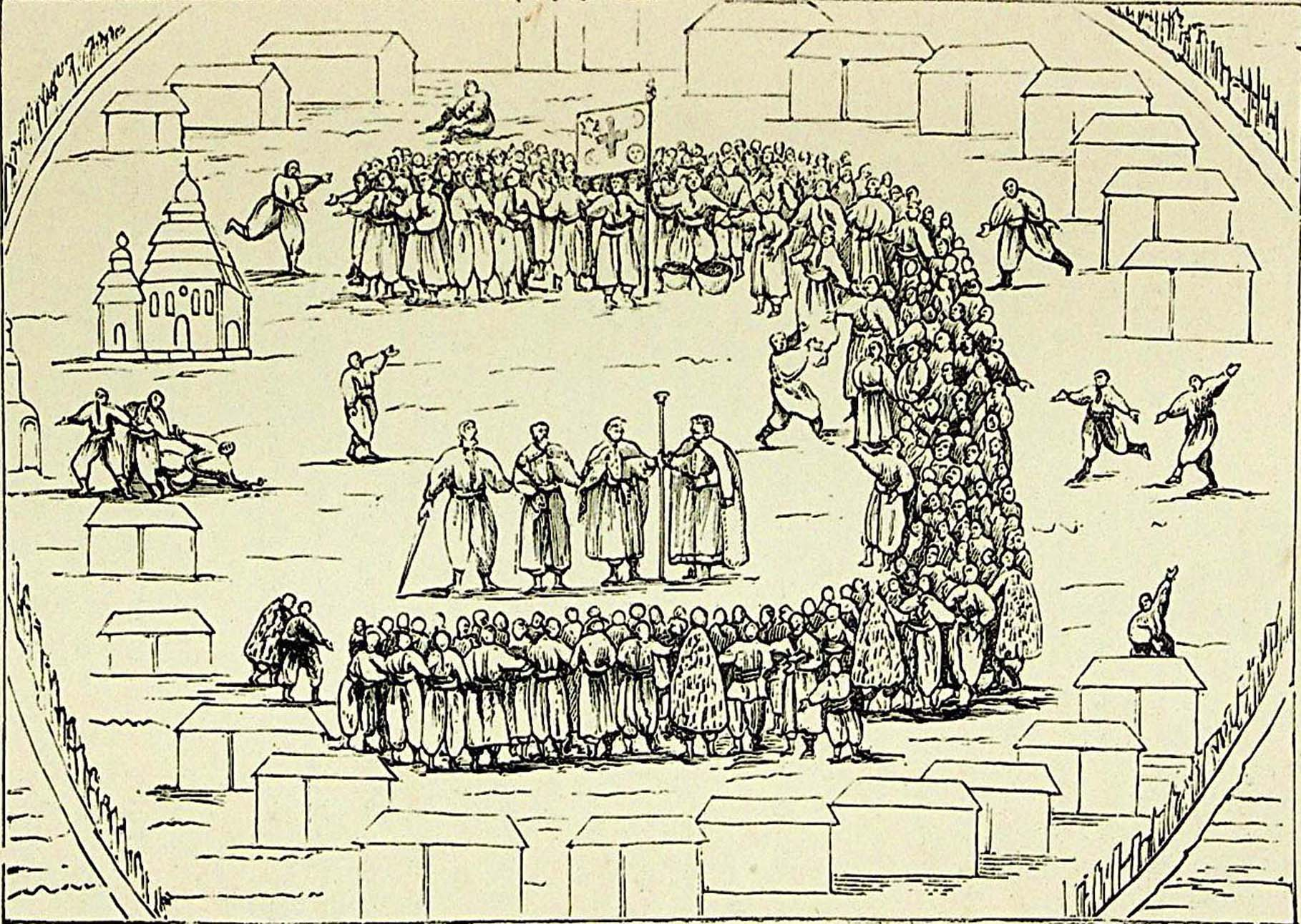
A Zaporozhian Sich Rada (Council)

The Zaporozhian Host was led by the Sich Rada that elected a Kish otaman as the host's leader. He was aided by a head secretary (pysar), head judge, and head archivist. During military operations the Otaman carried unlimited power supported by his staff as the military collegiate. He decided with an agreement from the Rada whether to support a certain Hetman (such as Bohdan Khmelnytsky) or other leaders of state.

Some sources refer to the Zaporozhian Sich as a "Cossack republic", because the highest power in it belonged to the assembly of all its members, and its leaders (starshyna) were elected. The Cossacks formed a society (hromada) that consisted of "kurins" (each with several hundred Cossacks). A Cossack military court severely punished violence and stealing among compatriots, the bringing of women to the Sich, the consumption of alcohol in periods of conflict, and other offenses. The administration of the Sich provided Orthodox churches and schools for the religious and secular education of children.

The population of the Sich had a cosmopolitan component, including Ukrainians, Moldavians, Tatars, Poles, Lithuanians, Jews, Russians and many other ethnicities. The social structure was complex, consisting of destitute gentry and boyars, szlachta (Polish nobility), merchants, peasants, outlaws of every sort, runaway slaves from Turkish galleys, and runaway serfs (as the Zaporozhian polkovnyk Pivtorakozhukha). Some of those who were not accepted to the host formed gangs of their own, and also claimed to be Cossacks. However, after the Khmelnytsky Uprising these formations largely disappeared and were integrated mainly into Hetmanate society.

=== Administrative subdivision ===
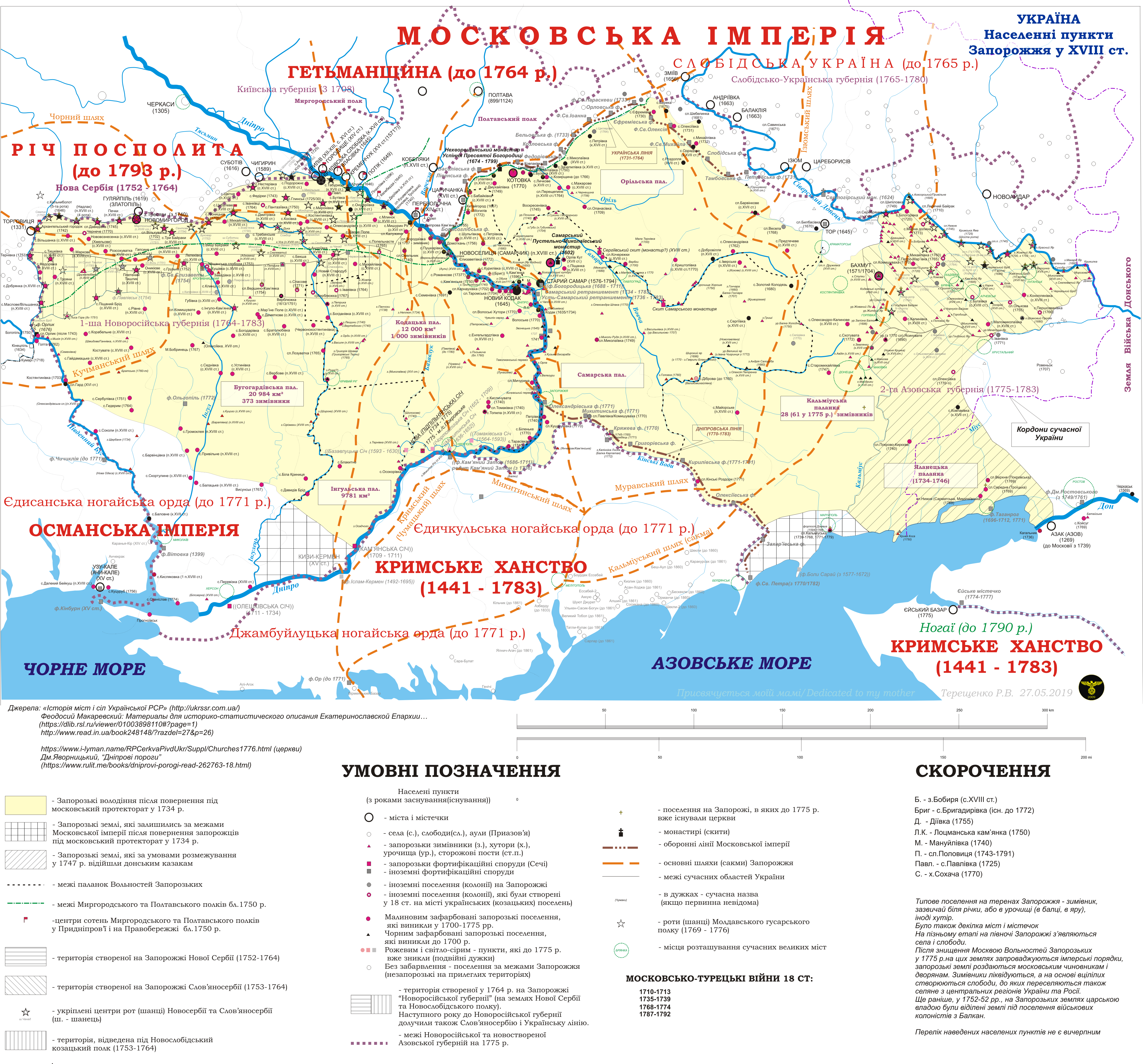
Lands of the Zaporizhia in the Russian Empire in 1775

In the 17th century, the Lower Host was subdivided into 5 palankas (palatinates): Buh Hard, Kalmius, Kodak, Pereviz, and Samara. Later, three additional palankas were created: Oril, Protovcha, and Prohnoi.

The administrative center of each palanka was a sloboda with a small fortification housing a Cossack garrison. Each palanka was headed by a colonel (polkovnyk), who held the military, administrative, judicial, and financial powers.

- Buh Hard Palanka
- Kalmius Palanka
- Kodak Palanka
- Pereviz Palanka
- Samara Palanka
- Oril Palanka
- Protovcha Palanka
- Prohnoi Palanka

=== Army and warfare ===
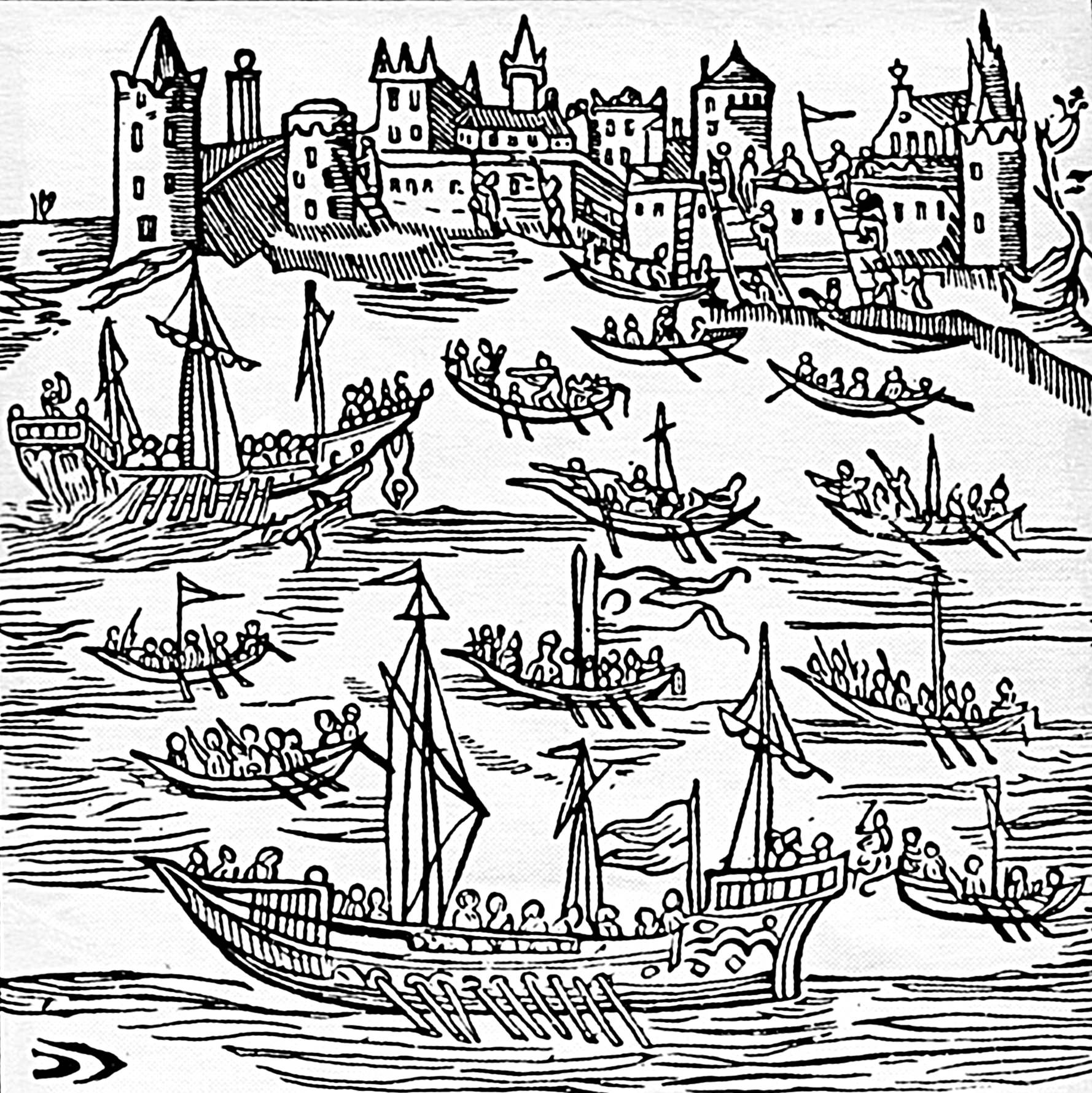
17th century woodcut showing Zaporozhian Cossacks in chaikas, destroying the Turkish fleet and capturing Caffa in 1616.

The Zaporozhians, besides their formidable status as infantrymen, also developed a large and sophisticated maritime presence. Their vessels were often constructed out of bundled reeds from the Great Meadow, which made them difficult to sink even after taking in much water. As their primary opponents on the sea, the Ottomans, largely relied on larger galleys, the Zaporozhians would head for shallower waters if faced with a superior enemy fleet, then conceal themselves within the reeds. The Danube Delta, in particular, was often host to Cossacks for months a time, as it provided a good area from which to raid Ottoman shipping on the Danube and surrounding sea.

The Zaporozhians developed a large fleet of fast, light vessels. Their campaigns were targeted at rich settlements on the Black Sea shores of the Ottoman Empire, and several times took them as far as Constantinople and Trabzon (formerly Trebizond).

=== Zaporozhian Sich locations ===
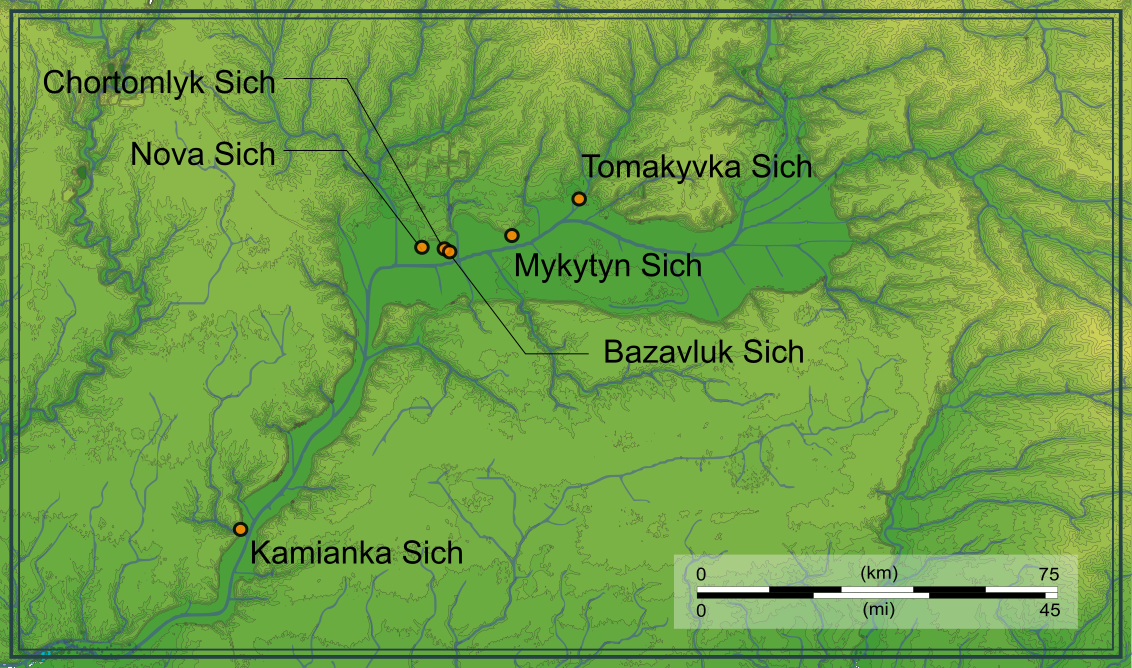
Sichs of the Great Meadow.

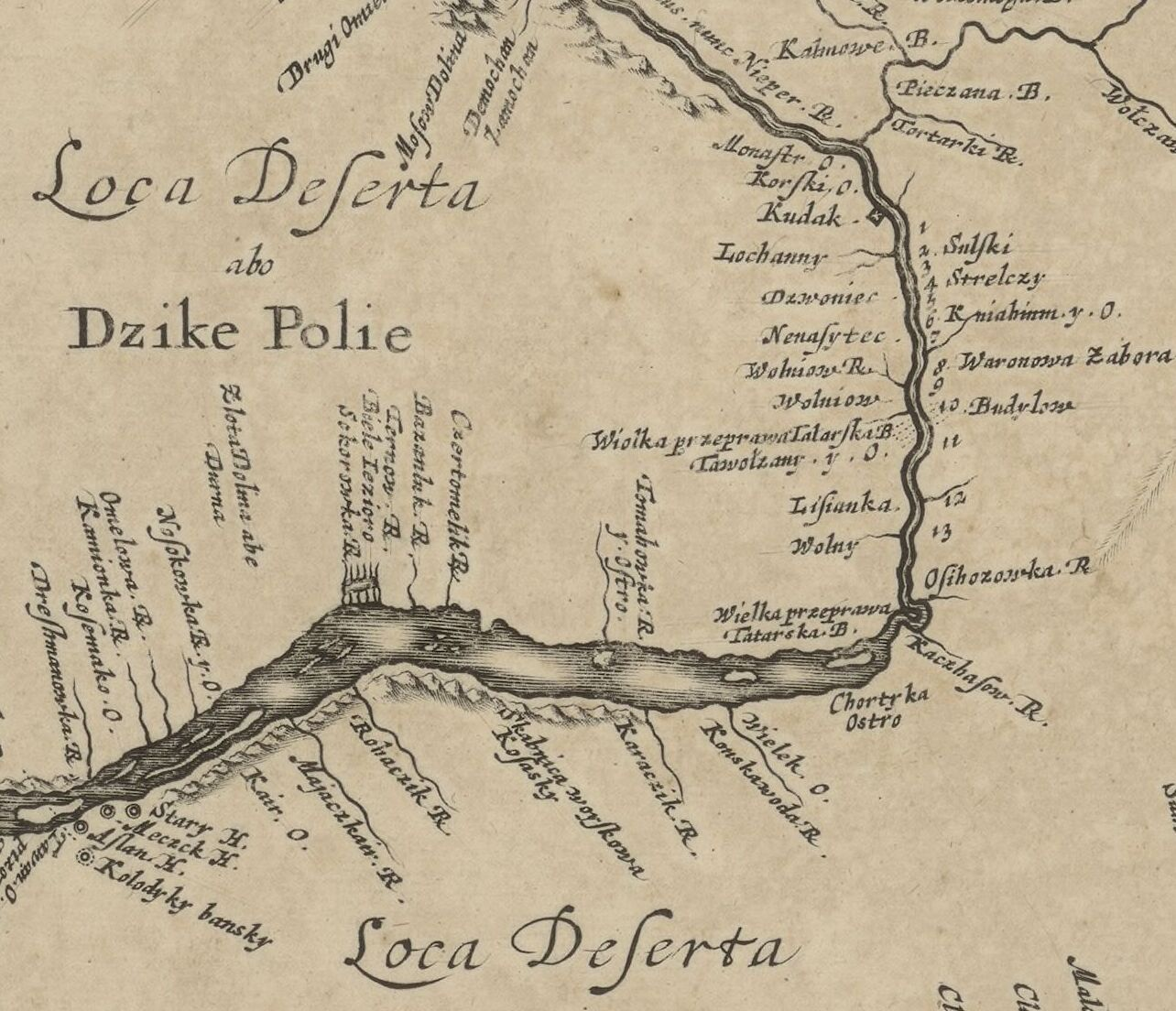
Fragment of Beauplan's Typus generalis Ukrainae of the Dnipro Rapids and the Sich islands downstream

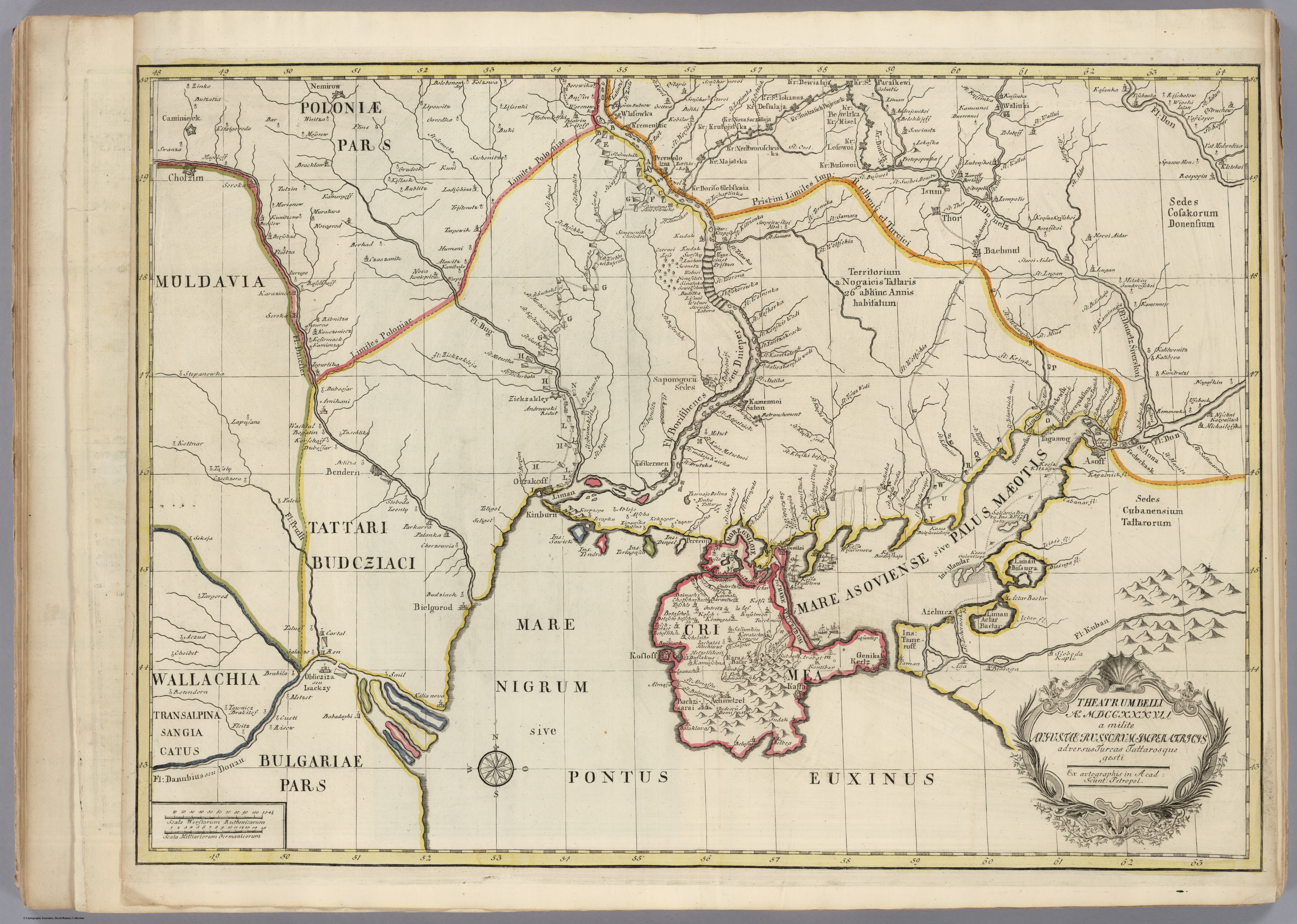
Imperial Russia's 1737 military campaign in the Pontic Steppes with the Sich on Bazavluk and Pidpilna rivers

- Khortytsia Castle (c. 1550s); its status as "the first sich" is disputed
  - location of "Little Khortytsia Island" unclear, disputed between "Baida Island" near Khortytsia (today part of Zaporizhzhia) and a tract of Steppe near the Kichkas crossing (now flooded by the Dnipro Reservoir)
- Tomakivka Sich (c. 1564–1593); its status as "the first sich" is disputed
  - Great Meadow, formerly submerged (located near today's Marhanets)
- Bazavluk Sich (1593–1638)
  - Great Meadow, formerly submerged (located near the modern village of Kapulivka, Nikopol Raion)
- Mykytyn Sich (1639–1652)
  - Nikopol
- Chortomlyk Sich (1652–1709; 1728–1730)
  - Great Meadow, formerly submerged (located near today's village of Kapulivka, Nikopol Raion)
- Kamianka Sich (1709–1711; c. 1728–1734)
  - near village of Respublikanets, Beryslav Raion
- Oleshky Sich (1711–1728)
  - eastern outskirts of the city of Oleshky
- Nova (Pidpilnenska) Sich (1734–1775)
  - Great Meadow, formerly submerged near the village of Pokrovske, Nikopol Raion (about same location of Chortomlyk and Bazavluk)

=== Zaporozhian Sichs and their leaders ===
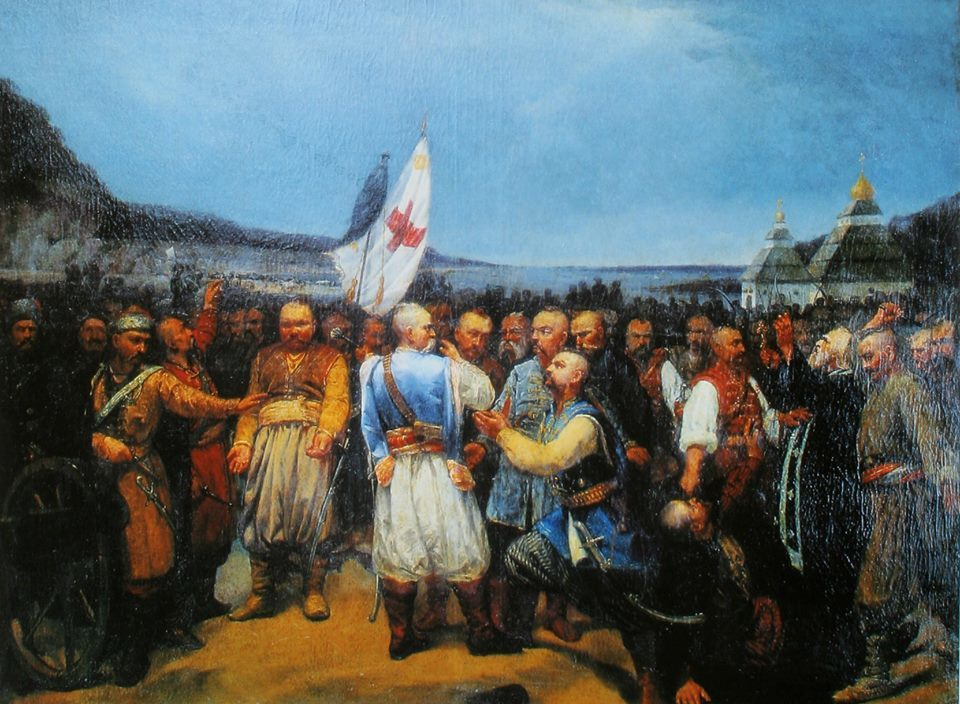
Last Rada on Sich, by Viktor Kovalyov

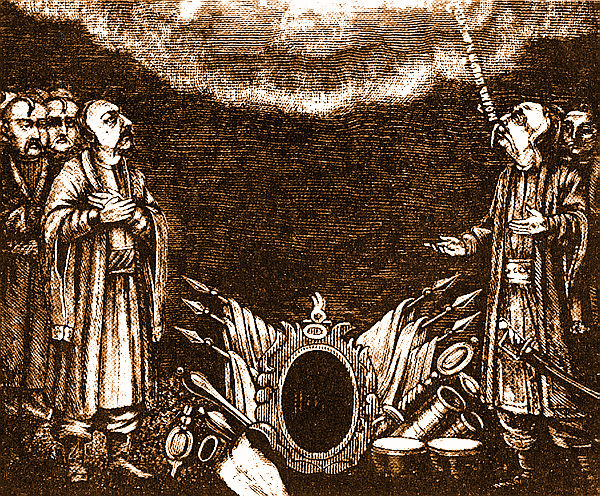
Zaporozhian Cossacks Prayer, fragment of the icon of Protection of Holy Virgin Mary.

As Kish Otamans also known as "Hetmans":

- Khortytsia Castle (1556–1558)
  - Dmytro Vyshnevetsky (1556–1558)
- Tomakivka Sich (1564–1593)
  - Wężyk Chmielnicki (1534–1569)
  - Mykhailo Vyshnevetsky (1569–1570)
  - Iwan Swiergowski (1574)
  - Samiylo Kishka (1574–1575)
  - Bohdan Ruzhynski (1575–1576)
  - Jacub Szach (1576–1578)
  - Ivan Pidkova (1577–1578)
  - Lukyan Chornynsky (1578)
  - Jan Oryszowski (1581)
  - Samuel Zborowski (1581–1584)
  - Bohdan Mokoshynsky (1584)
  - Mykhailo Ruzhynski (1585)
  - Zakhar Kulaha (1585)
  - Bohdan Mokoshynsky (1586)
  - Lukyan Chornynsky (1586)
  - Demyan Skalozub (1585–1589)
  - Krzysztof Kosiński (−1593)
- Bazavluk Sich (1593–1638)
  - Hryhoriy Loboda (1593–1596)
  - Bohdan Mokoshynsky (1594)
  - Jan Oryszowski (1596)
  - Severyn Nalyvaiko (1596)
  - Khrystofor Netkovsky (1596–1597)
  - Hnat Vasylevych (1596–1597)
  - Tykhin Baybuza (1597–1598)
  - Fedir Polous (1598)
  - Semen Skalozub (1599)
  - Samiylo Kishka (1600–1602)
  - Havrylo Krutnevych (1602–1603)
  - Ivan Kutskovych (1602–1603)
  - Ivan Kosyi (1603)
  - Kaletnyk Andriyevych (1609–1610)
  - Olifer Holub (1622–1623)
  - Mykhailo Doroshenko (1623–1625)
  - Kaletnyk Andriyevych (1624–1625)
  - Marko Zhmailo (1625)
  - Mykhailo Doroshenko (1625–1628)
  - Hryhoriy Chorny (1628–1630)
  - Ivan Sulyma (1628–1629)
  - Lev Ivanovych (1629–1630)
  - Taras Triasylo (1630)
  - Timothy Orendarenko (1630–1631)
  - Semen Perevyazka (1632)
  - Timothy Orendarenko (1632–1633)
  - Ivan Petrizhitsky–Kulaga (1632)
  - Andriy Didenko (1633)
  - Dorothy Doroshenko (1633)
  - Ivan Sulyma (1633–1635)
  - Sava Kononovych (1637)
  - Pavlo Pavliuk–But (1637)
  - Illyash Karayimovych (1638)
  - Yakiv Ostryanyn (1638)
  - Dmytro Hunia (1638)
- Mykytyn Sich (1639–1652)
  - Karpo Pivtora–Kozhukha (1639–1642)
  - Maksym Hulak (1642–1646)
  - Fedir Lutay (1647–1648)

As Kish Otamans formally subject to the Hetman of Zaporizhian Host:

- Mykytyn Sich (1639–1652)
  - Hutskyi (1650)
- Chortomlyk Sich (1652–1709)
  - Fedir Lutay (1652)
  - Pavlo Homin (1654–1657)
  - Yakiv Barabash (1657–1658)
  - Pavlo Homin (1658–1659)
  - Ivan Briukhovetsky (1659)
  - Petro Sukhoviy (1660)
  - Ivan Briukhovetsky (1661)
  - Ivan Velychko–Bosovskyi (1662)
  - Sashko Turovets (1663)
  - Ivan Sirko (1663)
  - Sashko Turovets (1664)
  - Ivan Sirko (1664)
  - Ivan Shcherbyna (1664–1665)
  - Levko Shkura (1665)
  - Ivan Kurylo (1665)
  - Ivan Velychko–Bosovskyi (1665)
  - Levko Shkura (1665–1666)
  - Ivan Zhdan–Rih (1666–1667)
  - Ostap Vasiutenko–Chemerys (1667)
  - Ivan Zhdan–Rih (1667)
  - Ivan Bilkovskyi (1668)
  - Lukash Martynovych (1669)
  - Mykhailo Khanenko (1669–1670)
  - Hryhoriy Pelekh (1670)
  - Lukash Martynovych (1671)
  - Yevseviy Shashol (1672)
  - Stepan Vdovychenko (1672)
  - Lukyan Andriyiv (1672–1673)
  - Ivan Sirko (1673–1680)
  - Ivan Stiahaylo (1680–1681)
  - Trokhym Voloshanyn (1681–1682)
  - Vasyl Oleksiyenko (1682)
  - Hryhoriy Yeremeyev (1682–1684)
  - Hryhoriy Sahaidachnyi (1686)
  - Fedir Ivanyk (1686)
  - Filon Lykhopiy (1687)
  - Hryhoriy Sahaidachnyi (1687)
  - Filon Lykhopiy (1688)
  - Ivan Husak (1688–1689)
  - Fedko Husak (1689)
  - Ivan Husak (1690–1692)
  - Vasyl Kuzmenko (1692–1693)
  - Ivan Husak (1693)
  - Semen Ruban (1693–1694)
  - Ivan Sharpylo (1694)
  - Petro Pryma (1694–1695)
  - Maksym Samiylenko (1695)
  - Ivan Husak (1695)
  - Yakiv Moroz (1696–1697)
  - Hryhoriy Yakovenko (1697–1698)
  - Martyn Stukalo (1698–1699)
  - Petro Pryma (1699–1700)
  - Herasym Krysa (1701)
  - Petro Sorochynskyi (1701–1702)
  - Kost Hordiienko (1702)
  - Herasym Krysa (1703)
  - Kost Hordiienko (1703–1706)
  - Lukash Tymofiyenko (1706–1707)
  - Petro Sorochynskyi (1707)
  - Tymofiy Fenenko (1708)
  - Kost Hordiyenko (1708–1709)
- Kamianka Sich (1709–1734)
  - Petro Sorochynskyi (1709–1710)
  - Yakym Bohush (1710)
  - Yosyp Kyrylenko (1710)
- Oleshky Sich (1711–1728)
  - Kost Hordiyenko (1711–1714)
  - Ivan Malashevych (1714–1720)
  - Kost Hordiienko (1720–1728)
  - Ivan Bilytskyi (1733)
- Nova Sich (1734–1775)
  - Ivan Malashevych (1734, 1734–36, 1737)
  - Ivan Bilytskyi (1735, 1738)
  - Kost Pokotylo (1739)
  - Yakiv Turkalo (1739–1740)
  - Ivan Cherevko (1740)
  - Stepan Umanskyi (1740)
  - Stepan Hladkyi (1741)
  - Semen Yeremiyevych (1742)
  - Yakym Ihnatovych (1744)
  - Vasyl Sych (1745–1747)
  - Pavlo Kozeletskyi (1747)
  - Marko Kazhan (1748)
  - Yakym Ihnatovych (1748–1749)
  - Oleksiy Kozeletskyi (1749–1750)
  - Ivan Kazhan (1750)
  - Vasyl Sych (1751)
  - Yakiv Ihnatovych (1752)
  - Pavlo Kozeletskyi (1752–1753)
  - Semen Yeremiyevych (1753)
  - Danylo Hladkyi (1753)
  - Yakym Ihnatovych (1754)
  - Hryhoriy Lantukh (1755–1756)
  - Fedir Shkura (1756)
  - Danylo Hladkyi (1757)
  - Hryhoriy Lantukh (1757–1758)
  - Oleksiy Bilytskyi (1759–1760)
  - Hryhoriy Lantukh (1761)
  - Stepan Rud (1762)
  - Petro Kalnyshevskyi (1762)
  - Hryhoriy Lantukh (1763)
  - Pylyp Fedoriv (1764)
  - Ivan Bilytskyi (1765)
  - Petro Kalnyshevskyi (1765–1775)
- Danubian Sich (1775–1828)
  - Andriy Liakh (1775–1778)
  - Abdula (1778)
  - Hardovyi (1778–1791)
  - Trokhym Pomelo (1791–1794)
  - Hnat Koval (1805–1809)
  - Samiylo Kalnybolotskyi (1809–1813)
  - Semen Moroz (1813–1815)
  - Vasyl Smyk (1815–1816)
  - Kindrat Riasnyi (1816–1817)
  - Ivan Taran (1817–1818)
  - Mykhailo Huba (1818–1819)
  - Vasyl Cherniha (1819–1820)
  - Vasyl Lytvyn (1820–1821)
  - Nykyfor Biluha (1821–1822)
  - Hrytsko Huba (1822–1823)
  - Semen Moroz (1823–1825)
  - Mykhailo Huba (1825–1826)
  - Vasyl Cherniha (1826)
  - Vasyl Nezamayivskyi (1826–1827)
  - Yosyp Hladkyi (1827–1828)
  - Mykhailo Chayka (1853–1870) – proclaimed Cossack otaman under Turkish command during the Crimean War

== See also ==
- History of the Cossacks
- Zaporozhian Cossacks
- Crimean–Nogai slave raids in Eastern Europe

== Bibliography ==
- Essen, Michael Fredholm von (2018). Muscovy's Soldiers. The Emergence of the Russian Army 1462–1689. Warwick: Helion & Company. ISBN 978-1-912390-10-6.
- Kondufor, Yuri (1986). A Short History of the Ukraine. Kyiv: Naukova Dumka.
- Kuzyk, Tetyana Leonidivna (2013). "Січ, як термін" [Sich, as a term]. Encyclopedia of History of Ukraine (in Ukrainian). Vol. 9. Kyiv: Institute of History of Ukraine. Archived from the original on 21 June 2026. (last updated 2021)
- Magocsi, Paul R. (1996). A History of Ukraine. Toronto: University of Toronto Press. ISBN 0-8020-0830-5.
- Ostapchiuk, Viktor (2019). "The Zaporozhian Cossacks and the Dnipro River Refugium". In Bernhardt, Johannes (ed.). Mediterranean Rivers in Global Perspective. ISBN 978-3-657-78636-7.
- Палій, Олександр (2017). Історія України [History of Ukraine] (in Ukrainian). Vol. 3. Kyiv: К.І.С. ISBN 978-617-684-166-1.
- Plokhy, Serhii (2022). The Gates of Europe: A History of Ukraine. New York, NY: Basic Books. p. 414. ISBN 978-0-465-07394-8.
- Shcherbak, Vitaliy Oleksiyovych (2005). "Запорозька Січ" [Zaporozka Sich]. Encyclopedia of History of Ukraine (in Ukrainian). Vol. 3. Kyiv: Institute of History of Ukraine. pp. 270–275. Archived from the original on 24 June 2026.
