= Nova Sich =

1734–75 Cossack polity in Great Meadows city-fortress of southern Ukraine

Coordinates: 47.53037°N 34.15810°E

Pidpilnenska Sich Підпільненська Сiч (Ukrainian)
- 1734–1775
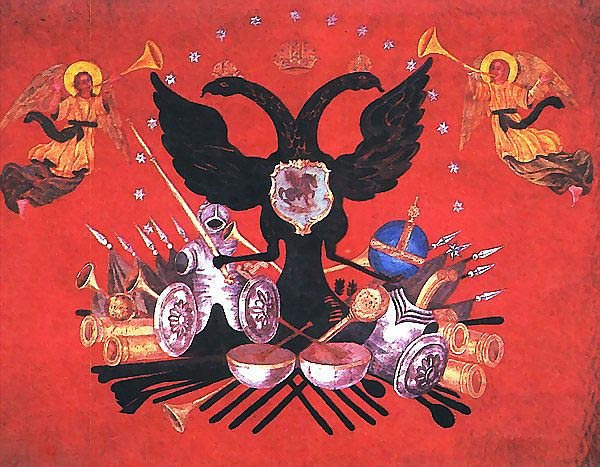
- Korogva Coat of arms

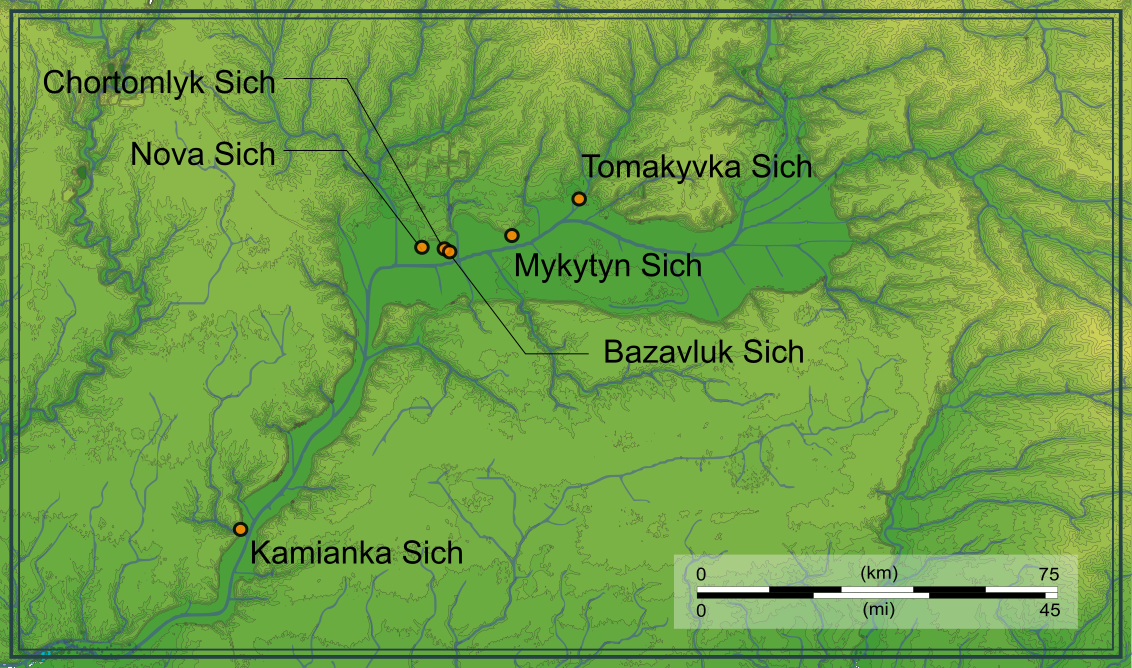
- Siches of the Great Meadow.
- Status: Cossack host
- Common languages: Ukrainian
- Religion: Eastern Orthodoxy
- Government: Cossack Republic
- Otaman-Hetman, Kish otaman, i.a.
  - (first) 1734, 1734—1736, 1742: Ivan Malashevych
  - 1762, 1765–1775 (last): Petro Kalnyshevsky (12 terms)
- Historical era: Early modern period
  - Established: 1734
  - Re-established: 1775
- Currency: All European currencies
Preceded by
Oleshky Sich
Chortomlyk Sich
Kamianka Sich
Succeeded by
Danubian Sich
Black Sea Cossack Host
- Today part of: Great Meadow, Ukraine

The Nova Sich (Ukrainian: Нова Січ, lit. 'New Sich') or Pidpilna Sich (Підпільненська Січ, Pidpilnenska Sich) was the administrative and military center of the Zaporozhian Cossacks in 1734–1775, established after the return of the Zaporozhian Host's Lowland Army unto the Russian protectorate as a result of the signing of the Lubny Treaty. The last Zaporozhian Sich settled in the former lands of Davnia or Stara Sich (Ukrainian: Давня or Стара Січ, lit. 'Old Sich', hence the name Nova) and centered on a large peninsula, washed by the Pidpilna River (a tributary of the Dnieper).

== Establishment ==
The Nova Sich was founded with the permission and under the supervision of the Russian government on 31 March 1734, by Ataman-Hetman I. Malashevich on the Right Bank of the Dnieper in the Great Meadow, which occupied 26 thousand acres.

The basis for the continued existence of the Nova Sich as a territory was signed in 1734, the Lubny Treaty on the recognition of the Russian protectorate by the Cossacks.

To oversee the actions of the Cossacks, the imperial government built a fortification 2 km from the Nova Sich with two half-bastions and a permanent garrison - the so-called Nova Sich retransmission.

According to historians, the Nova Sich retrenchment was erected in the Sich by the imperial government for the ostentatious purpose of helping the Cossacks in their war with the Ottomans, but in reality, for the hidden purpose of keeping them in their hands. However, the Cossacks well understood the reason for the construction of the Russian citadel, expressing their dissatisfaction with the words: "We have a Moscow sore liver." Given the historical events that took place during the existence of the Nova Sich, we must recognize that the imperial government achieved its goal by dissuading the Sich from participating in the nationwide struggle against deprivation.

== Location and components of the Sich ==
On three sides, Sich was surrounded by Pidpilna, a tributary of the Dnieper River, which sailed Zaporozhian chaiky and Turkish and Greek merchant ships (tumbasy), which sailed to the Sich harbor in the river bay Ustup (Ukrainian: Уступ під Білою Косою). On the north-eastern side of the underground separated branch – the river Sysyna, flows into the Dnieper.

The sich was a city – a fortress surrounded by a rampart and palisades. The Pidpilnenska Sich consisted of three parts: the suburbs, or the so-called shop bazaar, where all tents and visitors had their shops and taverns for trade, where there were houses of market atamans and military canary or keeper of scales. This suburb was called Hassan-Basha. From it began the gate that led to the kish – the main fortification, where around the Sich Square were located 38 huts. The huts were spacious barracks. Between the huts of the Ustup Bay and the Pidpilna River is the Inner Kish or Palanka, separated by a wall from the Outer Kish. Palanka housed the houses of the Kish Otaman and Sich officers, as well as the Sich Cathedral Church of the Intercession of the Mother of God, the military chancellery, the treasury, and the houses of the clergy.

To the west of the Kish were fortifications of the Nova Sich retrenchment built by the tsarist government to control Sich. There was a Russian commandant with a garrison of land militia regiments.

== History ==
During the existence of the Nova Sich, an independent Cossack-military group called the Haidamaky emerged. The Haydamatsky movement began in 1734 with the inaction of the first Nova Sich Otaman-Hetman I.Malashevych in the protection of the rights and freedoms of the Ukrainian people, when in 1734–1738 large detachments of insurgents led by G. Goly, M. Golim, M. Mane, S. Chalym and others.

According to the 1756 Zaporozhian Sich register, only about 30,000 people, 12,758 of whom were Cossack, lived across the Nova Sich territories, a low figure due to frequent raids by Crimean Tatars

An epidemic broke out in the Sich in 1760, and entry and exit from the Sich were banned.

In 1768 a Cossack revolt (known as the "Gray revolt") broke out, during which the kish otaman Petro Kalnyshevskyi and the Cossack sergeant hid in the Nova Sich retrenchment. The rebels tried to choose Philip Fedoriv but were quickly dispersed.

The Zaporozhian Army left the Nova Sich for the Russo-Turkish War of 1735–1739 and the War of 1768–1774.

== Destruction ==
In early June 1775, by order of Catherine II, the Nova Sich was destroyed, and the liberty of the Zaporozhian Army was annulled. After the end of the Russo-Turkish War (1768-1774), in which the Zaporozhian Cossacks took an active part, Lieutenant General Peter Tekeli led 10 infantry, 13 Russian Cossack, 8 cavalry regular regiments, 20 hussars, and 17 Picker squadrons to the Sich. Despite the small number, the Cossacks appealed to the Kish otaman Petro Kalnyshevskyi for permission to defend himself to death. However, wealthy officers advised Koshov to give in without any conditions; in addition, the priest of the Sich Church of the Intercession, Volodymyr Sokalsky, began to ask that they avoid fratricide. In the end, the Kish otaman surrendered Sich without a fight. On June 4, 1775, the Nova (Pidpilnenska) Sich ceased to exist.

On the site of the Sich, the village of Pokrovske later appeared, which in the 1950s was submerged under the waters of the artificial Kakhovka Reservoir. The reservoir was drained following the destruction of the Kakhovka Dam in 2023.

== Sources ==
- В. В. Панашенко. Нова Січ // Енциклопедія історії України : у 10 т. / редкол.: В. А. Смолій (голова) та ін. ; Інститут історії України НАН України. — К. : Наукова думка, 2010. — Т. 7 : Мл — О. — С. 437. — 728 с. : іл. — ISBN 978-966-00-1061-1
