= Dmytro Vyshnevetsky =

Grand Duchy of Lithuania nobleman

- Дмитро Вишневецький
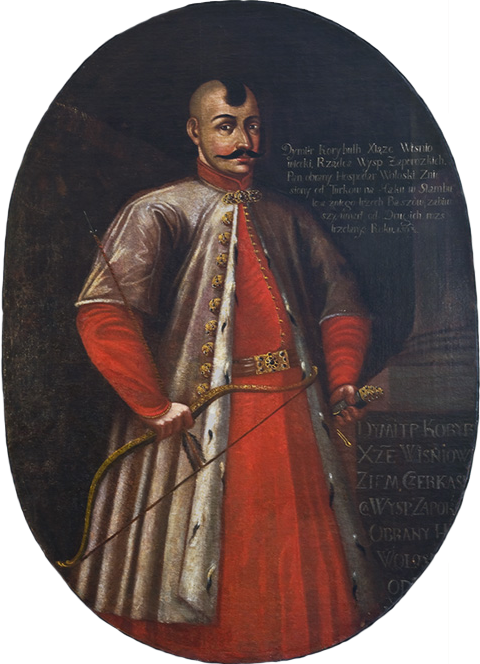
- Portrait of Vyshnevetsky, 18th century
- Born: Vyshnivets, Volhynia, Grand Duchy of Lithuania
- Died: 1563; Istanbul, Ottoman Empire
- Cause of death: Torture
- Other name: Байда (Baida)
- Title: Starosta of Cherkasy and Kaniv; Prince of Belyov
- Father: Ivan Wiśniowiecki
- Relatives: Andrzej Wiśniowiecki (brother); Zygmunt Wiśniowiecki (brother); Konstanty Korybut-Wiśniowiecki (brother); Konstanty Wiśniowiecki (nephew)
- Family: Wiśniowiecki (Vyshnevetsky)

Dmytro Ivanovych Vyshnevetsky (Ukrainian: Дмитро Іванович Вишневе́цький; Russian: Дмитрий Иванович Вишневе́цкий; Polish: Dymitr Wiśniowiecki) was a Ruthenian magnate of the Polish–Lithuanian Commonwealth. He established the Khortytsia Castle as a stronghold on the Small Khortytsia Island. He was also known as Baida (Байда, Polish: Bajda) in Ukrainian folk songs.

== Biography ==
Dmytro Vyshnevetsky was born into the powerful family of Ruthenian magnate Ivan Wiśniowiecki (?-1542) (part of Gediminids bloodline and the youngest son of Michał Zbaraski) and Nastazja Olizarowicz (?-1536), daughter of Semen Olizarowicz.

At first Dmytro Vyshnevetsky lived in the town of Vyshnivets of the Kremenets Powiat (county). In 1550–1553, Vyshnevetsky became a starosta of the Cherkasy and the Kaniv Powiats. Vyshnevetsky has been called the first Cossack Hetman, although he is not mentioned with this title in the 16th-century sources.

Dmytro Baida Vyshnevetsky was an able leader, although somewhat of a reckless adventurer. He started organizing a Cossack army in 1550 against the Crimean Khanate. Displeased with the king Sigismund II Augustus's policy of Catholization and centralization of power, he was ready to go over to the Turks. However, he was appointed to fortify the island of Mala Khortytsia on the Dnipro beyond the rapids. According to Hrushevsky, Vyshnevetsky built the fortress out of his own pocket as both Sigismund II Augustus and Devlet I Giray refused to provide any assistance. Eventually he managed to develop it to the point that khan Devlet I Giray could not take it, and he deflected the khan's efforts to Russia.

In 1556 in service to Ivan the Terrible he helped lead two raids of Ukrainian Cossacks and Russians against the Crimean Tatars around Ochakiv. In 1558 he raided around Perekop. In 1559 he raided down the Donets and Don. With the start of the Livonian War, Ivan turned his attention west and Vyshnevetsky, returned to the Lithuanian service with a great number of his Adyghe warriors. His Pyatigorsky detachments became the major military force of the Polish-Lithuanian Commonwealth in centuries to come. In 1561, at the request of the Lithuanian prince, he went back to fortifying Khortytsia.

In 1563 he was involved in Moldavian affairs, perhaps hoping to obtain the throne of Moldavia, but was defeated by the forces of Ștefan Tomșa I, taken prisoner and sent to the Turks, and finally tortured to death in Constantinople.

Vyshnevetsky's fortifications on Khortytsia, which some historians since the 18th century have retroactively been calling a sich, might have served as a prototype for later fortifications of the Zaporizhian Sich.

== In popular culture ==
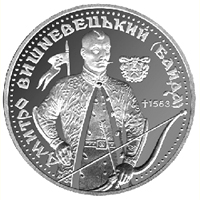
Commemorative Ukrainian hryvnia coin depicting Vyshnevetsky, 1999

He appears as an antagonist in The Ringed Castle, a 1971 novel by Dorothy Dunnett.

In the film Propala Hramota (The lost letter, 1972), a fragment of the famous old Ukrainian folk song about Baida was sung by Ivan Mykolaychuk:

Ой як стрілив - царя вцілив,
А царицю в потилицю...

12th Operational Brigade of the National Guard of Ukraine was given his Honorary name to honour his legacy.

== See also ==
- Hetman of Zaporizhian Cossacks

== Bibliography ==
- Dmytro Doroshenko (1975). A Survey of Ukrainian History. Winnipeg: Humeniuk Publication Foundation (Canada).
- Haidai, L. (2000). Istoria Ukrainy v osobakh, terminakh, nazvakh i poniattiakh. Lutsk: Vezha.
- Dovidnyk z istorii Ukrainy (1st ed.). 1993. Archived from the original on December 20, 2005.
- Wolff, Józef (1895). "Kniaziowie litewsko-ruscy od końca czternastego wieku" [Lithuanian-Ruthenian knyazes from the end of the fourteenth century]. Biblioteka Instytutu Historii Uam (in Polish). Warsaw.
