= Khortytsia Castle =

Khortytsia Castle (Note: Ukrainian: Хортицький замок, romanized: Khortycjkyj zamok (DSTU 9112:2021; 2022) or Khortytskyi zamok (Ukrainian National transliteration; 2019).) was a fortification (castle) built in the mid-1550s by Prince Dmytro Vyshnevetsky. In October 1557, the castle was destroyed by Crimean Tatar forces.

Since the 18th century, some historians interpret this fortification as the first Zaporizhian Sich, (Note: Polish historians Tygielski & Kopczynski (2017): "From the construction of the first Sich on the island of Khortytsia, on the Dnieper, by the forces of Prince Dmytro Vyshnevetsky, to the time of Stefan Batory's reign, the number of Cossacks grew steadily.") the so-called "Khortytsia Sich", but most domestic historians reject this interpretation, which is not confirmed by sources. (Note: Encyclopedia of History of Ukraine (Volume 10, 2013): "Since the 18th century, the idea has been widespread in historiography that Kh[ortytsia] is the site of one of the first Sichs — the so-called Khortytsjka Sich. However, neither written sources nor archaeological data provide grounds for such a statement.") In any case, despite its short existence, Khortytsia Castle played a significant role in the development of the Ukrainian Cossacks, or at least in the popular imagination of that process.

== Location ==
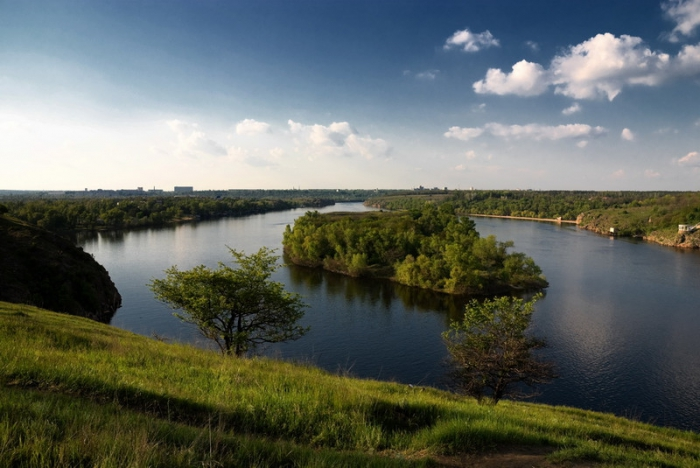
"Baida Island" (pictured in 2012), one of the two most popular candidates for the "Little Khortytsia Island" mentioned in historical sources. It was called "Kantserivsky Island" until the late 20th century, when it was renamed after Vyshnevetsky's nickname "Baida" in favour of this identification.

The exact location of this castle is uncertain. The only known written sources clearly indicating the location of the castle's construction are the 16th-century Kronika Polska of Joachim Bielski and his father Marcin Bielski, which mention the island of Little (Mala) Khortytsia on the Lower Dnipro. In Freedom of the Zaporizhzhian Cossacks (1890, 1918), Dmytro Yavornytsky quoted the Kronika polska Marcina Bielskiego as saying:

There is another island near that Kozanky, called Khorchyka, where Vyshnevetsky lived before and caused great harm to the Tatars, so that they did not dare to invade us so often because of him." (Note: Polish: A miezdy innemi iest tam ostrow ieden ktory zowią Kochanie, miedzy Porohy, czterdzieści mil od Kiiowa, iest go na kilka mil wzdłuż, na ktorym gdy czuią Kozaki Tatarowie nie tak łatwie do nas sie przeprawiaią, bo z niego Krzemienieckiego y Kusmańskiego tych dwu brodu (ktorymi sie oni pospolicie do nas przeprawuią) może im zabronić. Jest y drugi ostrow blisko takow ktory zowią Chorczyka, na ktorym Wiśniowiecki przedtym mieszkał, y Tatarom na wielkiey przeszkodzie był, że nieśmieli za niego tak często do nas wtargać: niżey niego trochę Tyśmienica rzeka wpada w Niepr, 44 mil od Kiiowa., lit. 'Among other things, there is an island there called Kochanie, situated between the Rapids, forty miles from Kyiv, it stretches for several miles; when the Cossacks and Tatars sense its presence, they do not cross over to us so easily, for from it one can block the two fords at Krzemieniecki and Kusmański (which they commonly use to cross over to us). There is also another island nearby, called Chorczyka, on which Wiśniowiecki once lived, and which was a great obstacle to the Tatars, so that they did not dare to invade us so often because of it: a little downstream from it, the Tyśmienica River flows into the Dnipro, 44 miles from Kyiv.' Ukrainian: Є й ще один острів біля того Коханого, називаний Хорчика, що на нім Вишневецький перед цим жив і вельми татарам шкодив, так що вони не сміли через нього так часто до нас вторгатися, romanized: There is another island near that Kozanky, called Khorchyka, where Vyshnevetsky lived before and caused great harm to the Tatars, so that they did not dare to invade us so often because of him.. Russian: Есть и другой остров вблизи того — Любимого — называемый Хорчик, на котором Вишневецкий до того жил и татарам очень вредил, так что они из-за него не смели так часто врываться к нам., romanized: There is another island near it — Lyubimoye — called Khorchik, where Vishnevetsky used to live and caused great harm to the Tatars, so that they did not dare to invade us so often because of him.)

Kantserivsky Island, the most popular candidate to be identified with "Little Khortytsia", was renamed "Baida Island" in the second half of the 20th century in honour of Vyshnevetsky (nicknamed "Baida"). The second-most popular candidate for "Little Khortytsia" is a tract of Steppe near the Kichkas crossing (now flooded by the Dnieper Reservoir). The advantage of the first version is that it is based on archaeological materials; on the other hand, supporters of the second version point out that the topographic position of Baida Island does not correspond to the task that was assigned to the "castle" of Prince Vyshnevetsky: to control the Dnipro.

== History ==
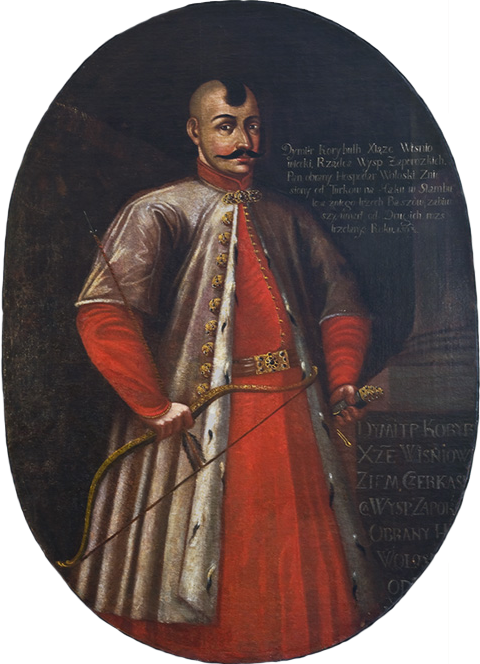
Dmytro Vyshnevetsky. Anonymous 18th-century painting.

As early as the first decades of the 16th century, border elders and Cossack leaders proposed (but to no avail) to the officials of the Lithuanian state to establish a fortress on the Lower Dnipro, which would prevent Crimean Tatar attacks on Ukraine. At the same time, the Lithuanian grand ducal authorities had received demands from the Crimean Khan to stop Cossack raids along the Dnipro into the Black Sea affecting the Crimean Khanate as early as 1492, the first time the word "Cossacks" is mentioned in surviving written sources. In the context of this mutual raiding and counter-raiding, the Lithuanian borderland officials were trying to use the Cossacks to defend the frontier against Crimean Tatar raids, while also trying to stop the Cossack raids from bothering the Crimean Khanate. In 1553 (or 1554), the Grand Duke of Lithuania Sigismund II Augustus sent Prince Dmytro Vyshnevetsky, starosta (captain) of Kaniv and Cherkasy, beyond the Dnipro rapids to build a small fortress that was supposed to stop Cossack expeditions attempting to conduct raids downstream. Paradoxically, he used his Cossack servants to build this fortress. Construction reportledly began in 1555.

In 1556, Vyshnevetsky's garrison reportedly repelled two Turkish attacks on the castle. That same year, he sent two ambassadors to Moscow to discuss an anti-Ottoman coalition.

He led successful campaigns against Ottoman fortresses in the lower Dnipro region: İslâm-Kermen (from where the captured cannons were transported to Khortytsia), Tiahyn, and Ochakiv. In response, in January 1557, the Crimean Khan Devlet I Giray and his horde unsuccessfully attempted to capture Khortytsia Castle for 24 days and kept it under siege for 24 days. He later recounted: "The tsar of Crimea, with all the people of Crimea, laid siege to my city on Khortytsia Island and besieged it for 24 days. By God's mercy… I repelled the attack and routed many of the tsar's finest men, and the tsar withdrew from me in great disgrace."

In October 1557, the Crimean Khan, together with Crimean Tatar, Nogai, Ottoman and Moldavian troops, laid siege to Little Khortytsia again. The Sultan's galleys came to a halt right by the island. Vyshnevetsky and the Cossacks were forced to withstand a fierce siege. However, the forces were unequal, and their supplies had run out. The Cossacks began to scatter, so they were forced to retreat. The prince reported to Ivan the Terrible that 'he had left the Dnipro and Khortytsia Island because provisions had run out and the Cossacks had dispersed'. Vyshnevetsky withdrew to Monastyrskyi Island.

The following year, having defected to Ivan the Terrible of Moscow, Vyshnevetsky participated in anti-Ottoman campaigns against Azov, the Lower Don, and near Kerch. However, when Ivan the Terrible launched the Livonian War against the Baltic states (1558–1583), virtually all Muscovite troops were pulled out of Ukraine and the Northern Caucasus, leaving Vyshnevetsky on his own. In April 1562, he visited Moscow to plead with Ivan to continue campaigning against the Ottomans, but Ivan rejected his request. Disillusioned, Vyshnevetsky returned to the service of Sigismund Augustus of Lithuania and Poland, falling captive during a 1563 campaign against Ottoman Moldavia and being executed there.

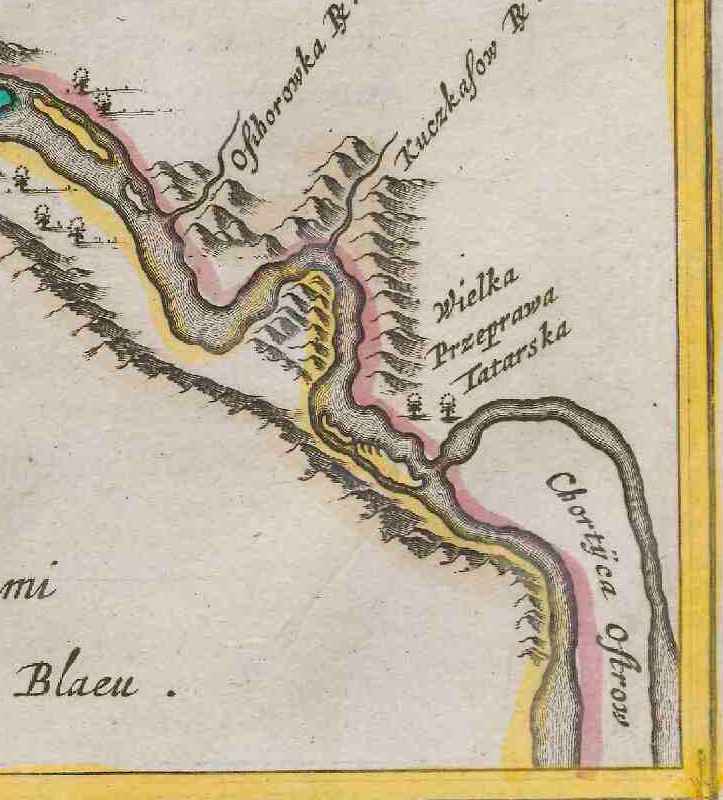
"Chortyca Ostrow" (Khortytsia Island) in the Atlas Maior (1664) of Joan Blaeu, originally drawn by Beauplan.

In his 1660 Description of Ukraine, Beauplan wrote:

Half a league lower is the head of Chortizca [Khortytsia], but I having gone no further on that side, shall only tell you what I learned by information from others, and therefore I do not deliver it as undeniable. They say that island is considerable because of its great height, and being almost hemmed in with precipices, therefore not very accessible. It is two leagues in length, and half a league in breadth, especially towards the upper end, for it grows narrower and lower towards the West: it is not subject to floods, has abundance of oaks, and would be a very good place to build a town, which would be as it were a watchtower over the Tartars. Below this island the river [Dnipro] grows very wide.

— Guillaume Le Vasseur de Beauplan, Description of Ukraine (1660; adapted from the 1704 English translation).

== Question of the first Sich ==
See also: History of Khortytsia#Vyshnevetsky's castle and the "Sich on Khortytsia".

=== Semantics ===
The very meaning and application of the term sich is contested amongst scholars. The first time a sich is unambiguously identified as a fortified settlement of independently living and self-governing Zaporizhian Cossacks who elect their own leaders in Cossack Radas, is the Chortomlyk Sich in 1672. Any earlier mentions of the word sich or a similar situation without the word sich (a so-called "proto-sich") is subject to scholarly discussion. For example, Erich Lassota von Steblau used the German word Feldläger ("military camp", or "settlement of nomads") in his diary, which only later Ukrainian and Russian editions have translated as "sich" (січ, сечь).

To date, no direct evidence has been found in the sources to identify Dmytro Vyshnevetskyi's Khortytsia Castle with the first Zaporizhian Sich, although some researchers claim that there were allegedly Sich fortifications on Khortytsia. However, to be precise, documentary sources record that in the mid-1550s there was not a 'sich' here, but rather a 'town' or 'castle'. It is also hypothesised that 'it was here that the Cossacks gathered' before setting out on their campaigns and upon their return. Nevertheless, as shown by the research of Sh. Lemérès-Kelkège, based on Ottoman archives, even 'Cossacks' are scarcely mentioned in Vyshnevetsky's army, apart from a brief episode of military action near Azov, let alone 'Sich Cossacks' (a phrase not documented until 1585). Instead, 'Dmytrashka's' warriors are most often referred to as 'Rus' or 'infidels'. Although the same sources, on other occasions, repeatedly mention 'Polish', 'Muscovite' and 'Rus' 'Cossacks'.

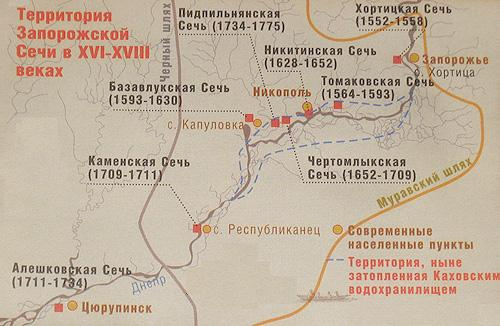
In the upper-right corner of this 2007 Russian-language map, a "Khortytsia Sich" (Хортицкая Сечь) is identified as having existed from 1552 to 1558.

Furthermore, the sources currently known from the mid-1550s not only fail to mention the 'Sich' explicitly, but also make no mention of a 'kish' on Khortytsia, nor of kish otamans, nor of the traditions of their democratic election. Instead, Dmytro Vyshnevetsky is described in the documents as a sole ruler, rather than a leader elected by the Sich Cossacks. Moreover, the Polish king Sigismund II Augustus himself, in one of his letters to Vyshnevetsky (which Dmytro Yavornytsky dated to the spring–summer of 1557) emphasised the anti-Cossack nature of the castle that had been built: 'To keep out wicked people—troublemakers… preventing the Cossacks from harassing the shepherds and harming the ulus of the Turkish sultan.'

Tetyana Kuzyk (2013, last updated 2021) outlined the main four positions:

- "Some researchers (Yu. Mytsyk, V. Serhiychuk, H. Shvydko, N. Yakovenko) call the first Zaporizhian Sich the Khortytsia castle of Prince D. Vyshnevetsky;"
- "Others, the Sich on Tomakivka Island (A. Hurbyk, G. Serhiyenko, V. Shcherbak);"
- "However, some consider the Tomakivka Sich and Bazavluk Sich to be a historiographic myth, claiming that until the 2nd half of the 17th century there were exclusively "sichs" - fortified camps where the Cossacks were concentrated situationally (D. Vyrsky);"
- "or recognises only three Zaporizhian Sichs as "proto-state formations": Bazavluk, Chortomlyk and Pidpilnenska (Nova Sich; I. Storozhenko)."

=== Inhabitants and traces ===
According to tradition, Vyshnevetsky built a fortress on the island of Mala (Little) Khortytsia, (Note: According to the results of archaeological and hydroarchaeological research conducted in the 1990s and 2000s, the island of Mala Khortytsia might possibly be identified with the island of Baida, located near Khortytsia.) that constantly housed a garrison of 300 soldiers. The garrison of Khortytsia Castle consisted of Cossacks, boyars, servants, and other military personnel.

The castle on Little Khortytsia, having stood for about a year, left no trace whatsoever, whilst the very first Sich on Tomakivka island was mentioned almost two decades later (although it might have been established as early as 1540). Nevertheless, in folk tradition, Vyshnevetsky became a popular hero as the first Cossack "hetman", a title normally reserved for the supreme commander of the Polish army.

From the outside, the Vyshnevetsky fortress must have differed from the architectural complexes that later became famous—the Cossack strongholds on the Dnieper. In addition to the Cossacks, the garrison included members of the military establishment—boyars, servants and foot soldiers. At the same time, living as a single community in the specific conditions of the southern borderlands contributed to the emergence of a distinctive military-political organisation within the Zaporizhian community, and its model. As M. F. Vladimyrskyi-Budanov observed, the Khortytsia Fortress became a stronghold of "the grassroots freedom-seekers, who later served as the seed of the future Sich." The assertion by Mykhailo Hrushevsky also seems plausible: in an article dedicated to the historical achievements of Dmytro Vyshnevetsky, he referred to the prince as "the spiritual father of the cradle of the new Ukrainian plebeian republic". Liubomyr Vynar considers the castle on Khortytsia Island to be "the first prototype of the Cossack Sich, where the military and economic life of the Zaporizhian Cossacks developed." This suggests that Khortytsia Castle became a kind of prototype for the Cossack fortification which, having established itself on Tomakivka Island in the 1560s and 1570s, came to be known as the Zaporizhian Sich.

Despite its relatively short existence (1556–1557), the Khortytsia Fortress had a significant influence on the evolution of the Ukrainian Cossacks and the growth of their ranks. In a letter to the Cossacks dated 20 November 1568, Sigismund II Augustus addressed them for the first time as a distinct group of the Ukrainian population, stating: "From our castles and settlements in Ukraine, without our permission or the knowledge of our governors and local officials in Ukraine, having gathered downstream on the Dnipro, in the fields and at other entry points, you are causing disturbances: We are aware that you, living lawlessly in border areas and at various entry points, encounter subjects of the Turkish sultan, shepherds and Tatars of the sultan of Perekop, and, finding yourselves in their uluses and encampments, are causing them great harm and plunder, and thereby exposing the borders of our estates to danger from the enemy."

== Bibliography ==
=== Primary sources ===
- Bielski, Marcin; Bielski, Joachim (1597). Kronika polska Marcina Bielskiego nowo wydana (in Polish). Vol. 8.

=== Literature ===
- Mytsyk, Yuri Andriyovych (2003). "Вишневецький Дмитро Iванович" [Dmytro Ivanovych Vyshnevetsky]. Encyclopedia of History of Ukraine (in Ukrainian). Vol. 1. Kyiv: Institute of History of Ukraine. Archived from the original on 21 June 2026.
- Mytsyk, Yuri Andriyovych (2013). "Хортиця" [Khortycja]. Encyclopedia of History of Ukraine (in Ukrainian). Vol. 10. Kyiv: Institute of History of Ukraine. Archived from the original on 21 June 2026.
- Kuzyk, Tetyana Leonidivna (2013). "Січ, як термін" [Sich, as a term]. Encyclopedia of History of Ukraine (in Ukrainian). Vol. 9. Kyiv: Institute of History of Ukraine. Archived from the original on 21 June 2026. (last updated 2021)
- Plokhy, Serhii (2022). The Gates of Europe: A History of Ukraine. New York, NY: Basic Books. p. 414. ISBN 978-0-465-07394-8.
- Tygielski, Wojciech; Kopczynski, Michał (2017). Under a Common Sky. The Nations of the Commonwealth of Poland and Lithuania. New York – Warsaw: PIASA Books, Polish History Museum. p. 271.
- Yavornytsky, Dmytro Ivanovych (2005). Твори у 20 томах. Том 2 [Works in 20 Volumes. Volume 2.] (PDF) (in Ukrainian). Kyiv/Zaporizhzhia: Tandem-U. p. 384. ISBN 966-7482-48-0.
- "Генеза та шляхи розвитку запорозького козацтва" [The genesis and development of the Zaporizhian Cossacks] (in Ukrainian). Archived from the original on 7 January 2009.
