= Sich Rada =

Government of the Zaporozhian Cossacks

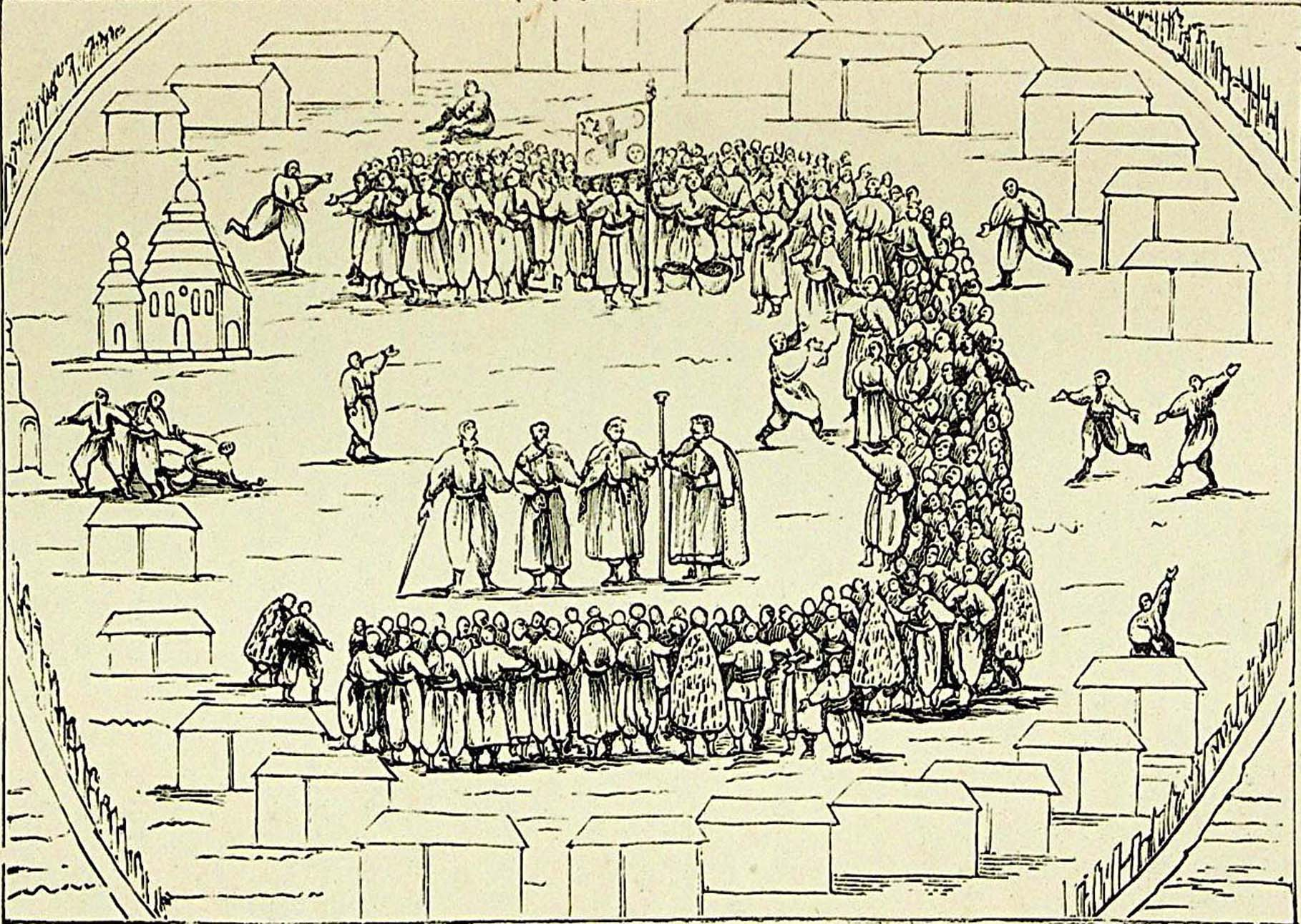
A depiction of a Sich Rada from Dmytro Yavornytsky's Zaporozhye in the Remnants of Antiquity and the Legends of the People (1888)

The Sich Rada (Ukrainian: Січова Рада, romanized: Sichova Rada) also called the Military Council, and the Viyskova Rada (Ukrainian: Військова Рада ('Host Council')) was the highest branch of government of the Zaporozhian Cossacks.

== Description ==
The Sich Rada was a form of governing committee, and the highest branch of government of the Zaporozhian Cossacks.

The Rada met irregularly on the central square of the Zaporozhian Sich; during the 18th century it met twice a year. Measures were adopted by a majority vote, which was estimated visually with no exact count of hands. The members of the Sich Rada all had an equal vote.

== Composition and powers ==
Whereas at various times the Sich elected its own hetmans, by the second half of the 17th century the title of kish otaman had replaced that of the hetman as the highest office in the Zaporozhian Sich. Elected to a one-year term, though subject to removal by the Sich Council at any time, the otaman was the representative of the Zaporozhian Sich to the outside world.

The Sich Rada was a form of direct democracy, where the rights of individual Cossacks were enforced. It was involved in legislative, executive and judicial decisions. It was able to decide when to go to war and when to conclude a peace treaty. It elected the officer staff (starshyna), with the otaman at its head. It received foreign diplomats and determined the course of diplomatic relations. It fulfilled economic functions, such as the distribution of the communal agricultural and fishing districts among the kurins of the Sich. It was frequently unwieldy and gradually gave way to the decisions set by the Council of Elders.

== Sources ==
- "Запорожская Сечь" . Brockhaus and Efron Encyclopedic Dictionary (in Russian). 1906.
- Magocsi, Paul R. (1996). A History of Ukraine. University of Toronto Press. ISBN 978-0-8020-7820-9.
