= Józef Wolff =

Polish historian (1852–1900)

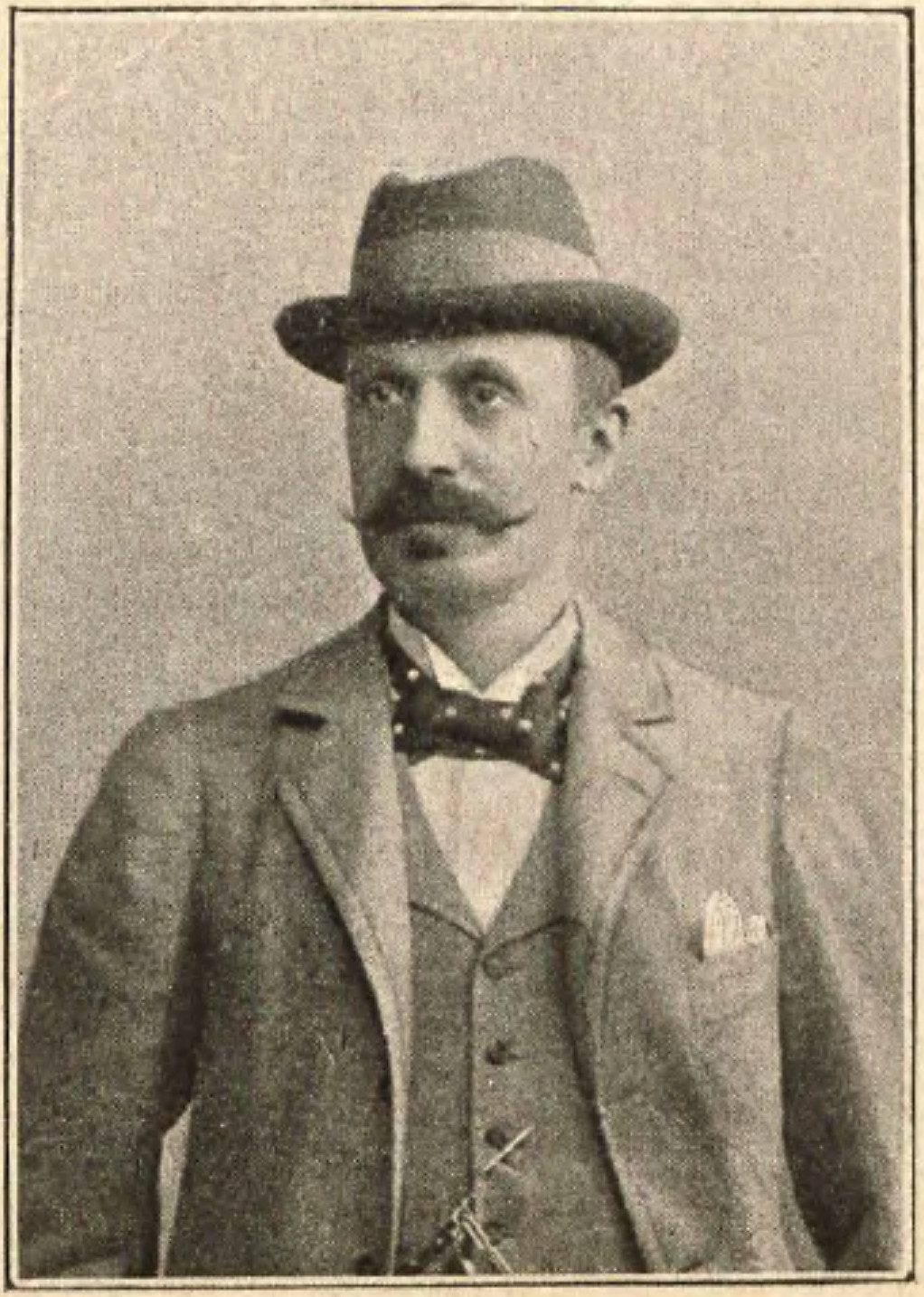
Józef Ludwik Wolff

Józef Ludwik Wolff (born December 15, 1852, in Warsaw, died August 9, 1900, in Heidelberg) was a Polish historian, bookseller, heraldist and genealogist.

== Biography ==
He was born into the family of a merchant and banker of Jewish origin, Ludwik Wolff and Józefina née Zdzieniecka. After graduating from high schools in Poland, he studied economic sciences in Leipzig. He then worked at the Commercial Bank in Warsaw as an authorized representative. Later he moved to St. Petersburg, where, in addition to his bookselling activities, he conducted source research on the Lithuanian Metrica. He was a correspondent member of the Academy of Arts and Sciences in Kraków. He left behind several significant prosopographical studies. Some of them, although published under his name, were in fact authored by Konstanty Ożarowski. Of Wolff's unpublished legacy, we should mention the manuscript of his four-volume work Herbarz szlachty litewskiej, which burned down along with his book collection of 2,100 items at the Krasiński Library in Warsaw in 1944. He is buried in the Powązki cemetery (quarters 156-2-16/17).

On November 27, 1875, he married his cousin, the daughter of his uncle Bolesław Maurycy Wolff, Zofia Leonia Wolff. With her he had a daughter Maria Helena, born on February 20, 1880.

== List of works ==
- O kniaziach Kobryńskich, Kraków 1883.
- Pacowie. Materyjały historyczno-genealogiczne, Petersburg 1885.
- Senatorowie i dygnitarze Wielkiego Księstwa Litewskiego 1386–1795, Kraków 1885.
- Żyd ministrem króla Zygmunta. Szkic historyczny, Kraków 1885 (Tel-Awiw 1988).
- Ród Gedimina. Dodatki i poprawki do dzieł K. Stadnickiego: „Synowie Gedymina”, „Olgierd i Kiejstut” i „Bracia Władysława Jagiełły”, Kraków 1886.
- Kniaziowie litewsko-ruscy od końca czternastego wieku, Warszawa 1895 (Warszawa 1994).
