= Petro Kalnyshevsky =

Ukrainian Cossack leader (1690–1803)

- Петро Калнишевський

Kish Otaman
- In office 1 January 1765 – 4 June 1775
- Hetman: Office vacant
- Preceded by: Pylyp Fedoriv
- Succeeded by: Position abolished
- In office 9 September 1762 – October 1763
- Hetman: Kirill Razumovsky
- Preceded by: Hryhorii Lantukh
- Succeeded by: Hryhorii Lantukh

Personal details
- Born: 20 June 1690 (Note: Kalnyshevsky's birth date and place are disputed; see § Early life and career for further details.) Pustoviitivka, Cossack Hetmanate (now Ukraine)
- Died: 31 October 1803 (aged 113) Solovetsky Monastery, Russian Empire (now in Arkhangelsk Oblast, Russia)

Military service
- Allegiance: Zaporozhian Sich; Russian Empire
- Rank: Osavul
- Unit: Lubny Regiment
- Battles/wars: Haydamak uprisings; Russo-Turkish War (1768–1774)

Saint Peter the Long-Suffering
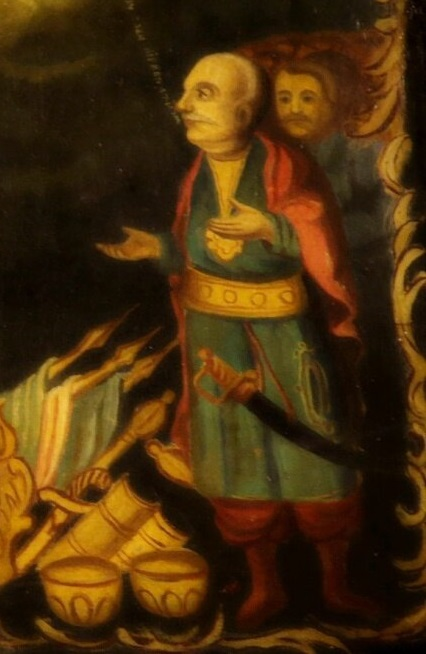

Righteous
- Venerated in: Orthodox Church of Ukraine
- Canonized: 2008; 18 years ago by Ukrainian Orthodox Church - Kyiv Patriarchate
- Feast: 14 October, 13 November

Petro Ivanovych Kalnyshevsky (Old Ukrainian: Петр(ъ) (Петро) Калнишевский, Калнишенко; Ukrainian: Петро Іванович Калнишевський; 20 June 1690 – 31 October 1803) was a Ukrainian Cossack leader who served as the final Kish otaman of the Zaporozhian Sich, holding the office from 1765 to 1775. He had previously briefly served as kish otaman in 1762. Kalnyshevsky's role as the final leader of the Zaporozhian Sich before its liquidation and annexation into the Russian Empire, as well as his subsequent arrest by the Russian government and deportation to the Solovetsky Islands, has made him a popular figure in Ukrainian literature and consciousness.

Most scholars accept that Kalnyshevsky was born in the village of Pustoviitivka in 1690, although this is disputed. He rapidly ascended from the rank of osavul with the support of high-ranking older relatives during the 1750s and led a Russian-backed crackdown on haydamak peasant rebels, overseeing mass executions. By 1761 he had become the de facto ruler of Ukraine's Zaporozhia. He was appointed as kish otaman for the first time in 1762, but was soon removed from office by Empress Catherine the Great. He returned to office with the support of Russia and wealthy Cossacks in 1764, after two years of rule by leaders of the poor Cossacks had led to increased tensions between the Sich and its neighbours.

Kalnyshevsky oversaw unprecedented concentration of power into the hands of the kish otaman, abolishing the process of yearly elections which had previously governed the role. Relying on a combination of Russian and landowning interests to remain in office, he intensified the colonisation of the wild fields, as well as grain production, and attempted to prevent Russian territorial encroachment upon the Sich. After the Sich's liquidation, he was arrested and exiled to the Solovetsky Islands, remaining there until his death in 1803.

== Early life and career ==
According to Volodymyr Kuksa, a professor of history at Kyiv Polytechnic Institute, most Ukrainian researchers believe Kalnyshevsky's date of birth to be 20 June 1690. Historian Vladyslav Hrybovskyi has disputed this, however, saying that no birth record from this time has been found for Kalnyshevsky and he was likely born c. 1710–1715. Kalnyshevsky is often described as being from the village of Pustoviitivka, but this fact is also questioned by Hrybovskyi, who notes that in the 1930s village elders from Pustoviitivka were unaware of the otaman having been from there. Kalnyshevsky was first mentioned in 1754, as an osavul of the Lubny Regiment.

== Early military and political career ==
Kalnyshevsky's political career began with the patronage of the Kushchivka kurin, which his older relatives, Andrii and David, were both part of. Another relative by name of Zynovii, who was head of the Vedmedivka kurin and a representative of the Zaporozhian Sich's delegation to the Russian Empire, also may have played a role in Kalnyshevsky's rise through the ranks. Much of Kalnyshevsky's early career in politics was spent as a Zaporozhian diplomat in Saint Petersburg, where he was a member of a delegation negotiating trade relations with Russia. Kalnyshevsky would spend over a year in the city as part of the delegation.

=== Crackdown on Haydamaky ===
By 1754, the haydamak movement of militant peasants was spreading throughout Russia, the Polish–Lithuanian Commonwealth and the Ottoman Empire. The haydamaks worsened diplomatic tension that the Zaporozhian Host faced from its neighbours in spite of formal insistence that the movement was unconnected to the government. That year, Kalnyshevsky was placed in charge of a Russian-backed military unit intended to stop the movement. Kalnyshevsky's initial efforts failed to have much success; publications warning peasants not to join the haydamaks were ignored, and local officials connected to Kalnyshevsky were beaten. In response, Kalnyshevsky threatened to have peasants tried in Hlukhiv, where they faced the possibility exile in Russian Siberia, rather than adhering to Ukrainian legal traditions of the time.

By September 1754 Kalnyshevsky had received new orders, this time ordering him to the southern Hard region and in areas beyond the Dnieper river. This time, Kalnyshevsky cracked down harder, threatening executions even against those who had hid haydamak rebels from the government. He openly called on landowners to support him, exacerbating class divides that already existed between the peasantry and landowners. From 1756, Kalnyshevsky's activities shifted to the province of New Serbia, where haydamaks were particularly active. Towards the end of his campaign in New Serbia, Kalnyshevsky became engaged in a spat with New Serbia's leader, Jovan Horvat, who was indignant over Kalnyshevsky's forces lacking supplies and frequently engaging in executions. Kalnyshevsky returned to the Sich from New Serbia in December 1757.

== Leader of the Sich (1761–1763) ==
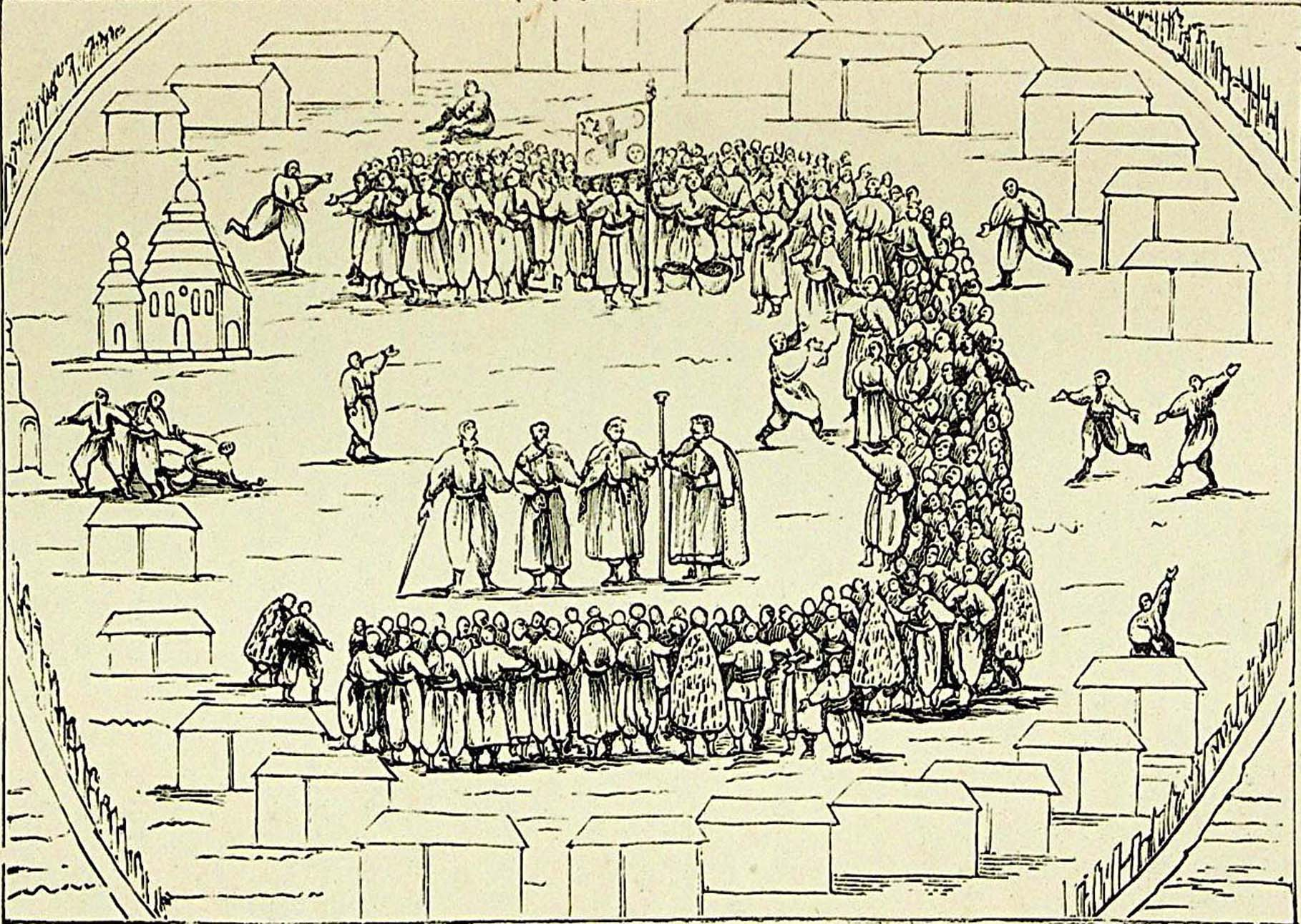
Depiction of an 18th-century Zaporozhian Sich rada (council) by Alexander Rigelman

By 1757, Kalnyshevsky was also a tax collector in the settlement of Samar, and during tax collection processes he took hostages and placed an armed blockade on the town, demanding the payment of taxes. This force was later ordered to retreat by Hetman Kirill Razumovsky, but Kalnyshevsky's rise continued; he was appointed as the kish judge the next year. Kalnyshevsky wielded substantial influence stretching far beyond his position and became the Hetmanate's de facto leader, taking most of the powers of de jure kish otaman Hryhorii Lantukh.

Kalnyshevsky first became kish otaman on 9 September 1762. His first major diplomatic engagement was the coronation of Russian Empress Catherine, during which he acquired attention from the monarch. Kalnyshevsky's independent personality brought Catherine's ire, and she began efforts to remove him from office. Shortly after his return from Russia, Kalnyshevsky was ordered by Governor of Kiev Ivan Glebov to crack down on the haydamaks on Zaporozhian territory. He was also issued orders to protect merchant convoys travelling along the Dnieper from pirates and send a contingent of Cossacks to the Fortress of St. Elizabeth to investigate Cossacks detained by the Russian government.

Kalnyshevsky's stint in office, however, would not last long; in October 1763 he was removed by the personal orders of Empress Catherine. He returned to his office as kish judge after his removal. He was succeeded by Lantukh, whom he himself had replaced a year prior, due to the influence of the Siroma class of impoverished Cossacks.

== Kish judge and return to office ==
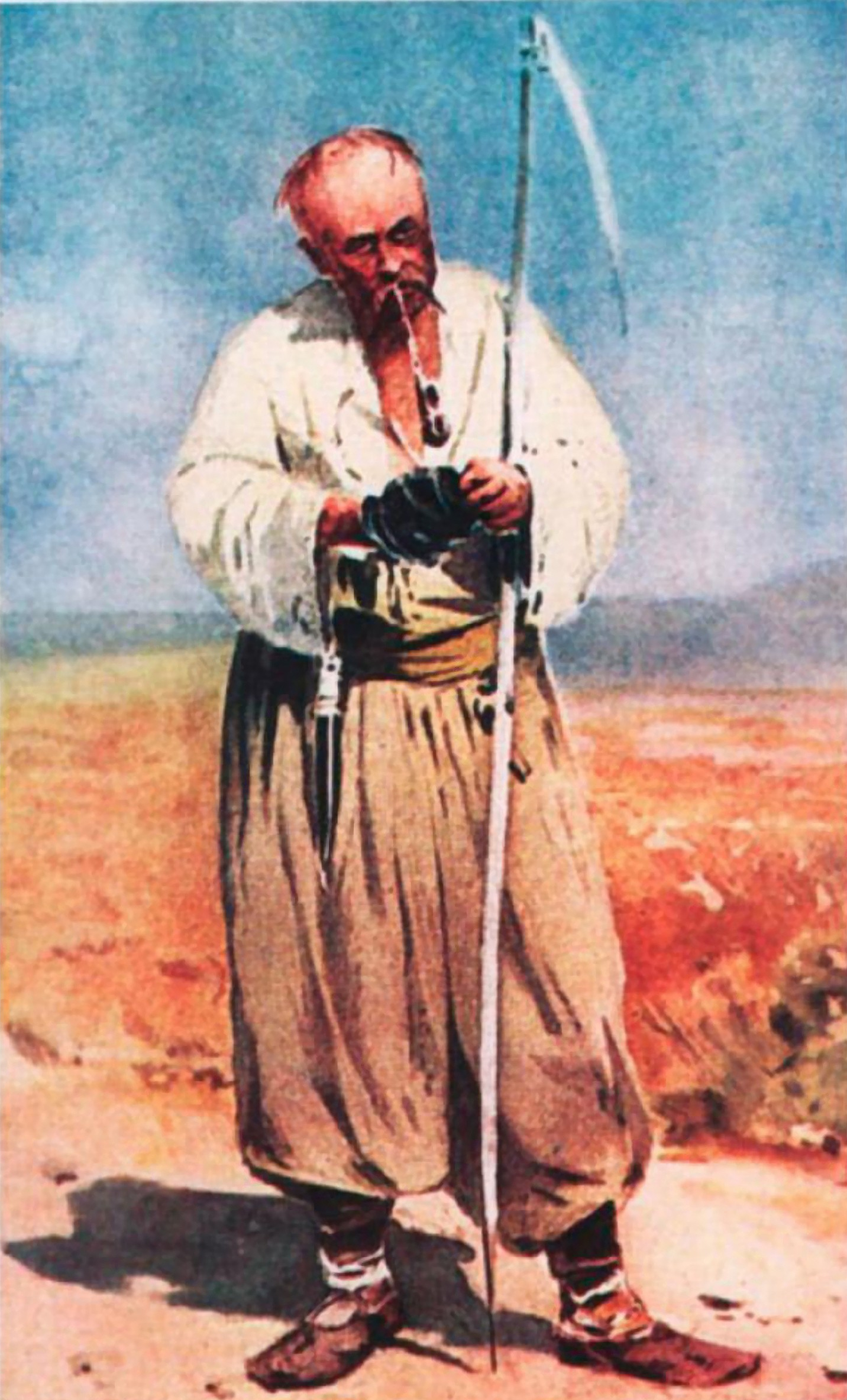
A poor Cossack (siromakha) by Serhii Vasylkivsky

With his removal from office, Kalnyshevsky focused on his role as kish judge. However, he soon found that Russia was seeking his return to office. Lantukh, as well as Lantukh's own successor Pylyp Fedoriv, had both been from the Siroma, and despite the level-headedness they had shown as kish otaman, their advanced ages made them unpopular. Furthermore, Russia was frustrated with the instability spreading throughout the Sich, including the increasing strength of the haydamaks, border disputes with the Ottomans, and increased agitation against the status quo by the Siroma. They sought to bring the wealthy Cossacks back into power, believing them to be more likely to support Russian political aims than the Siroma.

Kalnyshevsky obtained the support of the Russians as well as the Lubny Regiment. Further, the Ottomans and Poland–Lithuania both viewed him as capable of bringing stability to the Sich by ending the process of yearly elections. The haydamaks' spread beyond the borders of the Sich and their attacks on merchants and landowners from the Crimean Khanate and Poland–Lithuania caused alarm, and, to Russia's publicly-expressed distaste, unsuccessful attempts were made by the Siroma to keep Lantukh and Fedoriv from relenquishing the title of kish otaman.

Kalnyshevsky was defeated in the 1764 rada that brought Fedoriv to power, although Fedoriv had been against holding the role due to his own age (80 years) and the lack of organisation in the Sich. Despite placing continued requests to resign before the Siroma and the Russian government's Collegium of Little Russia, Fedoriv was refused the right to resign each time. Eventually, on 1 January 1765, Fedoriv's request was accepted, and he travelled to Saint Nicholas Monastery of Samar, where he became a monk. By this point, the Siroma had no figure with the authority to challenge Kalnyshevsky, and he returned to power as kish otaman on that day.

== Leader of the Sich (1765–1775) ==
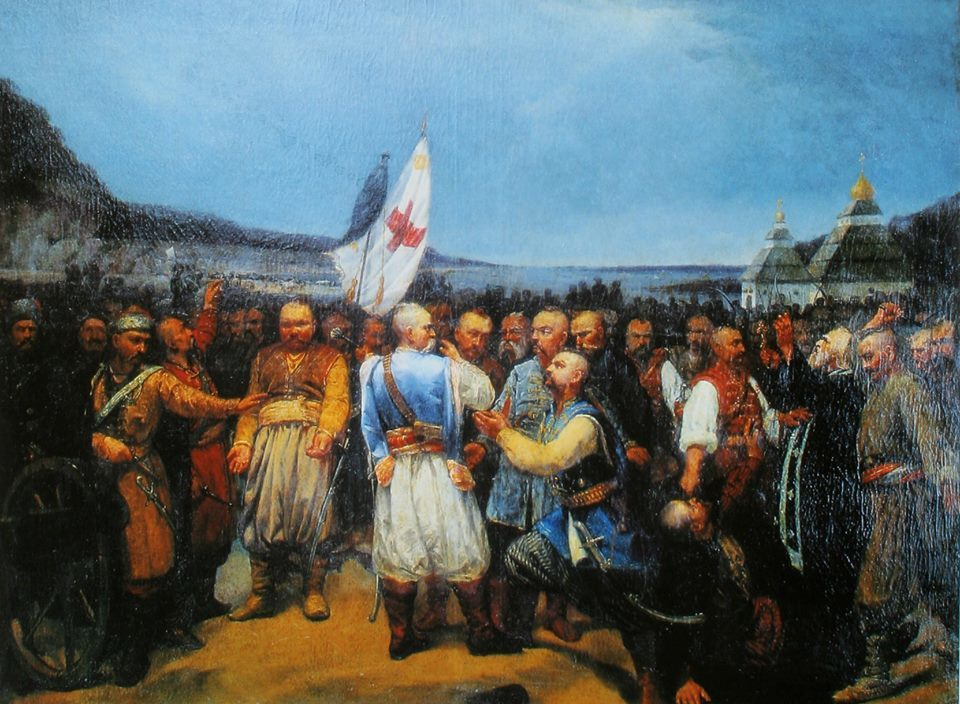
Last Rada on the Sich, a 19th-century painting depicting Kalnyshevsky and his fellow Cossacks immediately before the forced disbandment of their community by Russian imperial troops

Upon Kalnyshevsky's return to power, he put forward a petition to remove the Sich from the Little Russian Collegium and to place it under the Collegium of Foreign Affairs. This proposal incensed the Russian government, but due to a protracted decline in relations between Russia and the Ottoman Empire, Catherine decided against removing Kalnyshevsky from office. In the Russo-Turkish War of 1768–1774 Kalnyshevsky commanded Sich troops against the Ottomans, and he was decorated by Catherine as a result.

Kalnyshevsky's policies as kish otaman encouraged the colonisation of the wild fields by Cossacks, and he further sought the expansion of the Sich's grain production and trade to strengthen the Sich's economy.

Kalnyshevsky was also heavily involved in the construction of Eastern Orthodox churches, investing much of his own money to preserve and build churches in Kyiv, Romny and Lokhvytsia, among several other towns and villages. He also paid for the upkeep of the Church of the Intercession of the Holy Virgin on Khortytsia.

== Arrest, later life, and death ==
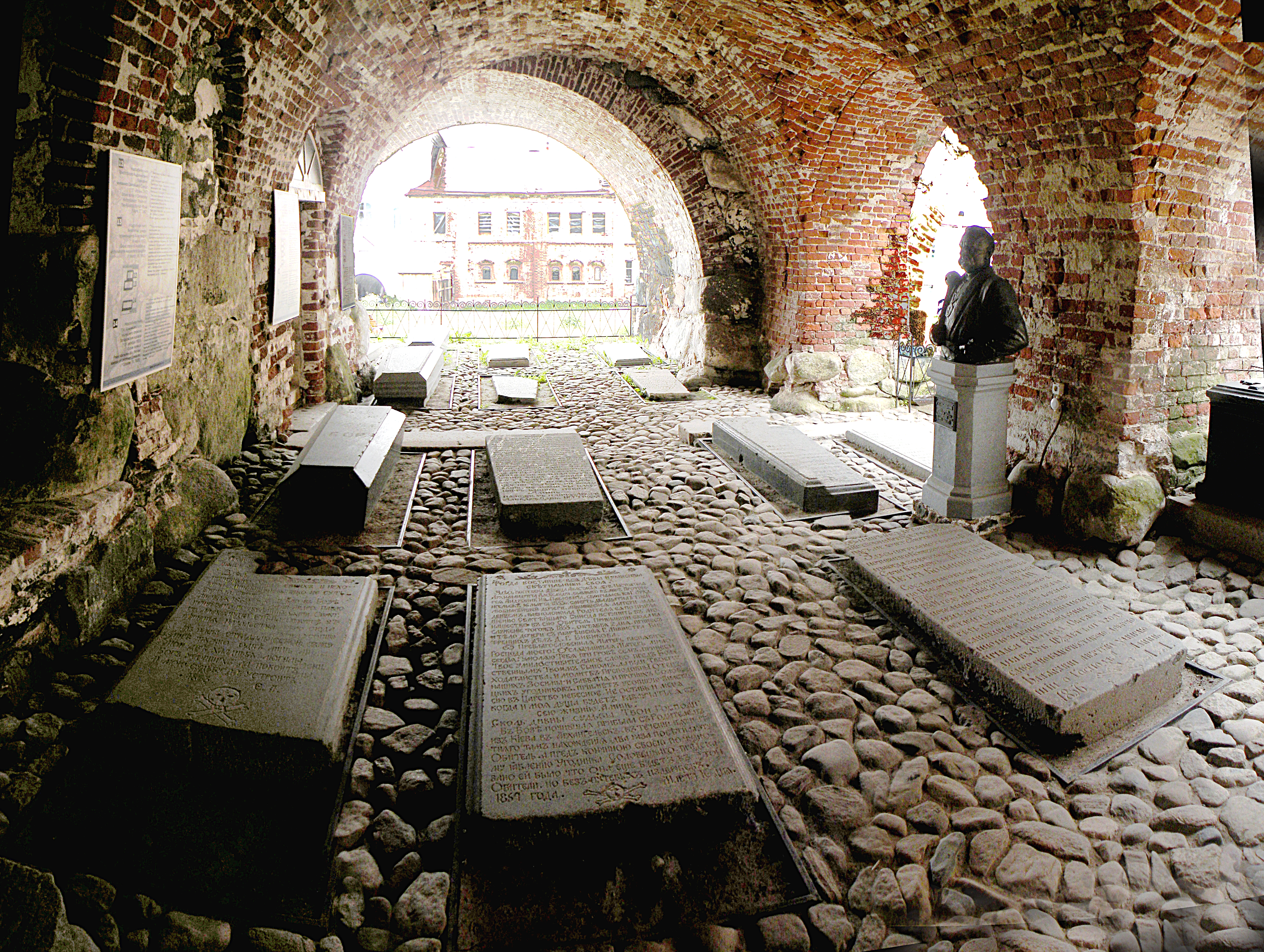
Kalnyshevsky's grave in Solovki Monastery, where he spent his last years as a prisoner

Following the liquidation of the Zaporozhian Sich, Kalnyshevsky was arrested by the Russian government on 4 June 1775. He was tried and in July 1776 incarcerated at Solovetsky Monastery in Russia, with the strict prohibition of correspondence or socialisation with anyone. In 1792, he was transferred to solitary confinement at the Povarnya jail in Russia, where he remained until 1802. When his cell was opened it was discovered that it had faeces two arshins (nearly four feet) deep. Being pardoned by Emperor Alexander I at the claimed age of 110 years, Kalnyshevsky (already blind at that time) decided to remain in the monastery, where he died two years later in 1803.

== Legacy ==
Kalnyshevsky has been credited by economist I. M. Rishniak as responsible for the development of Ukraine's agricultural industry and by keeping southern Ukraine from being permanently annexed into Russia. Varying schools of historiography, however, differ on assessments of Kalnyshevsky. Marxist and Soviet historiography has typically portrayed him as a landlord responsible for exploiting the Cossack masses with the support of the Russian government and emphasised his seizure of power as harmful to the Cossacks' democratic traditions. Ukrainian nationalist historiography, on the other hand, has emphasised his arrest, long imprisonment and eventual death, describing him as a martyr.

Kalnyshevsky has several streets named after him throughout Ukraine, including in Kyiv, Lviv, Dnipro, Kherson and Zhytomyr.

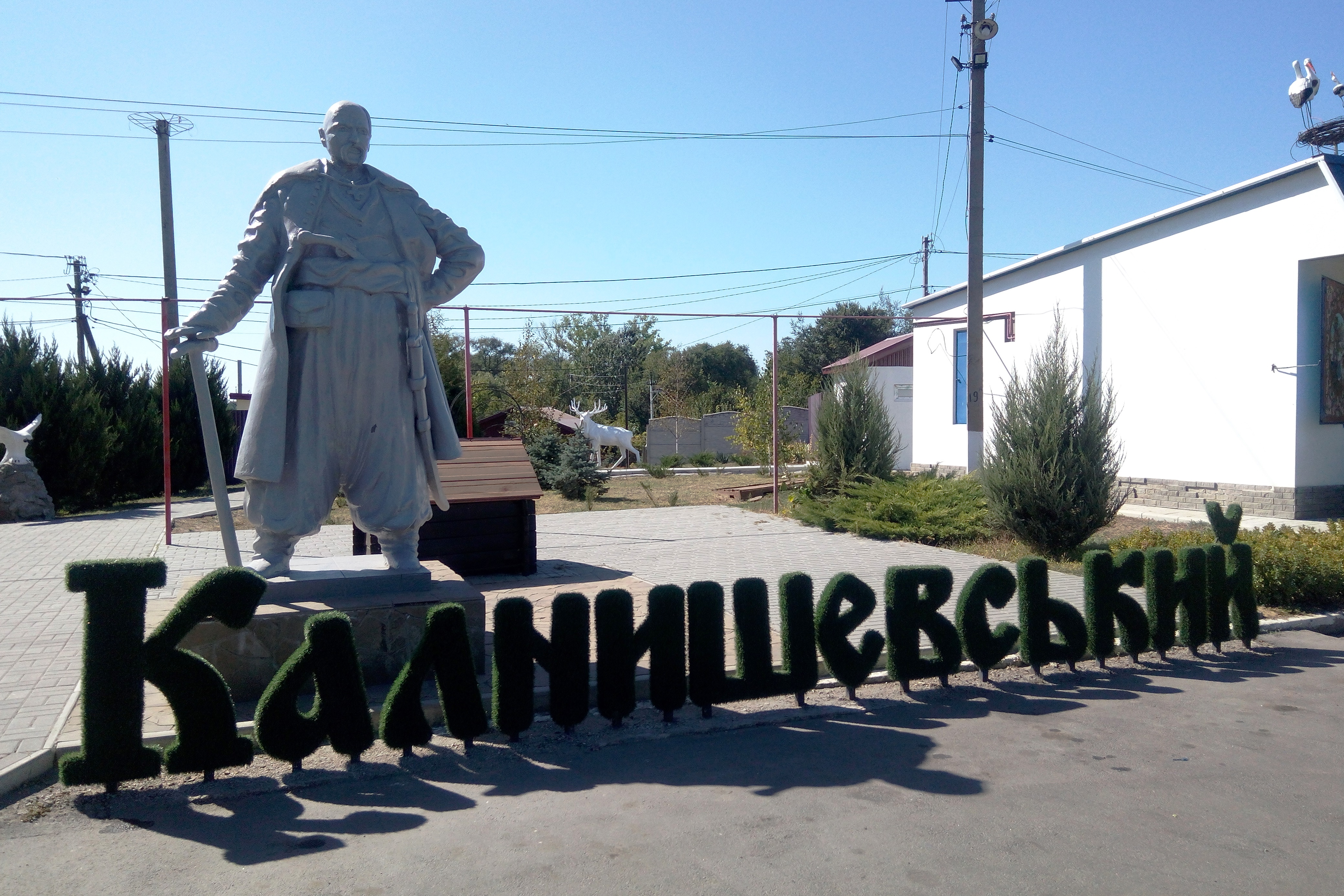
Monument to Kalnyshevsky in Petrykivka

Former President of Ukraine Viktor Yushchenko, himself a direct descendant of Kalnyshevsky, has been active in promoting his remembrance, including by helping to rebuild Kalnyshevsky's former Eastern Orthodox church. A celebration dedicated to Kalnyshevsky, Kalnysheva Rada, began in Romny Raion (the modern-day location of his likely place of birth) in 1991. It was recognised as a local holiday in Sumy Oblast by Yushchenko in 2005.

In 2017, Roman Turovsky-Savchuk composed a tombeau in honor of Kalnyshevsky.

Kalnyshevsky was canonised in Ukraine by the Ukrainian Orthodox Church – Kyiv Patriarchate in 2008. He was canonized by the Ukrainian Orthodox Church (Moscow Patriarchate) in 2014.

== See also ==
- History of the Cossacks
- List of last surviving veterans of military insurgencies and wars

== Sources ==
- Житіє праведного Петра Калнишевського, Life of Petro Kalnyshevsky on the official web-site of the Ukrainian Orthodox Church (Moscow Patriarchate), in Ukrainian.
- Documentary film about Petro Kalnyshevsky on the official web-site of the Ukrainian Orthodox Church (Moscow Patriarchate), in Russian.
- Коцур Г. Меценатська діяльність доби козаччини: історичний досвід церковного будівництва // Науковий вісник Чернівецького університету: Зб. наук. праць. – Чернівці, 2005.(in Ukrainian)
- Ефименко П.С. Калнишевскій, послъдній кошевой Запорожской Съчі. 1691 – 1803 // Русская старина. – 1875. – Т. XIV.(in Russian)
- Эварницкій Д.И. Послъдній кошевой атаманъ Петръ Ивановичь Калнишевскій. – Новочеркасскъ, 1887.(in Russian)
- Скальковський А.О. Історія Нової Січі, або останнього Коша Запорозького: Передм. та комент. Г.К.Швидько. – Дніпропетровськ, 1994.(in Ukrainian)
- Голобуцкий В.А. Запорожское казачество. – К., 1957.(in Russian)
- Апанович О. Розповіді про запорозьких козаків. – К., 1991.(in Ukrainian)
- Rishniak, I. M.; Sokhan, P. S.; Kucheruk, O. S.; Kulyniak, D. I.; Mavryn, O. O., eds. (2009). Петро Калнишевський та його доба. Збірник документів та матеріалів [Petro Kalnyshevsky and His Epoch: a Collection of Documents and Materials] (in Ukrainian). Kyiv: Vydavnytstvo. p. 432.
- Posunko, O. M. (2006). "П. Калнишевський і боротьба Січі з гайдамаччиною" [P. Kalnyshevsky and the Sich's battle with the haydamak movement]. Cossack Heritage (in Ukrainian). 3: 169–174.
