= Marivka =

Rural locality in Dnipropetrovsk Oblast, Ukraine

Marivka Мар'ївка
- Rural settlement
- Location within Dnipropetrovsk Oblast Location within Ukraine
- Coordinates: 47°36′55″N 34°37′12″E
- Country: Ukraine
- Oblast: Dnipropetrovsk Oblast
- Raion: Nikopol Raion
- Hromada: Marhanets urban hromada

Population (2022)
  - Total: 342
- Time zone: UTC+2 (EET)
  - Summer (DST): UTC+3 (EEST)

Marivka (Ukrainian: Мар'ївка; Russian: Марьевка) is a rural settlement in Nikopol Raion, Dnipropetrovsk Oblast, Ukraine. It is located on the right bank of the Dnieper (Kakhovka Reservoir), opposite to the city of Enerhodar and upstream of the city of Nikopol. Marivka belongs to Marhanets urban hromada, one of the hromadas of Ukraine. Population: 342 (2022 estimate).

== History ==
Until 18 July 2020, Marivka belonged to Marhanets Municipality, the administrative division subordinated to the city of oblast significance of Marhanets. The municipality was abolished in July 2020 as part of the administrative reform of Ukraine, which reduced the number of raions of Dnipropetrovsk Oblast to seven. The area of Marhanets Municipality was merged into Nikopol Raion.

Until 26 January 2024, Marivka was designated urban-type settlement. On this day, a new law entered into force which abolished this status, and Marivka became a rural settlement.

== Economy ==
=== Transportation ===
The closest railway station is in Marhanets, on a railway connecting Zaporizhzhia with Kryvyi Rih.

Marivka is connected by road with Marhanets, where there is access to Highway H23 to Zaporizhia and Kryvyi Rih. In the opposite direction, the road follows the bank of the Dnieper and eventually to Tomakivka.
