= Hirnytske, Dnipropetrovsk Oblast =

Rural locality in Dnipropetrovsk Oblast, Ukraine

Hirnytske Гірницьке
- Rural settlement
- Location within Dnipropetrovsk Oblast
- Coordinates: 48°04′24″N 33°33′25″E
- Country: Ukraine
- Oblast: Dnipropetrovsk Oblast
- Raion: Nikopol Raion

Population (2022)
  - Total: 341
- Time zone: UTC+2 (EET)
  - Summer (DST): UTC+3 (EEST)

Hirnytske (Ukrainian: Гірницьке; Russian: Горняцкое) is a rural settlement in Nikopol Raion, Dnipropetrovsk Oblast, Ukraine. Hirnytske is located on the left bank of the Solona, a tributary of the Dnieper, and northeast of Pokrov. It belongs to Pokrov urban hromada, one of the hromadas of Ukraine. Population: 341 (2022 estimate).

== History ==
Until 18 July 2020, Hirnytske belonged to Pokrov Municipality, the administrative division subordinated to the city of oblast significance of Pokrov. The municipality was abolished in July 2020 as part of the administrative reform of Ukraine, which reduced the number of raions of Dnipropetrovsk Oblast to seven. The area of Pokrov Municipality was merged into Nikopol Raion.

Until 26 January 2024, Hirnytske was designated urban-type settlement. On this day, a new law entered into force which abolished this status, and Hirnytske became a rural settlement.

== Economy ==
=== Transportation ===
Hirnytske is bounded by a railway from the south, bit this railway has no passenger traffic. The closest passenger railway station is in Chortomlyk, on the railway connecting Zaporizhzhia with Kryvyi Rih.

There is road access to Pokrov and Nikopol and further to Highway H23 which connects Zaporizhzhia and Kryvyi Rih.
