= Battle of Enerhodar =

Battle of the Russian invasion of Ukraine

Coordinates: 47°29′56″N 34°39′21″E

- Part of the southern front of the Russian invasion of Ukraine
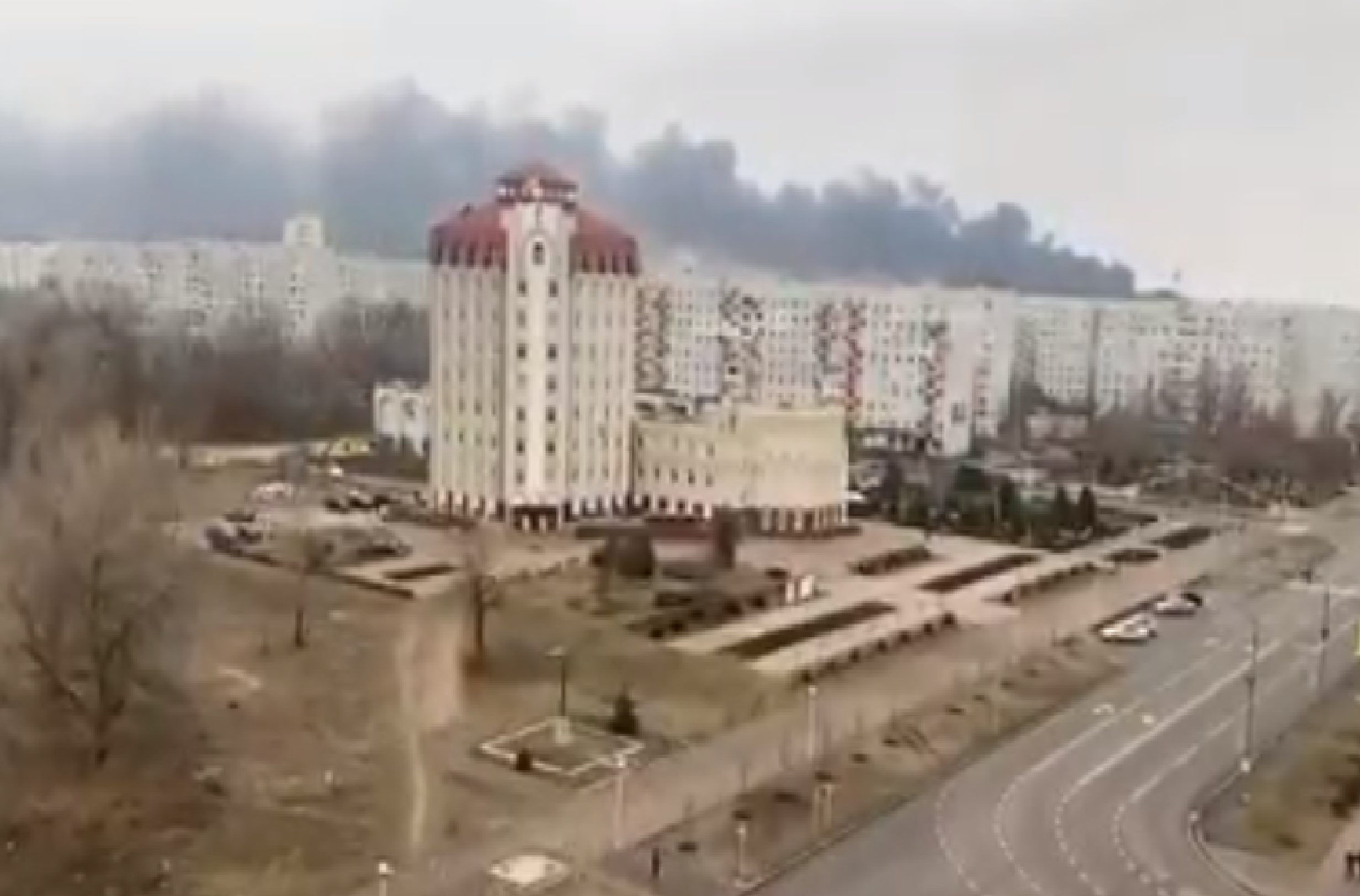
- Russian shelling of Enerhodar
Date	4 March 2022
Location	Enerhodar, Zaporizhzhia Oblast, Ukraine
Result	Russian victory

Belligerents
Russia	Ukraine

On 4 March 2022, a military engagement took place between the Russian Armed Forces and the Armed Forces of Ukraine over the city of Enerhodar in Zaporizhzhia Oblast, on the southern front of the Russian invasion of Ukraine. Enerhodar is the location of the Zaporizhzhia Nuclear Power Plant, which generates nearly half of the country's electricity derived from nuclear power and more than a fifth of total electricity generated in Ukraine, as well as a nearby thermal power station.

After attacking protesting civilians on 3 March, Russian forces engaged Ukrainian forces at the nuclear power plant and took control of it, seizing Enerhodar the same day.

== Background ==
On 28 February, the Russian Ministry of Defense announced that its forces had captured the city of Enerhodar and the Zaporizhzhia Nuclear Power Plant, though this was denied by the city's mayor, Dmytro Orlov and Energoatom, the Ukrainian state enterprise which operates the plant. Local citizens later barricaded the road to the plant and the entrance to the city, forcing the Russian forces to turn back.

On 1 March, Ukrainian officials stated that Russian forces had surrounded the city, with a Russian convoy heading into Enerhodar around 2:00 pm. According to Orlov, the city had difficulties obtaining food. In the evening, a protest by local residents blocked Russian forces from entering the city.

In the morning of 2 March, Orlov stated that Russian troops were again approaching the city. Protestors again blocked the roads; protestors carried Ukrainian flags and used garbage trucks as part of the blockade. Orlov told Ukrinform that two people were wounded when Russian soldiers allegedly threw grenades at a crowd of civilians. By 6:00 pm, the protest included two hundred residents, as well as power plant workers. Rafael Grossi, the Director General of the International Atomic Energy Agency, stated that the IAEA had been informed by Russian authorities that Russian forces were in control of territory around the nuclear power plant.

== Battle ==
At 11:28 pm local time on 3 March 2022, a column of 10 Russian armoured vehicles and two tanks cautiously approached the Zaporizhzhia Nuclear Power Plant. The action commenced at 12:48 am on 4 March when Ukrainian forces fired anti tank missiles at the tanks leading the column, and Russian forces responded with a variety of weapons, including rocket-propelled grenades. Russian forces then entered the parking area near the front gate. Most of the Russian fire was directed towards the training centre and main administrative building, but Russian forces also fired heavy weapons in the direction of the reactor buildings multiple times. During approximately two hours of heavy fighting a fire broke out in a training facility outside of the main complex, which was extinguished by 6:20 am, though other sections surrounding the plant sustained damage. Later that day, IAEA confirmed that the safety systems of the plant had not been affected and there was no release of radioactive material.

Russian forces also entered Enerhodar and took control of it. Orlov stated that the city lost its heating supply as a result of the battle.

== Aftermath ==
Oleksandr Starukh, the governor of Zaporizhzhia Oblast, stated on 5 March that Russian forces had left Enerhodar after looting it and the situation in the city was completely under control of local authorities. However, Orlov denied the report and stated that Russian forces still occupied the perimeter of the city and the power plant, with local authorities still managing the city. The Ukrainian military administration for the southeast confirmed on 7 March that Enerhodar was under control of Russian forces.

== See also ==
- Battle of Chernobyl
