= Hirnytske =

Hirnytske (Ukrainian: Гірницьке) may refer to the following places in Ukraine:

- Hirnytske, Dnipropetrovsk Oblast, urban-type settlement in Dnipropetrovsk Oblast
- Hirnytske, Donetsk Oblast, urban-type settlement in Donetsk Oblast
