= Chortomlyk =

Rural locality in Dnipropetrovsk Oblast, Ukraine

Chortomlyk Чортомлик
- Rural settlement
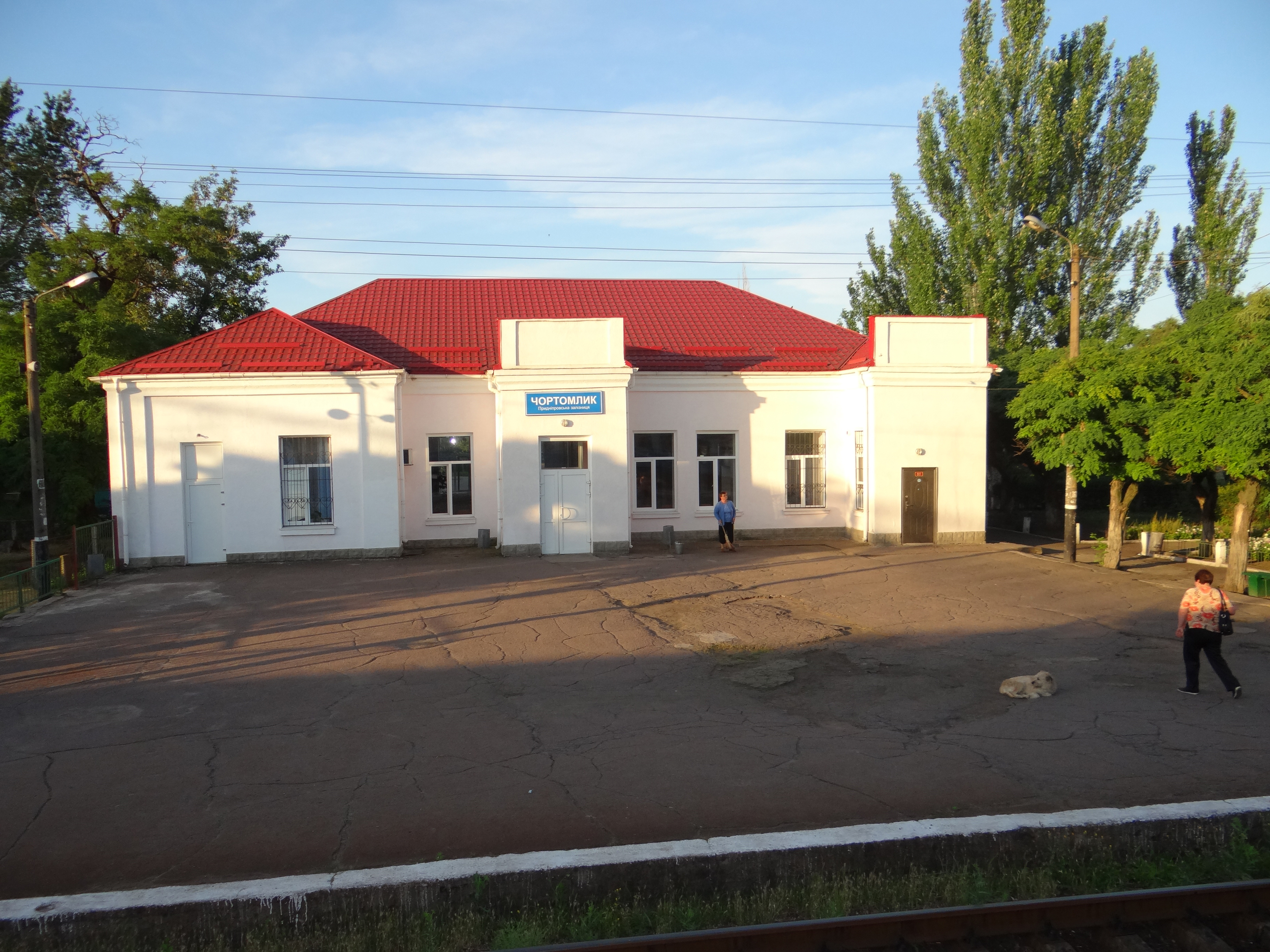

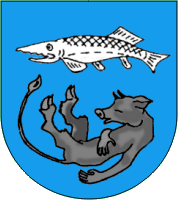
- Coat of arms

- Location within Ukraine Location within Dnipropetrovsk Oblast
- Coordinates: 47°37′02″N 34°08′04″E
- Country: Ukraine
- Oblast: Dnipropetrovsk Oblast
- Raion: Nikopol Raion

Population (2022)
  - Total: 1,290
- Time zone: UTC+2 (EET)
  - Summer (DST): UTC+3 (EEST)

Chortomlyk (Ukrainian: Чортомлик; Russian: Чертомлык) is a rural settlement in Nikopol Raion, Dnipropetrovsk Oblast, Ukraine. It is located on the right bank of the Dnieper (Kakhovka Reservoir), south of Pokrov and west of Nikopol. Chortomlyk belongs to Pokrov urban hromada, one of the hromadas of Ukraine. Population: 1,290 (2022 estimate).

== History ==
Until 18 July 2020, Chortomlyk belonged to Pokrov Municipality, the administrative division subordinated to the city of oblast significance of Pokrov. The municipality was abolished in July 2020 as part of the administrative reform of Ukraine, which reduced the number of raions of Dnipropetrovsk Oblast to seven. The area of Pokrov Municipality was merged into Nikopol Raion.

Until 26 January 2024, Chortomlyk was designated urban-type settlement. On this day, a new law entered into force which abolished this status, and Chortomlyk became a rural settlement.

== Economy ==
=== Transportation ===
There is a railway station in Chortomlyk, on the railway connecting Zaporizhzhia with Kryvyi Rih. There is regular passenger traffic.

Chortomlyk is on Highway H23 which connects Zaporizhzhia and Kryvyi Rih.
