= Enerhodar Dnipro Powerline Crossing =

Structure in the Kakhovka Reservoir, Ukraine

Coordinates: 47°33′53.38″N 34°38′43.39″E

Enerhodar Dnipro Powerline Crossing consists of two overhead power lines that cross the Kakhovka Reservoir on the Dnipro river. They cross from Enerhodar and its two power stations on the south side to near Marhanets on the north side.

== History ==
The first power line was built in 1977 and runs from Zaporizhzhia Thermal Power Plant. It consists of five 100-metre and two 90-metre high pylons, which stand on caissons in the water. The caissons with the pylons were prefabricated and then erected in the reservoir.

In 1984 a 750 kV line with a single circuit for transmission of electricity produced in the Zaporizhzhia Nuclear Power Plant was built. It consists of three 126-metre and two 100-metre high pylons, which also stand on caissons in the reservoir.
