= Vladyslav Obraztsov =

Ukrainian footballer

Personal information
- Full name: Vladyslav Mykhaylovych Obraztsov
- Date of birth: 3 September 1994 (age 32)
- Place of birth: Ordzhonikidze, Ukraine
- Height: 1.81 m (5 ft 11 1/2 in)
- Position: Midfielder

Youth career
- 2006–2008: Youth Sportive School Ordzhonikidze
- 2009–2011: UFK Kharkiv

Senior career*
Years	Team	Apps	(Gls)
2012–2013	Dnipro Dnipropetrovsk	0	(0)
2013	Kryvbas Kryvyi Rih	0	(0)
2014	Dnepr Mogilev	14	(0)
2015–2016	Kolos Zachepylivka	11	(2)
2017–2018	Mynai	?	(?)
2018	Mynai	6	(0)
- * Club domestic league appearances and goals as of 1 February 2019

Vladyslav Mykhaylovych Obraztsov (Ukrainian: Владислав Михайлович Образцов; born 3 September 1994) is a Ukrainian former professional footballer.

In March 2014, Obraztsov signed deal with FC Dnepr until 2016, but in December 2014, he left the team.
