= Tomakivka =

Rural locality in Dnipropetrovsk Oblast, Ukraine

Tomakivka Томаківка
- Rural settlement
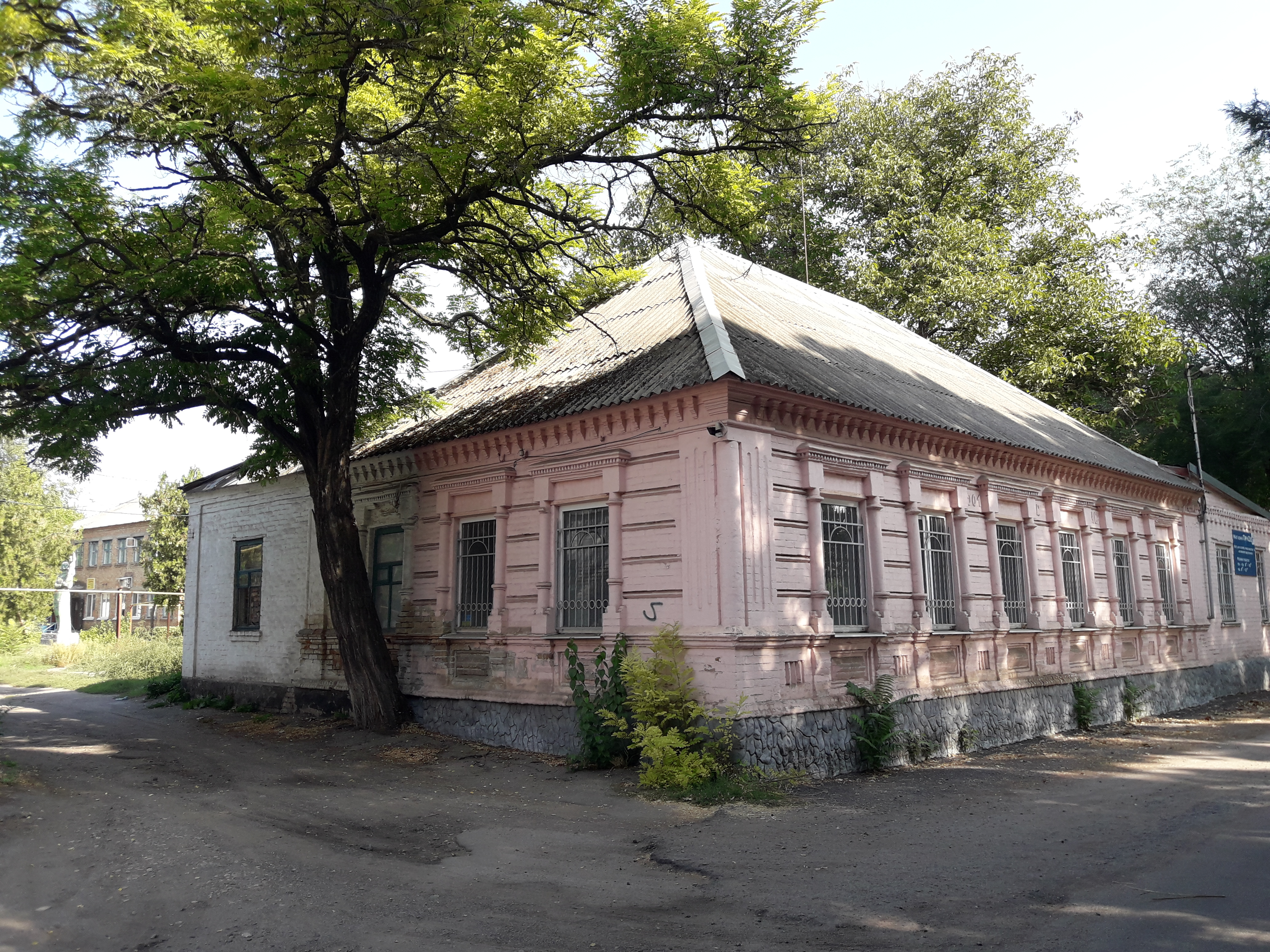

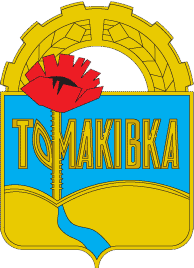
- Seal

- Location of Tomakivka Tomakivka (Dnipropetrovsk Oblast)
- Coordinates: 47°49′N 34°44′E
- Country: Ukraine
- Oblast: Dnipropetrovsk Oblast
- Raion: Nikopol Raion
- Sloboda-status: 1777
- Town status: 1956

Government
  - Council Head: Volodymyr Marchenko

Population (2001)
  - Total: 8,090
- Website: tomak.dp.gov.ua

Tomakivka (Ukrainian: Томаківка, Russian: Томаковка) is a rural settlement in Nikopol Raion, Dnipropetrovsk Oblast, southeastern Ukraine. It is located on confluence of Tomakivka and Kyslichuvata rivers. Tomakivka hosts the administration of Tomakivka settlement hromada, one of the hromadas of Ukraine. Population: 6,559 (2022 estimate).

== History ==
In 1535, the first Cossack host (within the modern-day city limits of Marhanets) founded was the Tomakivka Sich, located on the Tomakivka Island near the mouth of the Tomakivka River. In 1552, a permanent settlement was established in the region under the name "Ukhod Tomakivka."

The modern settlement of Tomakivka has direct roots in the former Cossack host on Tomakivka Island. After the autonomy of the Cossack Hetmanate was abolished in 1764, many of such cossack villages were more densely populated. In 1777, Tomakivka was granted sloboda status.

Until 18 July 2020, Tomakivka was the administrative center of Tomakivka Raion. The raion was abolished in July 2020 as part of the administrative reform of Ukraine, which reduced the number of raions of Dnipropetrovsk Oblast to seven. The area of Tomakivka Raion was merged into Nikopol Raion.

Until 26 January 2024, Tomakivka was designated urban-type settlement. On this day, a new law entered into force which abolished this status, and Tomakivka became a rural settlement.
