= Zaporizhzhia Nuclear Power Plant =

Nuclear-power plant in Enerhodar, Ukraine

Zaporizhzhia Nuclear Power Station

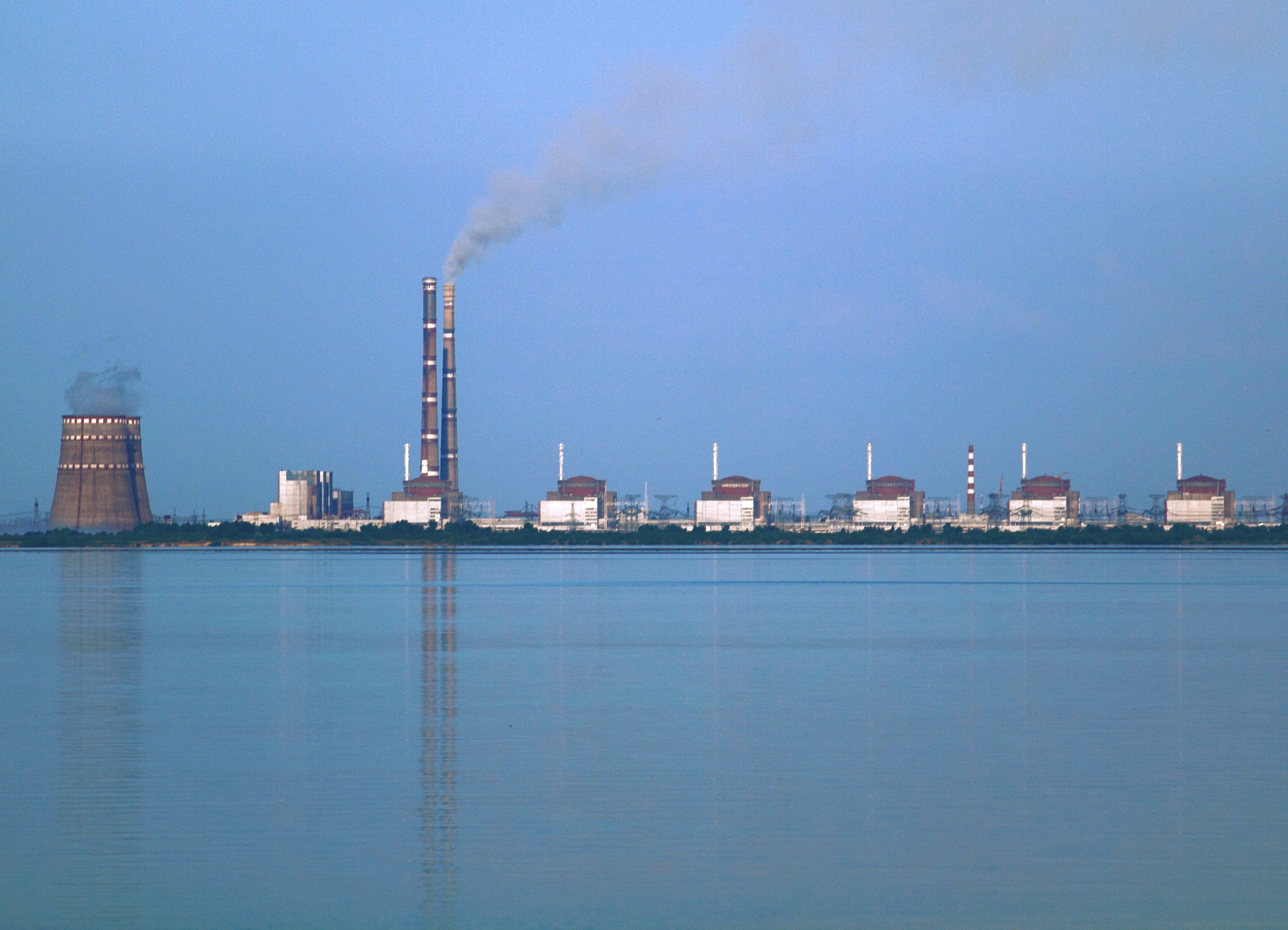
- Two dark cooling towers at left, one largely obscured by the other, and the six reactor buildings viewed from 12 km distance from the west from Nikopol on the right shore of the (since 2023 empty) Kakhovka Reservoir. The large building between the cooling towers and the reactors, and the two tall smokestacks, are at the Zaporizhzhia thermal power station, beyond the nuclear plant. (2009)
- Official name: Запорізька атомна електростанція
- Country: Ukraine (under Russian occupation since 2022)
- Location: Enerhodar, Zaporizhzhia Oblast
- Coordinates: 47°30′30″N 34°35′04″E
- Status: Shutdown
- Construction began: Unit 1: 1 April 1980; Unit 2: 1 January 1981; Unit 3: 1 April 1982; Unit 4: 1 April 1983; Unit 5: 1 November 1985; Unit 6: 1 June 1986
- Commission date: Unit 1: 25 December 1985; Unit 2: 15 February 1986; Unit 3: 5 March 1987; Unit 4: 14 April 1988; Unit 5: 27 October 1989; Unit 6: 17 September 1996
- Owners: Energoatom (de jure); Rosatom (de facto)
- Operators: Energoatom (de jure); Rosatom (de facto)

Nuclear power station
- Reactors: 6
- Reactor type: PWR
- Reactor supplier: Atomstroyexport
- Cooling towers: 2
- Cooling source: Kakhovka Reservoir
- Thermal capacity: 6 × 3000 MW_{th}

Power generation
- Units operational: 6 × 950 MW
- Make and model: 6 × VVER-1000/320
- Nameplate capacity: 5700 MW
- Capacity factor: 58.68%
- Annual net output: 29,299 GWh (2016); 38,000 GWh

External links
- Website: energoatom.com.ua/en/branch/zaporizka-aes
- Commons: Related media on Commons

The Zaporizhzhia Nuclear Power Station (Ukrainian: Запорізька атомна електростанція; Zaporiz'ka atomna elektrostancija) in southeastern Ukraine is the largest nuclear power plant in Europe and among the 10 largest in the world. It has been under Russian control since 2022. It was built by the Soviet Union near the city of Enerhodar, on the southern shore of the Kakhovka Reservoir on the Dnieper river. From 1996 to 2022, it was operated by Energoatom, which operates the other three nuclear power stations in Ukraine.

An annotated Landsat 9 photograph of Zaporizhzia Nuclear Power Plant, February 2022: 1–6. / Reactor units 1–6; 7. / Electricity pylons; 8. / Training building shelled; 9. / Radioactive waste storage; 10. / Cooling pond (8.2 km²); 11. / Cooling towers; 12. / Kakhovka Reservoir (empty since July 2023)

The plant has six VVER-1000 pressurized light water nuclear reactors (PWR), each fueled with ^{235}U (LEU) and generating 950 MW_{e}, for a total power output of 5,700 MW_{e}. The first five were successively brought online between 1985 and 1989, and the sixth was added in 1995. In 2020, the plant generated nearly half of the country's electricity derived from nuclear power, and more than a fifth of total electricity generated in Ukraine. The Zaporizhzhia thermal power station is nearby.

On 4 March 2022, days into the Russian invasion of Ukraine, Russian forces seized both the nuclear and thermal power stations. As of 12 March 2022, the Russian company Rosatom claimed control over the plant. Since its capture, the plant does not generate power and is mostly shut down.

== Facilities ==
The spent nuclear fuel is stored in cooling pools inside the reactor containments for up to five years. It is then transferred to an on-site dry cask storage facility that was commissioned in 2004. The reactors and spent fuel pools formerly depended on water from the Kakhovka Reservoir for cooling. The reservoir was created by the Kakhovka Hydroelectric Power Plant dam, much of which was destroyed in June 2023 while it was under Russian control. Cooling water for the shut-down reactors and other essential nuclear safety services is now provided by 11 groundwater wells.

Formerly, the electricity generated was supplied to the Ukrainian grid through four 750 kV overhead transmission lines and one 330 kV line. One of the 750 kV lines runs northwards across the Kakhovka Reservoir and on to the Dniprovska substation just south of Vilnohirsk in Dnipropetrovsk Oblast. The other three 750 kV lines ran south from the plant and were destroyed. One diverged from the others near the village of Zapovitne and ran to the Kakhovska substation just west of Nova Kakhovka. This was the newest of the lines and was commissioned in 2021. Two lines continued south-southeast, diverging at the urban-type settlement of Mykhailivka. One continued southeast to the Pivdennodonbaska mines in Donetsk Oblast, while the other continued east and then north to the Zaporizka substation north of Znackove in Zaporizhzhia Oblast. The 330 kV line runs to the neighbouring Zaporizhzhia thermal power station.

In 2017, modernization work was completed on reactor unit 3, enabling a 10-year life extension to 2027. In 2021, modernization work was completed on unit 5, enabling a 10-year life extension.

Because it is missing three of the four 750 kV supply lines and the Kakhovka Reservoir for cooling water, Energoatom reports that the reactors cannot safely be restarted.

== Incidents ==
=== 1984 electrical fire ===
On 27 January 1984, a major fire started during commissioning of unit 1, before any nuclear fuel was in the reactor. An electrical relay caused PVC insulation to catch fire, molten PVC causing more fires below in a vertical shaft. More than 4,000 control units, 41 motors, and 700 kilometres (430 mi) of cables were damaged.

=== 2014 unrest and safety concerns ===
The Zaporizhzhia power plant is located around 200 kilometres (120 mi) from the war in Donbas combat zone, where fighting started in 2014.

On 3 December 2014, Prime Minister Arseny Yatseniuk announced the occurrence of an incident several days before at the Zaporizhzhia Nuclear Power Plant. The cause of the incident was reported as a short circuit in the power outlet system and was not linked to the site's production. One of the six reactors of the plant was shut down twice in December 2014. This and lack of coal for Ukraine's coal-fired power stations led to rolling blackouts throughout the country from early until late December 2014.

=== 2022 Russian occupation of the plant ===
After the Russian invasion of Ukraine began on 24 February 2022, Energoatom shut down Units 5 and 6 to reduce risk, keeping Units 1 to 4 in operation on 25 February.

At 11:28 pm local time on 3 March 2022, a column of 10 Russian armored vehicles and two tanks approached the power plant. Fighting commenced at 12:48am on 4 March when Ukrainian forces fired anti-tank missiles at the advancing Russians. Russian forces responded with a variety of weapons, including rocket-propelled grenades. During approximately two hours of heavy combat, a fire broke out in a training facility outside the main complex, which was extinguished by 6:20am, though other sections surrounding the plant sustained damage.

The fire did not impact reactor safety or any essential equipment. The plant lost 1.3 GW of capacity. It was later learned that a large caliber bullet pierced an outer wall of Reactor No. 4 and an artillery shell hit a transformer at Reactor No. 6. The potential catastrophe quickly led Ukraine's President Volodymyr Zelenskyy to accuse Russian leader Vladimir Putin of “nuclear terrorism”.

Ukrayinska Pravda reported on 12 March 2022 that the plant's management was told by Russian authorities that the plant now belonged to Rosatom, Russia's state nuclear power company. It continued to operate and supply data, including from a remote monitoring system, to the IAEA, and continued to be operated by Ukrainian staff, under Russian control. Satellite imagery from 9 July 2022 and 7 August 2022 shows that Russian forces established bases and defensive positions next to the reactor units, along the central supply route and on the periphery of the facility.

On 3 September 2022 an IAEA delegation visited the plant and on 6 September 2022 a report was published documenting damage and potential threats to plant security caused by external shelling and the presence of occupying troops in the plant.

With the declared annexation of Zaporizhzhia oblast, Russia also declared legal takeover of the plant, while the actual control over its operations continued to be unclear as of October 2022. Russian forces detained a number of plant's Ukrainian employees—starting from its deputy director Valery Martynyuk, his assistant Oleh Oshek, and IT manager Oleh Kostyukov—without providing any justification for their detainment.

As of November 2022, Ukrainian cities had drawn up plans for evacuation centers and secured supplies of potassium iodide pills, and 10% of Ukrainian emergency medical teams had been reconfigured to respond to chemical, biological, radiation, and nuclear risks.

The destruction of the nearby Kakhovka Dam on 6 June 2023 was reported to have no immediate risk to the plant. Generally five units have been in cold shutdown with one unit kept in hot shutdown, which the IAEA reported was necessary to produce steam for nuclear safety purposes, including the processing of liquid radioactive waste in storage tanks. The IAEA is urging the investigation of whether an external boiler can be installed as an alternative to keeping one unit in hot shutdown.

On 19 January 2024, the IAEA reported the presence of mines along the perimeter of the power plant's territory, in the buffer zone between the inner and outer fences of the facility. According to the Agency it is "inconsistent with the IAEA safety standards." Mines that had been found there previously were removed in November 2023.

On 7 April 2024, the IAEA reported that the plant was attacked by drones, apparently targeting surveillance and communication equipment. Russian troops tried to shoot down the drones without success. There was at least one casualty outside a laboratory, three direct hits on reactor containment structures and minor superficial scorching on the Unit 6 reactor dome. Although the nuclear safety was not compromised as there was no evidence of any structural damage to systems, the Agency considers the strike to be a major threat to nuclear safety.

On 11 August 2024, a fire broke out at one of the plant's cooling towers (which are not in use as long as the reactors remain shut down), leading to mutual accusations between Ukraine and Russia over its cause. Ukrainian President Volodymyr Zelenskyy said that Russian forces intentionally started the fire to blackmail Kyiv, while Russian-installed officials in the region blamed Ukrainian shelling. Despite the tensions, both sides confirmed that there was no radiation spike or immediate nuclear danger. The incident occurred amid Ukraine's significant military advances into Russian territory, marking a deepening of the conflict.

IAEA Director General Grossi said "The evidence gathered reinforces our conclusion that the main fire seems unlikely to be at the base of the cooling tower.” Days later, the IAEA team at the plant reported that the damage seemed to have been caused by a drone equipped with an explosive payload.

In December 2025 and February 2026, Rostekhnadzor issued 10-year operating licenses for Units 1 and 2 respectively, 40 years after they began operating, to pave the way "for the future development of nuclear power generation in the region". Pre-war Ukrainian operating licenses had previously been temporarily recognised, and extended, by Russia.

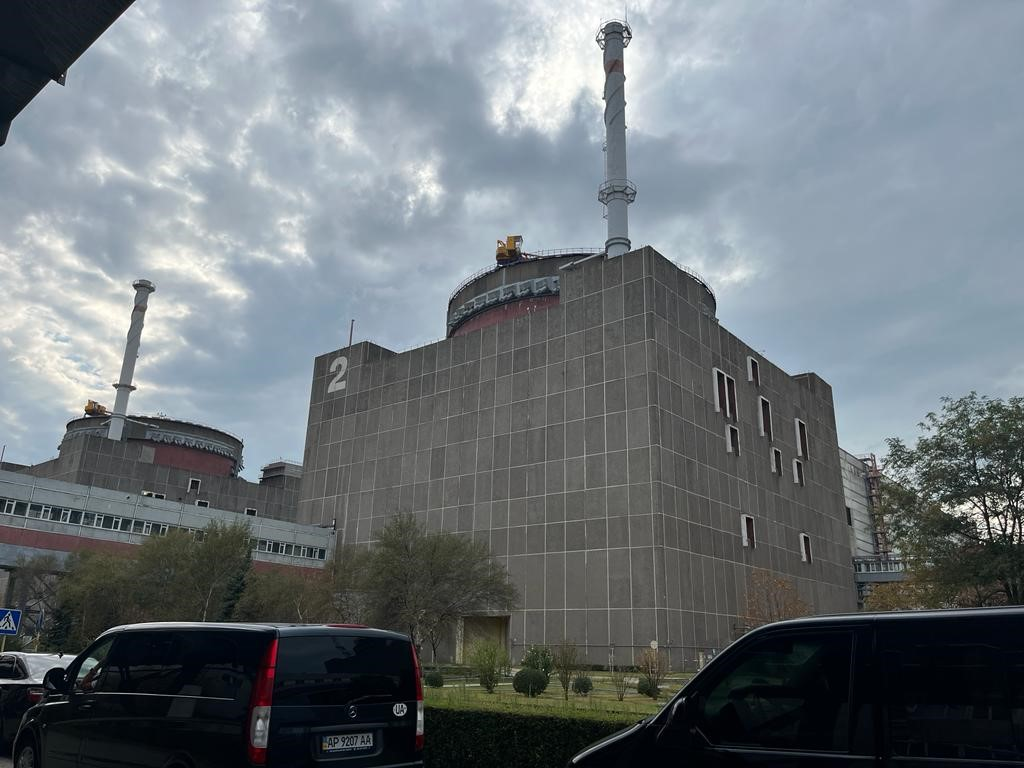
Reactor 2 during the September 2022 IAEA inspection

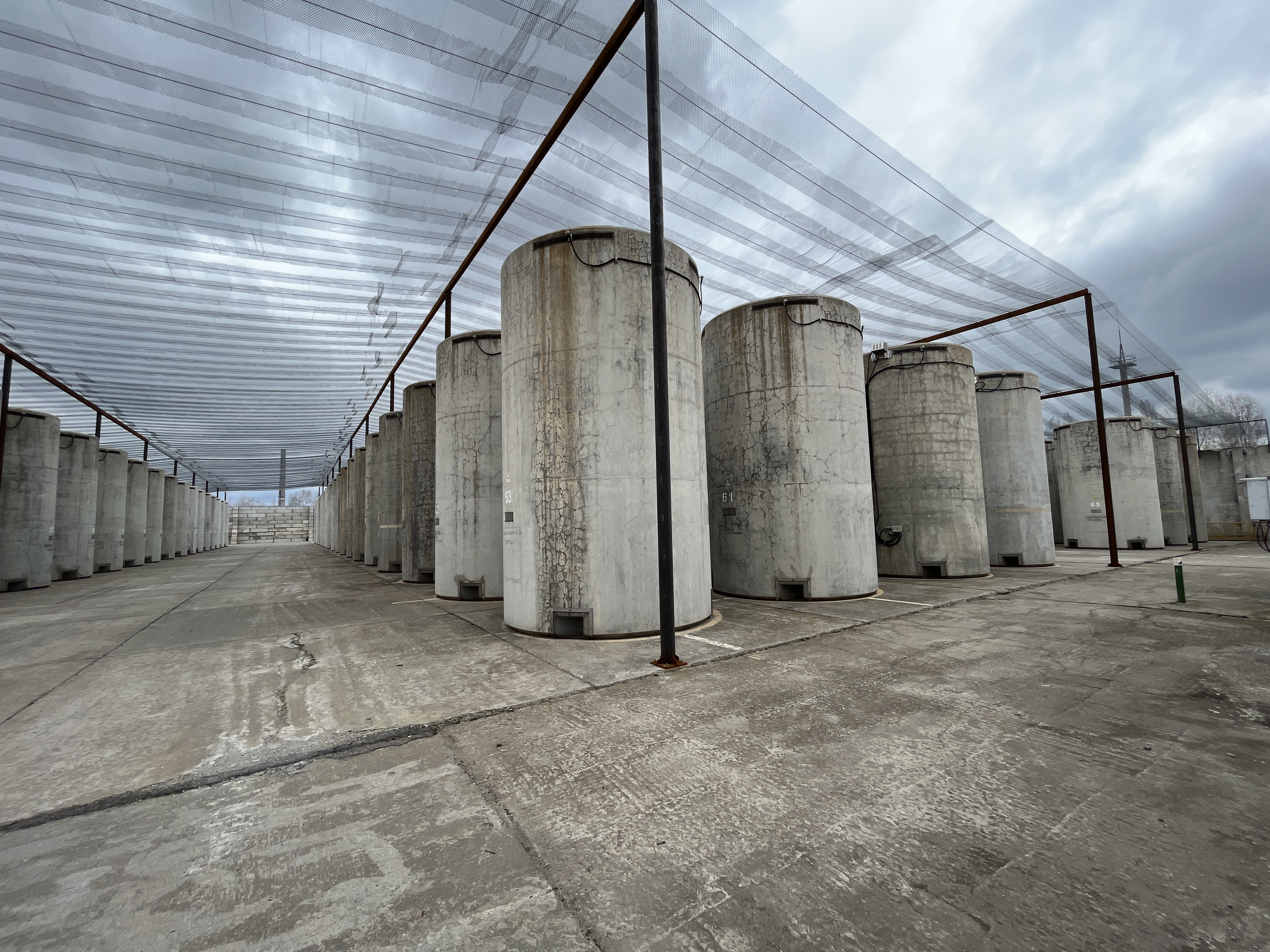
The dry cask storage facility for spent nuclear fuel

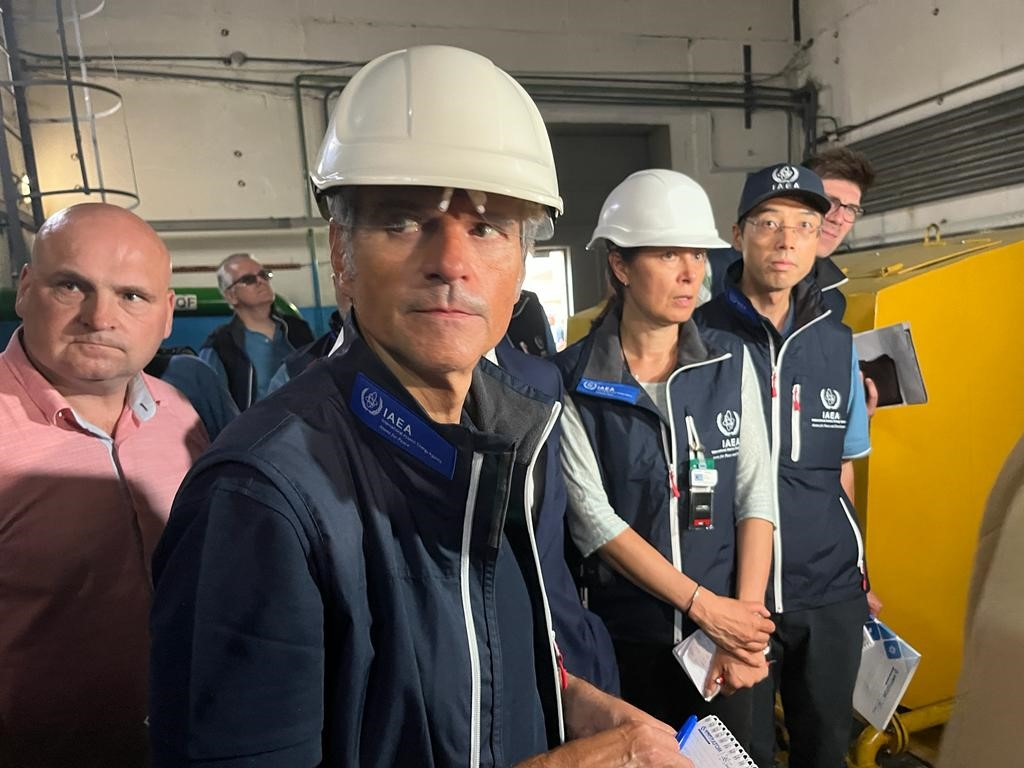
IAEA Director General Rafael Grossi and mission team members at the plant in September 2022

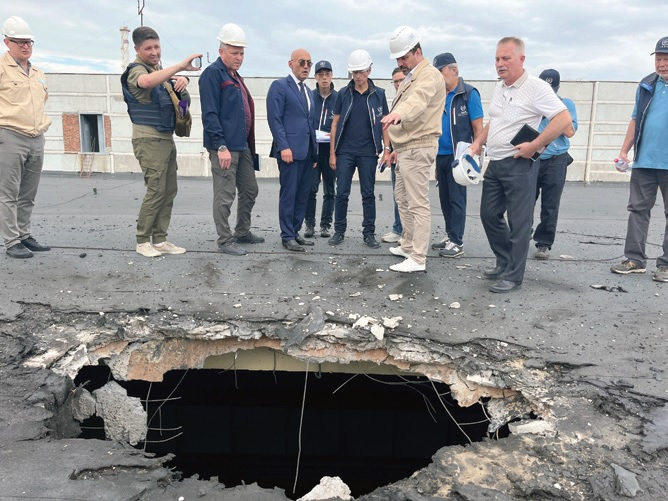
Shell damage to the roof of the building housing solid radioactive waste and fresh nuclear fuel, September 2022

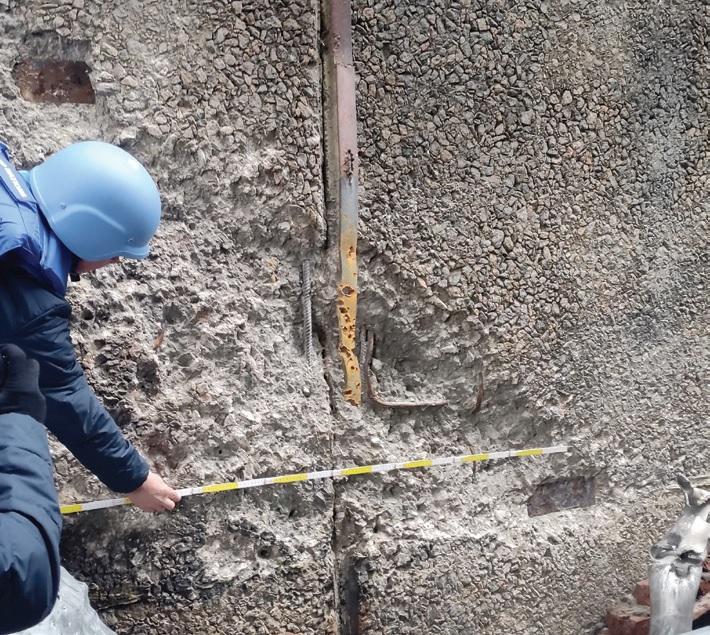
Shell damage on Unit 4 reactor building, November 2022

== See also ==
- Energy in Ukraine
- Enerhodar Dnipro Powerline Crossing
- List of power stations in Ukraine
- Nuclear power in Ukraine
- Zaporizhzhia Nuclear Power Plant crisis
