= Pokrov urban hromada =

Pokrov urban hromada Покровська міська громада
- Hromada
- Interactive map of Pokrov urban hromada
- Country: Ukraine
- Oblast: Dnipropetrovsk Oblast
- Raion: Nikopol Raion
- Admin. center: Pokrov

Area
  - Total: 170.37 km^{2} (65.78 sq mi)

Population (2018)
  - Total: 44,471
  - Density: 261.03/km^{2} (676.05/sq mi)
- CATOTTG code: UA12140250000015858
- Settlements: 6
- Cities: 1
- Rural settlements: 2
- Villages: 3
- Website: pkrv.dp.gov.ua

Pokrov urban territorial hromada (Ukrainian: Покровська міська територіальна громада, romanized: Pokrovska miska terytorialna hromada) is one of the hromadas of Ukraine, located in Nikopol Raion within Dnipropetrovsk Oblast. The administrative center is the city of Pokrov.

The area of the territory is 170.37 square kilometres (65.78 mi^{2}), the population of the hromada is 44,471 (2018).

== History ==
Formed on November 23, 2018, by merging the Sholokhove Village Council of Nikopol Raion with the Pokrov City Council of regional significance.

In accordance with the Law of Ukraine "On Amendments to the Law of Ukraine "On Voluntary Association of Territorial Hromadas" regarding the voluntary accession of territorial hromadas of villages, settlements to territorial hromadas of cities of republican significance of the Autonomous Republic of Crimea, regional significance", communities formed as a result of the accession of adjacent communities to cities of regional significance are recognized as capable and do not require elections.

== Composition ==
The community includes 6 settlements - the city of Pokrov, the rural settlements of Hirnytske and Chortomlyk, and 3 villages: Myronivka, Ulianivka, and Sholokhove.
