= Tomakivka Raion =

Former subdivision of Dnipropetrovsk Oblast, Ukraine

Tomakivka Raion Томаківський район
- Raion
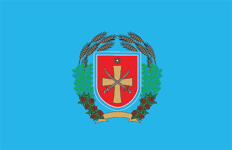
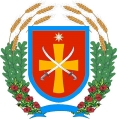
- Flag Coat of arms

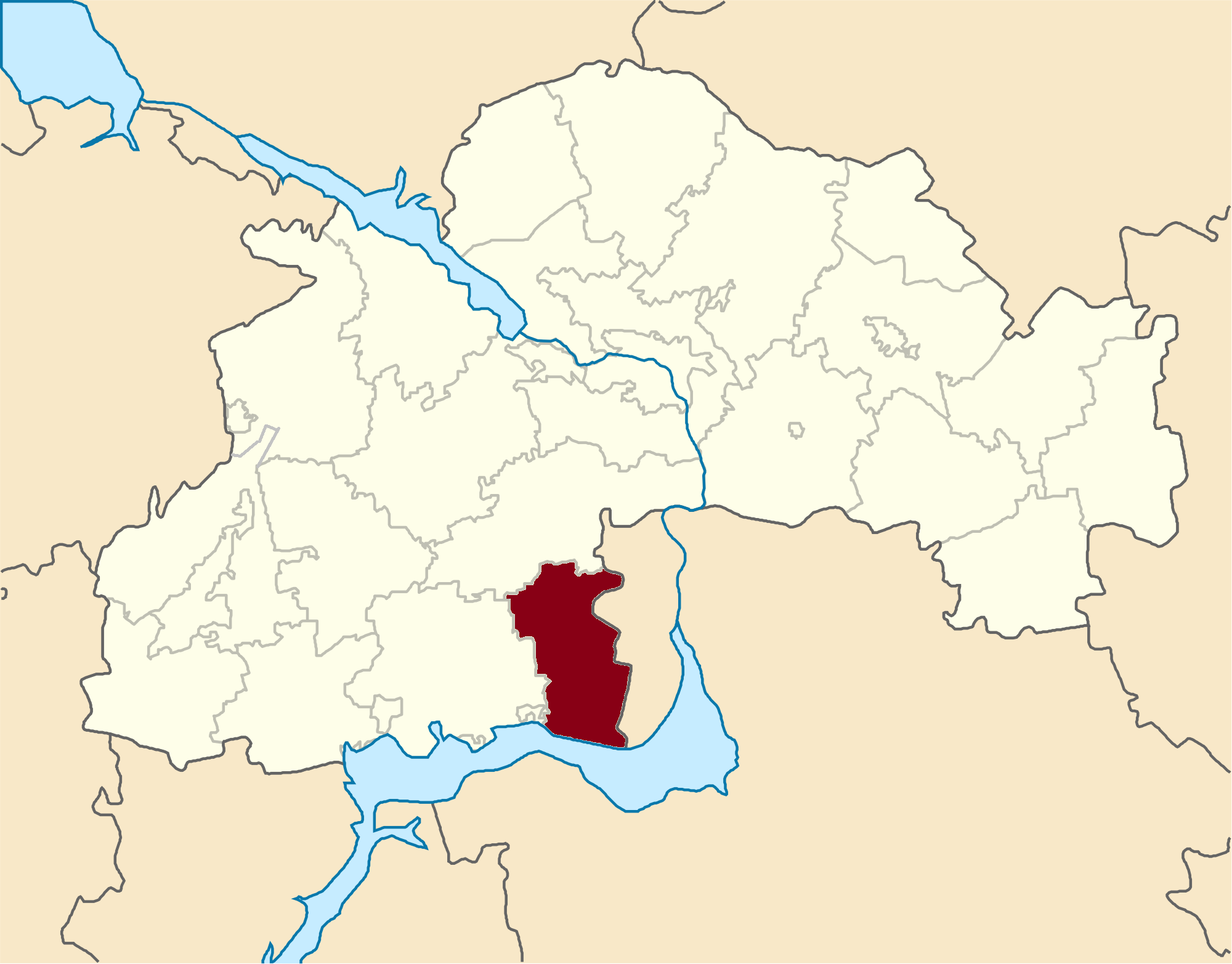
- Coordinates: 47°49′N 34°44′E
- Country: Ukraine
- Region: Dnipropetrovsk Oblast
- Disestablished: 18 July 2020
- Admin. center: Tomakivka
- Subdivisions: List: — city councils; — settlement councils; — rural councils; Number of localities: — cities; — urban-type settlements; — villages; — rural settlements

Area
  - Total: 1,200 km^{2} (460 sq mi)

Population (2020)
  - Total: 23,749
  - Density: 20/km^{2} (51/sq mi)
- Time zone: UTC+02:00 (EET)
  - Summer (DST): UTC+03:00 (EEST)
- Area code: +380
- Website: http://www.tomak.dp.gov.ua/

Tomakivka Raion (Ukrainian: Томаківський район) was a raion (district) of Dnipropetrovsk Oblast, southeastern-central Ukraine. Its administrative centre was located at the urban-type settlement of Tomakivka. The raion covered an area of 1200 square kilometres. The raion was abolished on 18 July 2020 as part of the administrative reform of Ukraine, which reduced the number of raions of Dnipropetrovsk Oblast to seven. The area of Tomakivka Raion was merged into Nikopol Raion. The last estimate of the raion population was 23,749 (2020 est.).

At the time of disestablishment, the raion consisted of two hromadas:

- Myrove rural hromada with the administration in the settlement of Myrove;
- Tomakivka settlement hromada with the administration in Tomakivka.
