= Enerhodar =

City in Zaporizhzhia Oblast, Ukraine

Enerhodar Енергодар Энергодар
- City
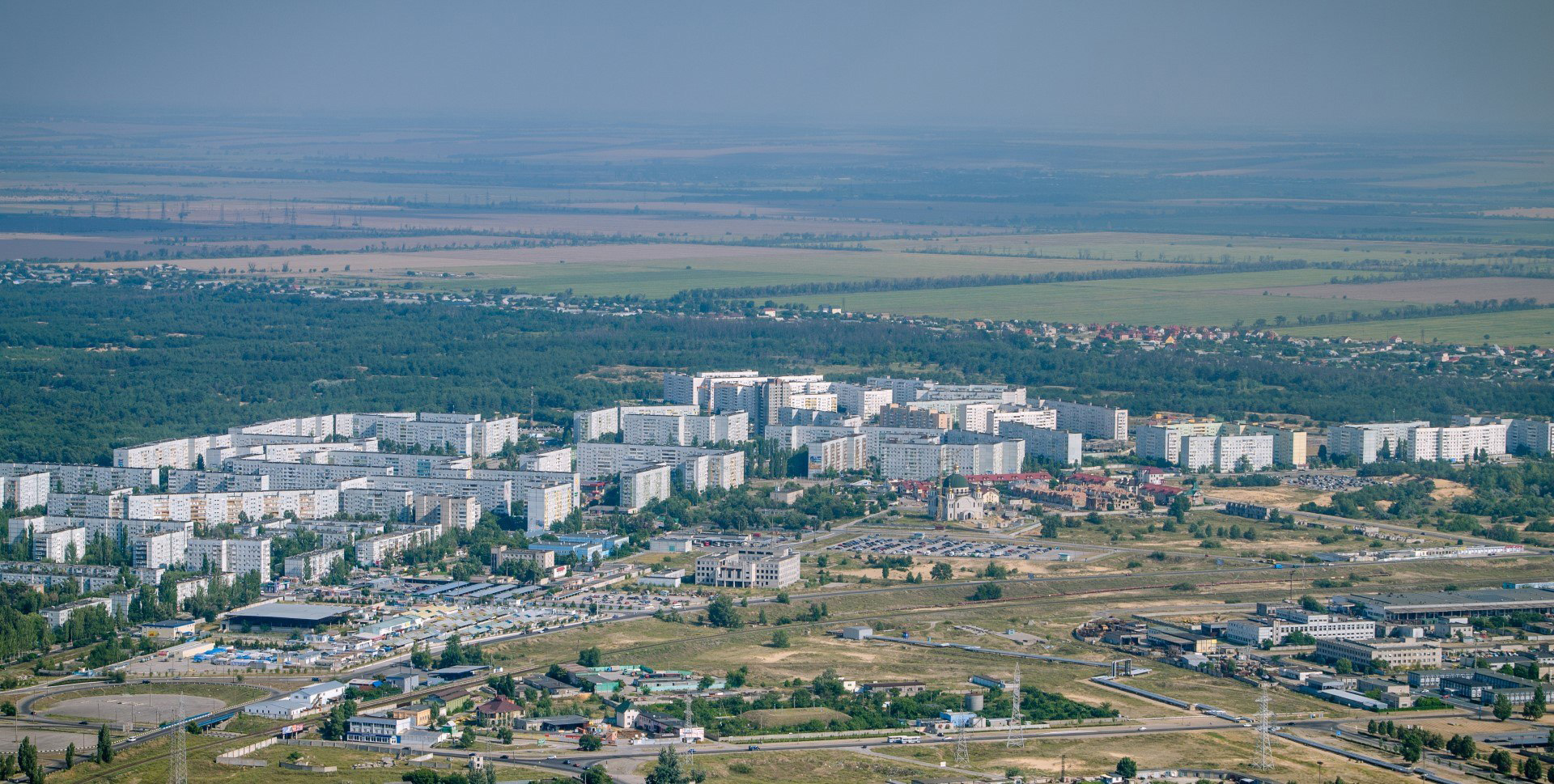
- Enerhodar viewed from a thermal power plant chimney

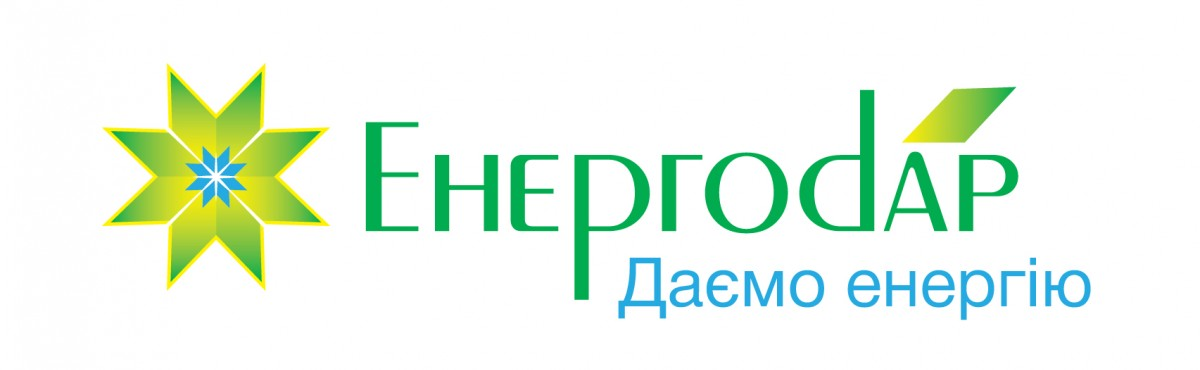
- Flag Coat of arms Brandmark
- Motto: We give energy (Ukrainian: Даємо енергію, romanized: Daiemo Enerhiiu)
- Interactive map of Enerhodar
- Location of Enerhodar in Zaporizhia Oblast Location of Enerhodar in Ukraine
- Coordinates: 47°29′56″N 34°39′21″E
- Country: Ukraine
- Oblast: Zaporizhzhia Oblast
- Raion: Vasylivka Raion
- Hromada: Enerhodar urban hromada
- Founded: 1970
- City status: 1985

Government
  - de jure Mayor: Dmytro Orlov
  - Russian appointed de facto mayor: Andriy Shevchik

Area
  - Total: 63.5 km^{2} (24.5 sq mi)
- Elevation: 29 m (95 ft)

Population (2022)
  - Total: 52,237
  - Density: 858/km^{2} (2,220/sq mi)
- Postal code: 71500—599
- Area code: +380 6139
- Climate: Dfa
- Website: www.en.gov.ua

Enerhodar (/ˌɛnərˈhoʊdɑːr/ EN-ər-HOH-dar; Ukrainian: Енергодар, IPA: [enerɦoˈdɑr], lit. 'energy's gift'; Russian: Энергодар, romanized: Energodar) is a city and municipality in the northwest of Zaporizhzhia Oblast, Ukraine. It is on the left bank of the Dnieper River, on the opposite side of the Kakhovka Reservoir from Nikopol and Chervonohryhorivka. Its main industry is electricity generation, at coal-fired and large nuclear power stations. It has an estimated population of 52,237 (2022 estimate). About 11,000 residents work at the nuclear power station. Since early 2022, it has been under Russian occupation.

== History ==
Enerhodar was founded on 12 June 1970 to build and serve the Zaporizhzhia thermal power station. For two years, the town had no name. Zaporizhzhia TPP was under construction, and the city grew. On 23 November 1972, the village of power engineers was named Enerhodar.

The complex development of Enerhodar was combined with the high rate of construction of the thermal power plant. Residential areas, kindergartens, the Energodar Hotel, and the Palace of Culture "Sovremennik" were built simultaneously with the plant's units. Zaporizhzhia Thermal Power Plant reached full capacity in September 1977.

It obtained city status in 1985, while part of the Ukrainian Soviet Socialist Republic of the Soviet Union. Zaporizhzhia Nuclear Power Plant, the largest nuclear power plant in Europe, was built there in the 1980s. Construction of the building began in 1980, and its first unit was commissioned in late 1985. In 1991, the city became part of independent Ukraine.

The city's two power plants continue to be major employers for its inhabitants into the 21st century.

=== Russo-Ukrainian War ===
On 28 February 2022, Russia claimed to have captured the city and the nuclear power plant. The mayor of Enerhodar, Dmytro Orlov, denied the claim.

Civilians built a large barricade of sandbags and vehicles on the road to the nuclear power plant in an attempt to hinder Russian troop advancement. The Ukrainian military administration for the southeast confirmed on 7 March that Enerhodar had been occupied by Russian forces.

== Demographics ==
As of the Ukrainian national census in 2001, Enerhodar had a population of 56,180 inhabitants, making it the fourth-largest city in the Zaporizhzhia Oblast. In terms of ethnicity, Ukrainians make up a solid majority in the city, followed by a large minority of ethnic Russians. Small Belarusian, Bulgarian and Armenian communities also exist in Enerhodar. When being asked about their native language, roughly 62% of the population stated that they primarily spoke Russian, while almost 38% spoke Ukrainian. The exact ethnic and linguistic composition was as follows:

Ethnic groups in Enerhodar
	percent
Ukrainians	57.14%
Russians	39.83%
Belarusians	0.76%
Bulgarians	0.34%
Tatars	0.23%
Armenians	0.19%
Germans	0.17%
Azerbaijanis	0.15%
others	1.19%

Primary languages (2001)
	percent
Russian	61.7%
Ukrainian	37.8%
Belarusian	0.1%
Armenian	0.1%
Moldovan	0.1%
others	0.2%

== Points of interest ==
- Enerhodar Dnipro Powerline Crossing
- Zaporizhzhia Nuclear Power Plant
- Zaporizhzhia thermal power station (Zaporizhzhia DRES)

== Gallery ==
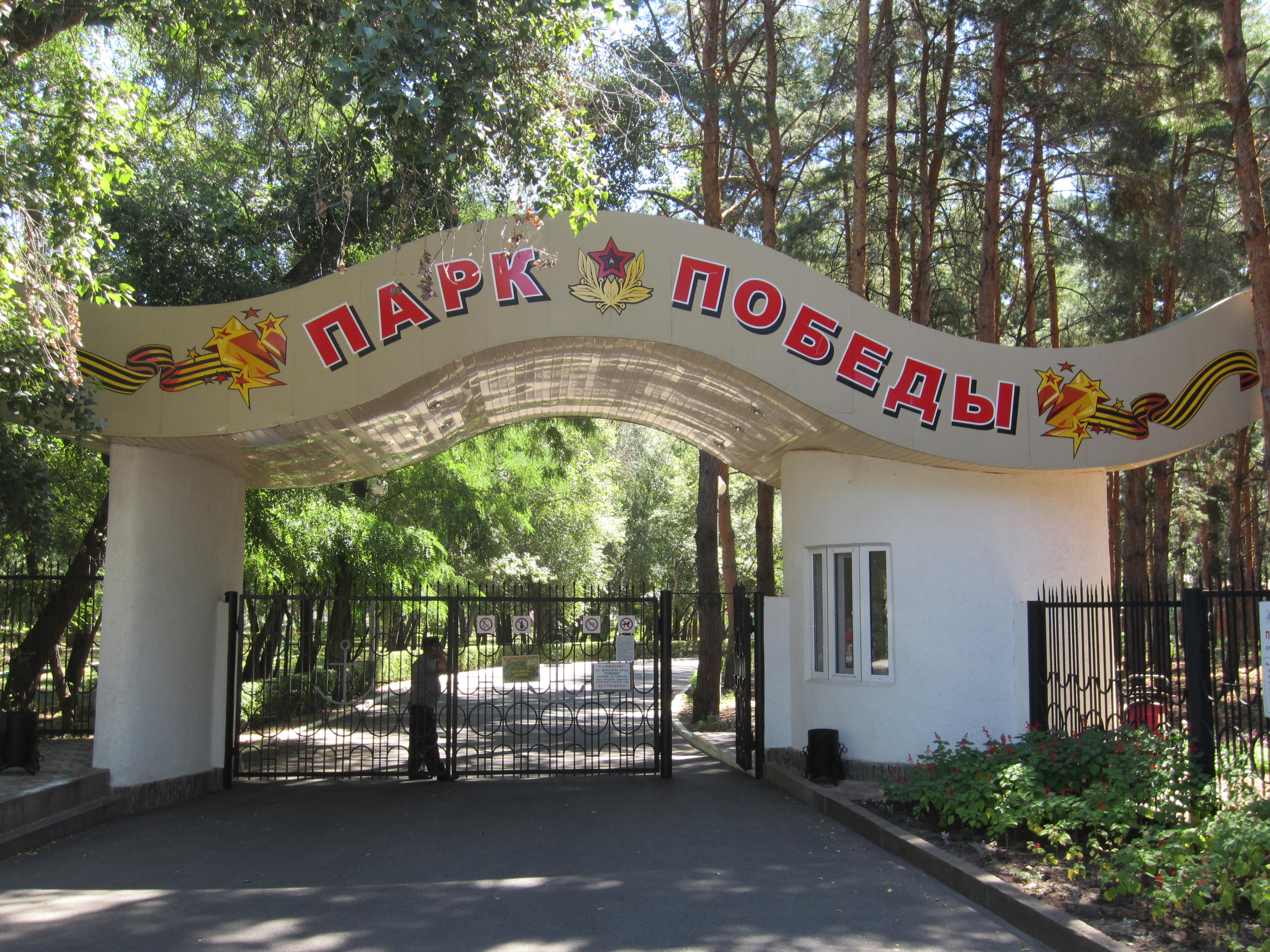
Victory Park

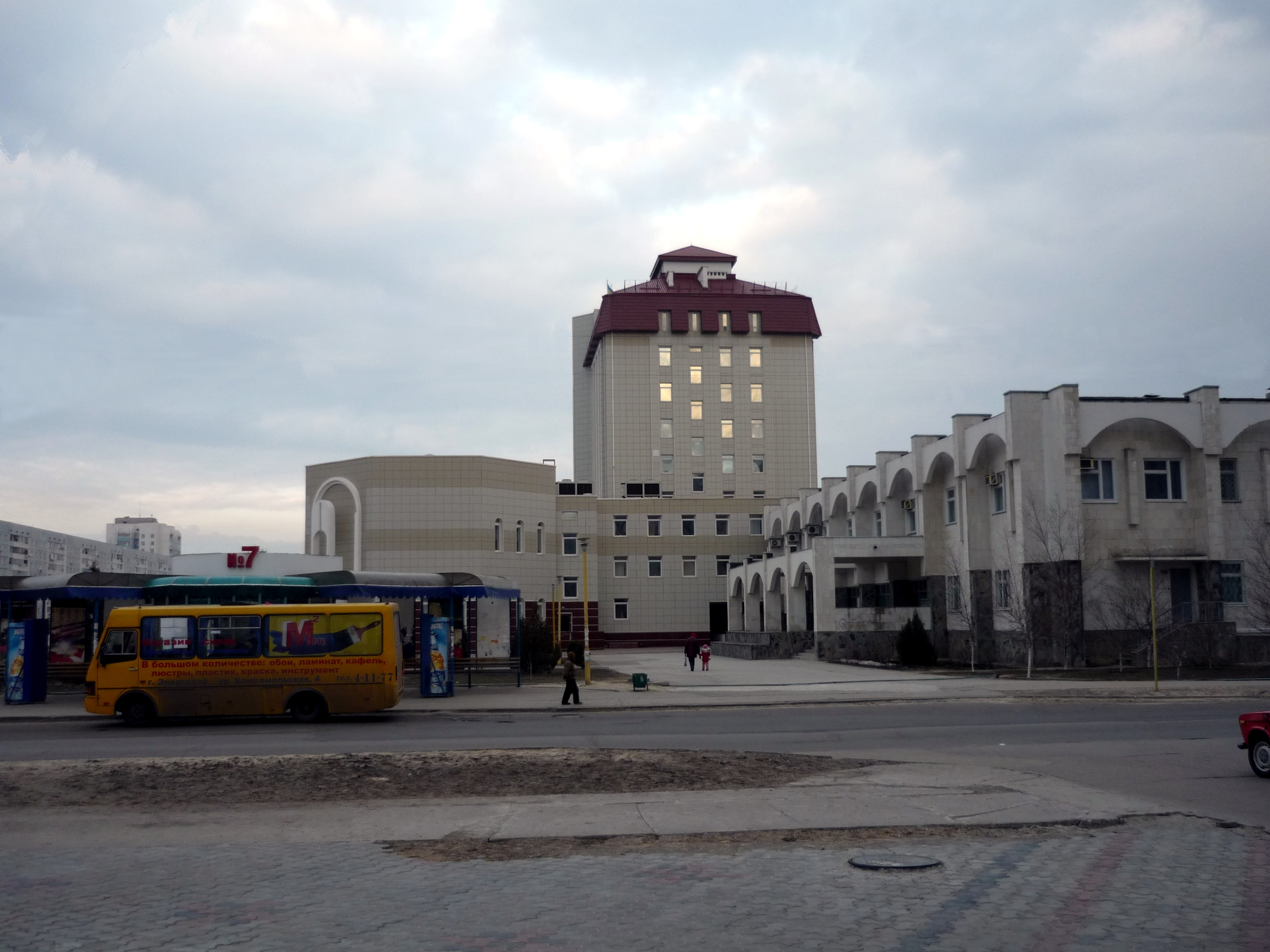
City Hall

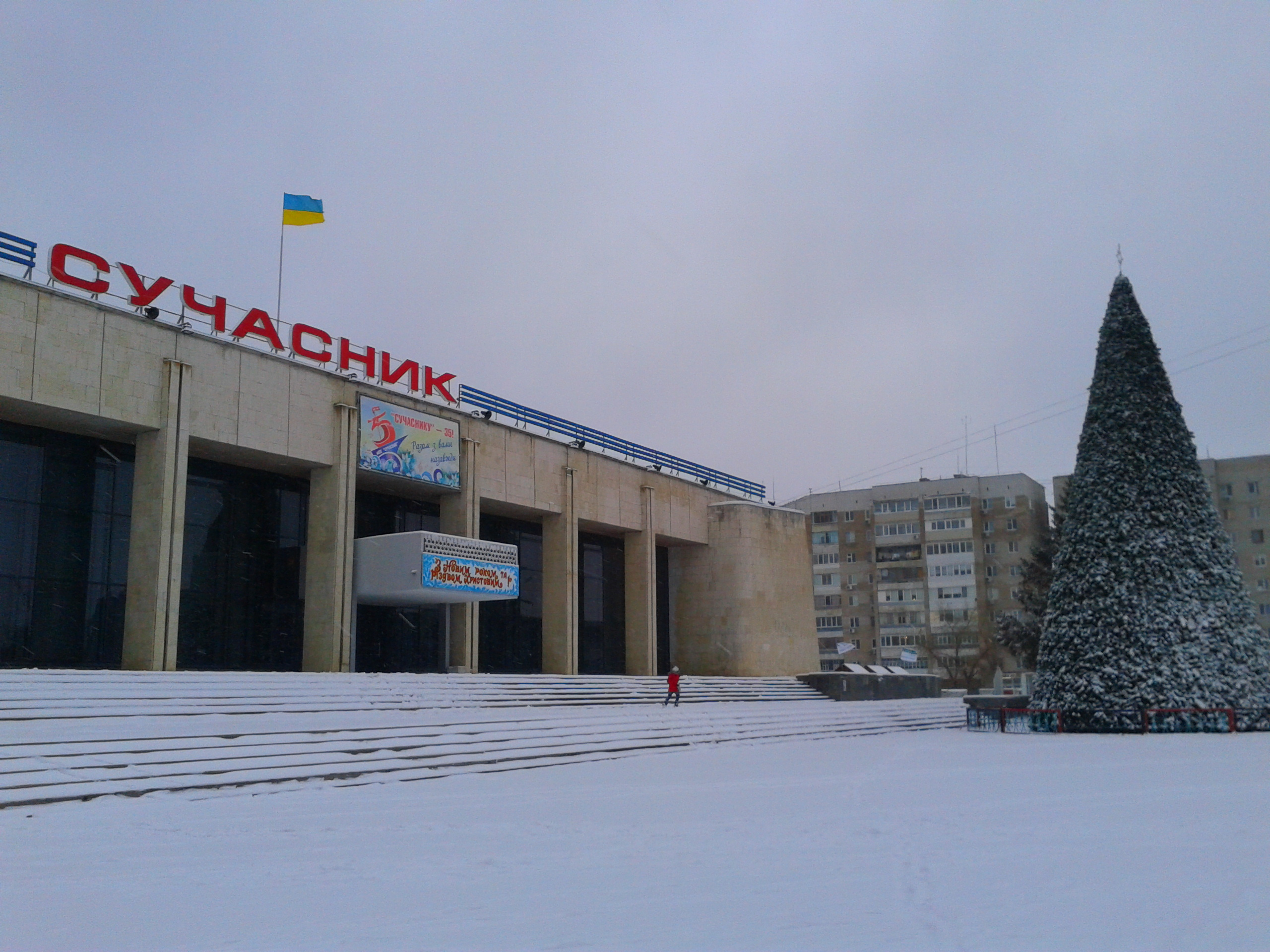
Suchasnyk Palace of Culture

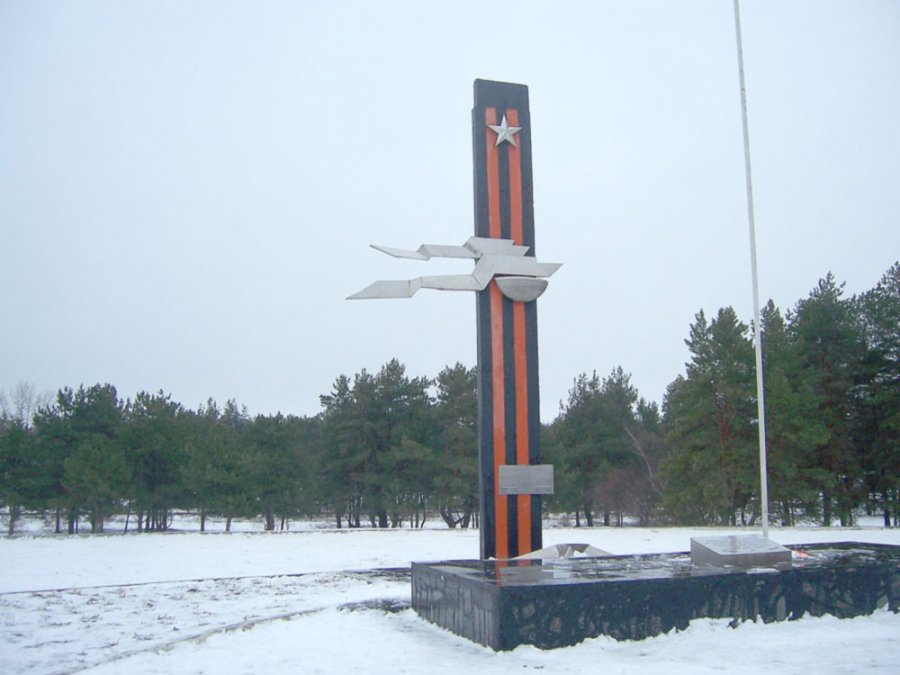
The Great Patriotic War memorial

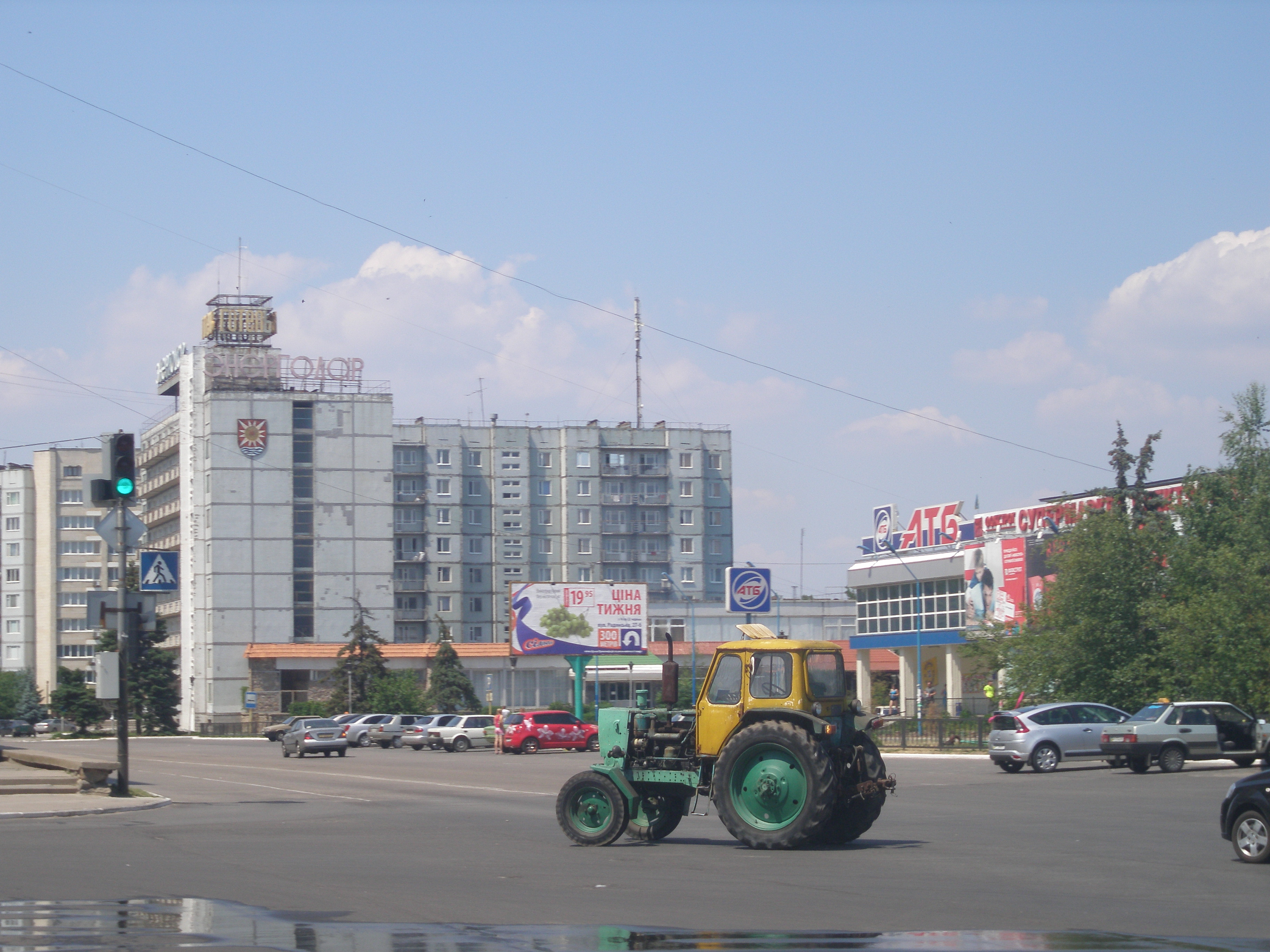
Enerhodar Hotel

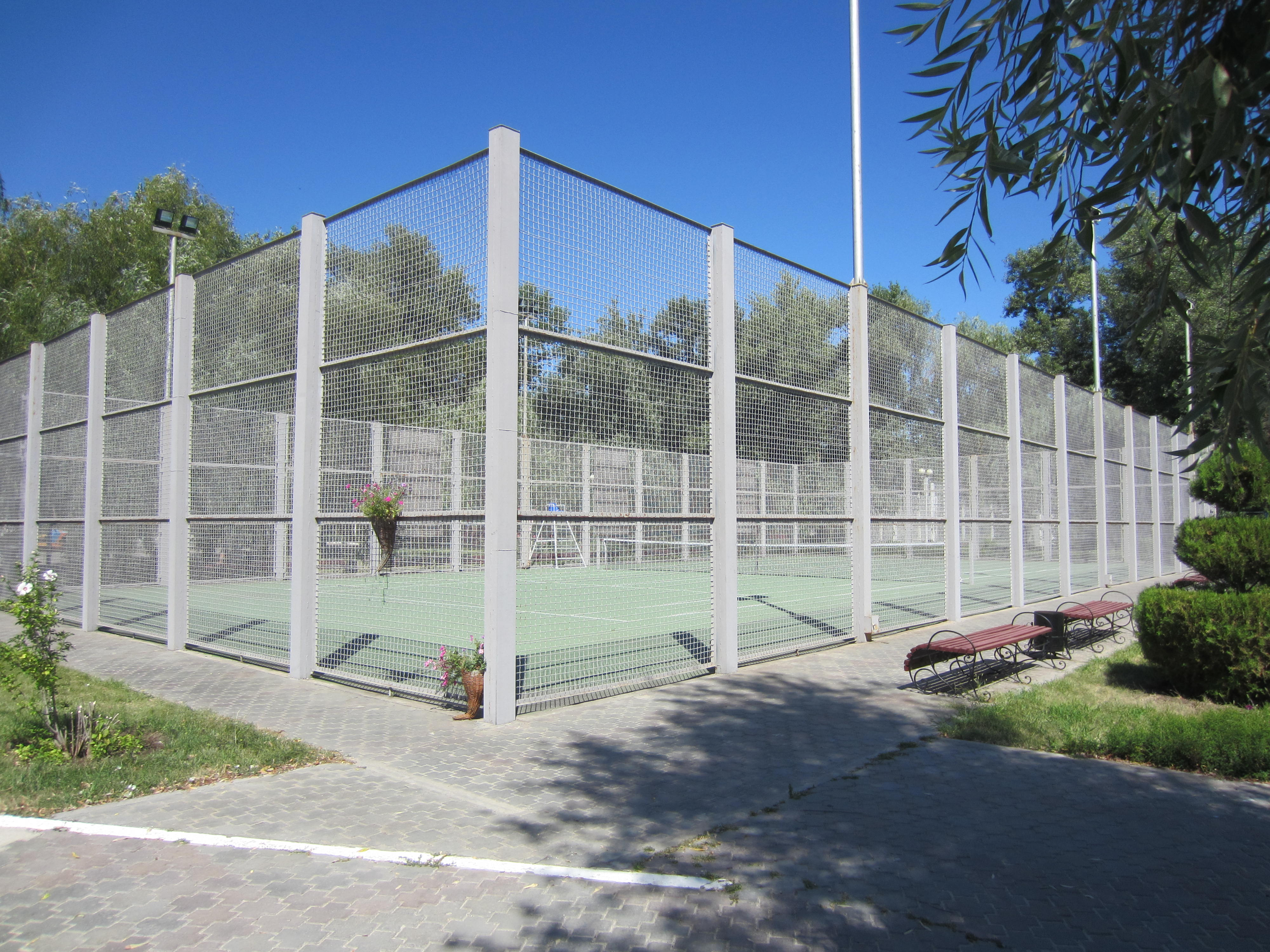
A tennis court

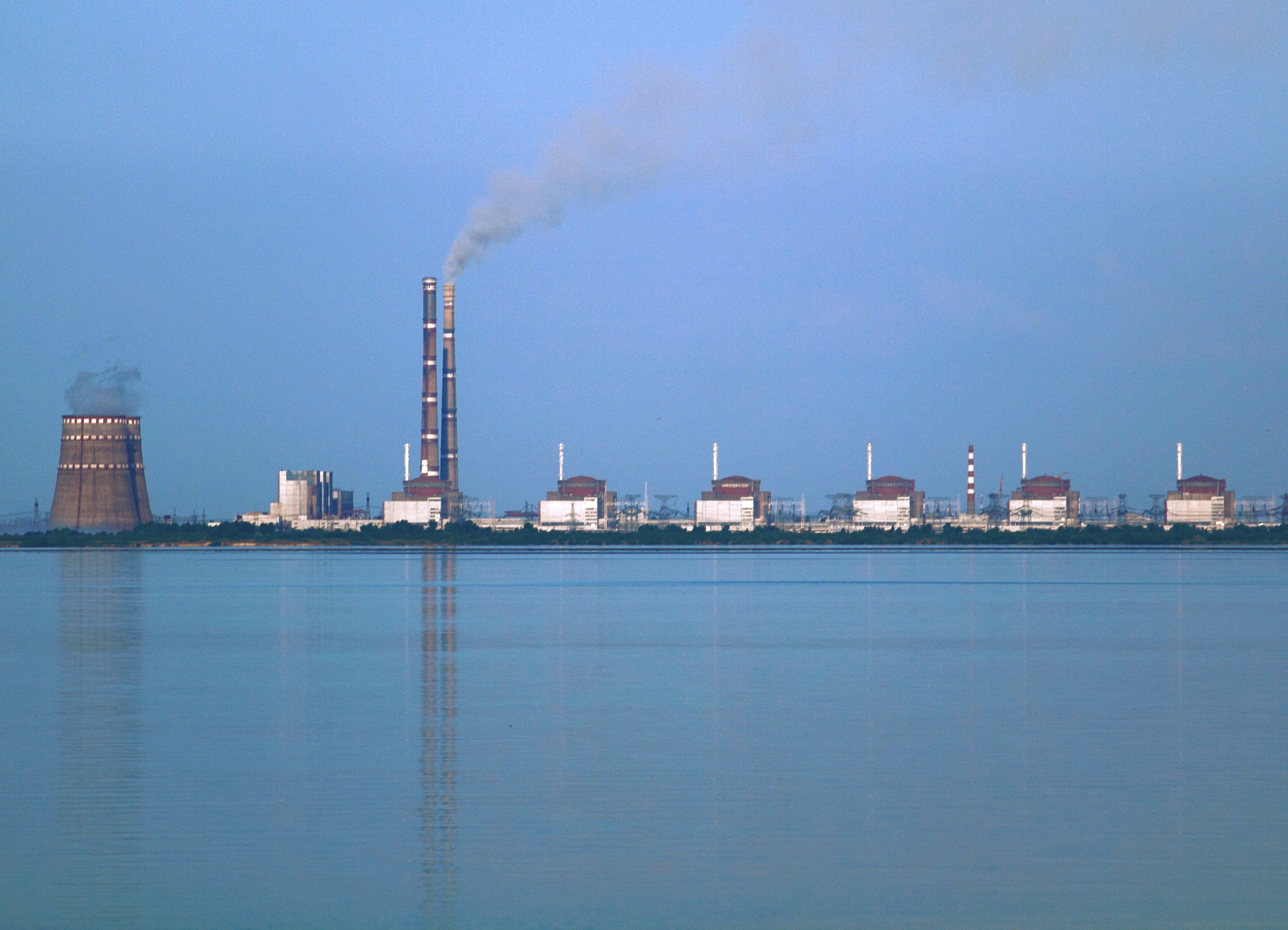
Zaporizhzhia Nuclear Power Plant

== Notable people ==
- Liudmyla Babak (born 1997), Ukrainian canoeist
- Valeriy Sydorenko (born 1976), Ukrainian boxer
- Volodymyr Sydorenko (born 1976), Ukrainian boxer
