= Chervonohryhorivka =

Rural locality in Dnipropetrovsk Oblast, Ukraine

Chervonohryhorivka Червоногригорівка
- Rural settlement
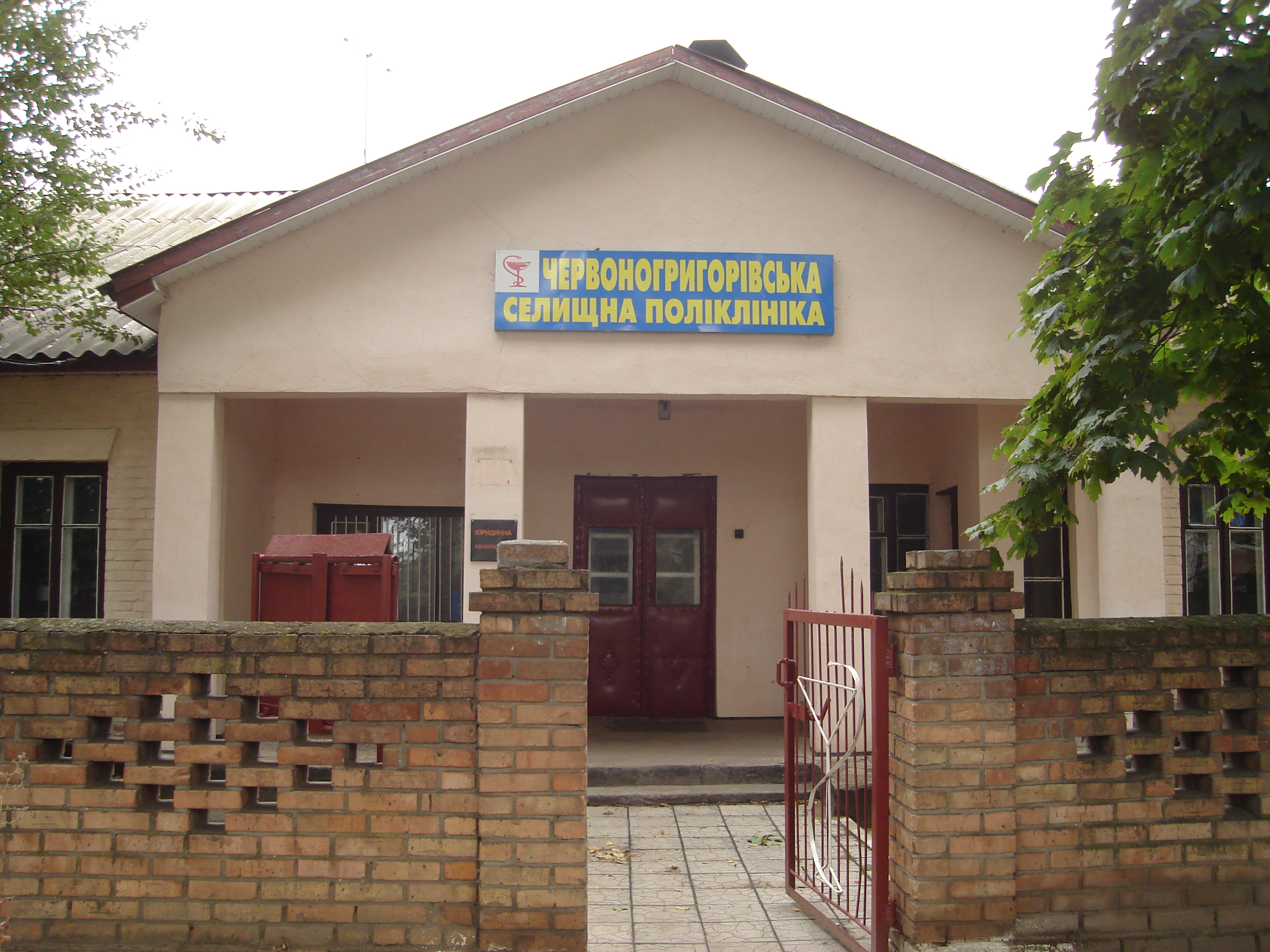

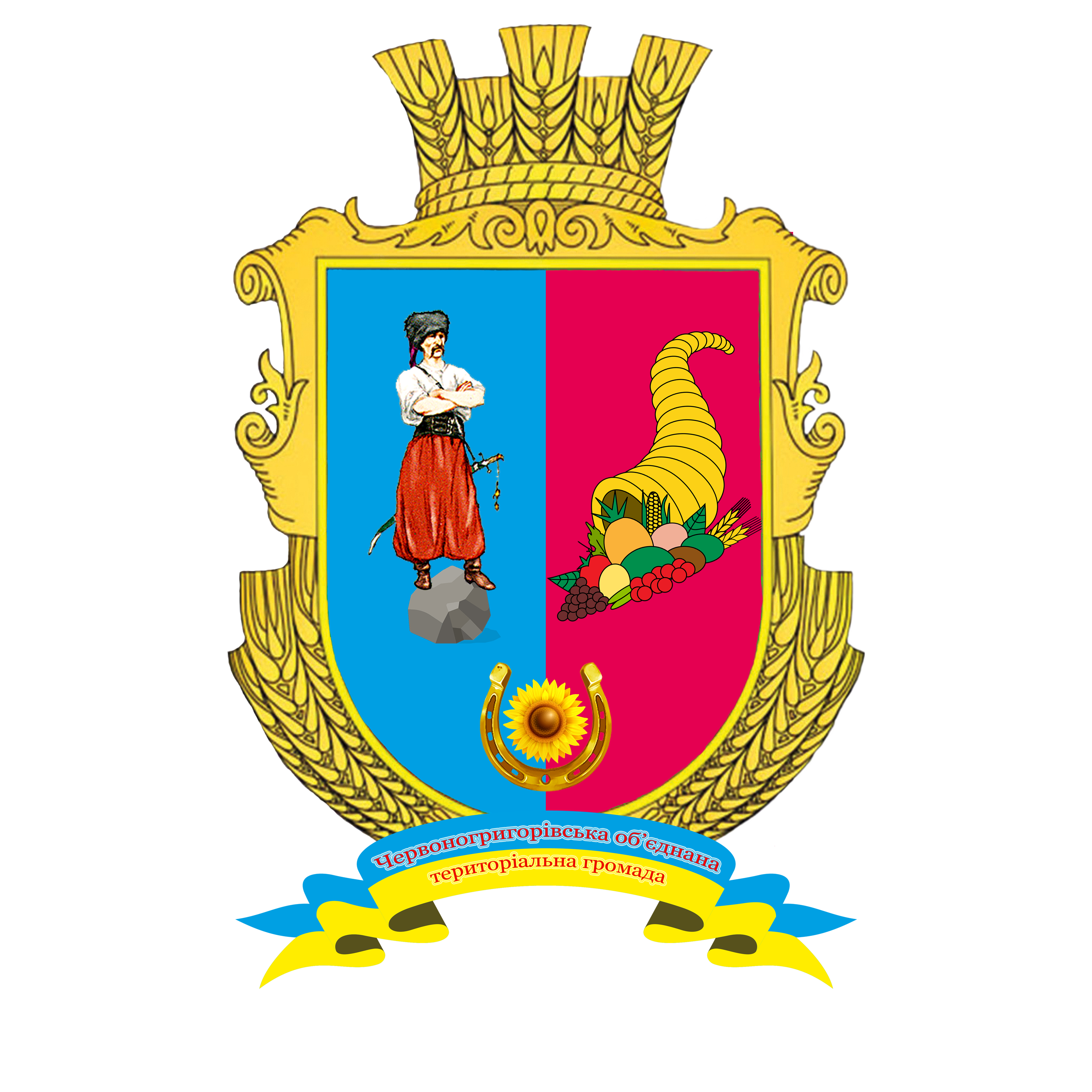
- Coat of arms

- Location in Dnipropetrovsk Oblast Location in Ukraine
- Coordinates: 47°37′08″N 34°30′21″E
- Country: Ukraine
- Oblast: Dnipropetrovsk Oblast
- Raion: Nikopol Raion

Population (2022)
  - Total: 6,030
  - Estimate (2025): 5,172
- Time zone: UTC+2 (EET)
  - Summer (DST): UTC+3 (EEST)

Chervonohryhorivka (Ukrainian: Червоногригорівка; Russian: Червоногригоровка) is a rural settlement in Nikopol Raion, Dnipropetrovsk Oblast, Ukraine. The settlement is located east of Nikopol on what used to be the right bank of the Kakhovka Reservoir. It hosts the administration of Chervonohryhorivka settlement hromada, one of the hromadas of Ukraine. Population: 6,030 (2022 estimate).

Until 26 January 2024, Chervonohryhorivka was designated urban-type settlement. On this day, a new law entered into force which abolished this status, and Chervonohryhorivka became a rural settlement.

== Economy ==
=== Transportation ===
Two stations on the railway connecting Nikopol and Zaporizhia, Revun and 111 km, are located in Chervonohryhorivka. There is infrequent passenger traffic.

Chervonohryhorivka has access to Highway H23 which connects Kryvyi Rih and Zaporizhia via Nikopol.

== Demographics ==
As of the 2001 Ukrainian census, Chervonohryhorivka had a population of 6,710 people. The native language composition was as follows:

First languages in Chervonohryhorivka
	percent
Ukrainian	92.9%
Russian	6.5%
Belarusian	0.2%
Hungarian	0.1%
others	0.1%
