= Marhanets urban hromada =

Municipality in Dnipropetrovsk Oblast, Ukraine

Marhanets urban hromada Марганецька міська громада
- Hromada
- Interactive map of Marhanets urban hromada
- Country: Ukraine
- Oblast: Dnipropetrovsk Oblast
- Raion: Nikopol Raion
- Admin. center: Marhanets

Area
  - Total: 201.32 km^{2} (77.73 sq mi)

Population (2018)
  - Total: 50,051
  - Density: 248.61/km^{2} (643.91/sq mi)
- CATOTTG code: UA12080010000029838
- Settlements: 8
- Cities: 1
- Rural settlements: 2
- Villages: 5
- Website: marganets-rada.dp.ua/ua/

Marhanets urban territorial hromada (Ukrainian: Марганецька міська територіальна громада, romanized: Marhanetska miska terytorialna hromada) is one of the hromadas of Ukraine, located in Nikopol Raion within Dnipropetrovsk Oblast. The administrative center is the city of Marhanets.

The area of the territory is 201.32 square kilometres (77.73 mi^{2}), the population of the hromada is 50,051 (2018).

== History ==
Formed on November 29, 2018, by merging the territories and settlements of Marhanets City and Novokyivka Village Councils of Verkhnodniprovsk Raion of Dnipropetrovsk Oblast.

In accordance with the Law of Ukraine "On Amendments to the Law of Ukraine "On Voluntary Association of Territorial Hromadas" regarding the voluntary accession of territorial hromadas of villages, settlements to territorial communities of cities of republican significance of the Autonomous Republic of Crimea, regional significance", communities formed as a result of the accession of adjacent communities to cities of regional significance are recognized as capable and do not require elections.

== Composition ==
In addition to one city (Marhanets), the hromada contains two rural settlements (Maksymivka and Mariivka) and 5 villages:

- Dobra Nadiia
- Hrushivka
- Novokamianka
- Novokyivka
- Vilne
