= Zaporizhzhia thermal power station =

Thermal power station in Enerhodar, Ukraine

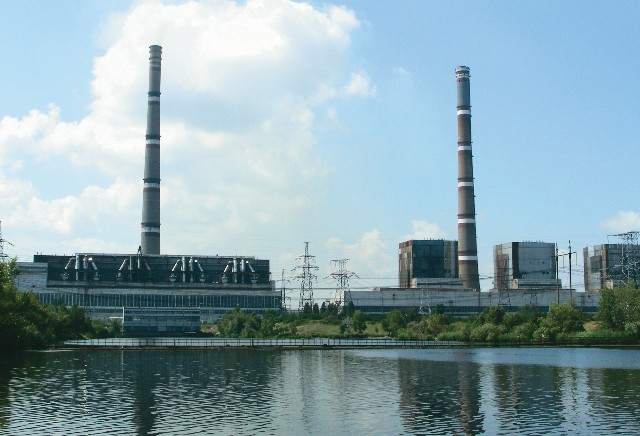
- 4 coal-fired (left) and 3 gas-fired (right) units in 2014
- Official name: Запорізька ТЕС
- Country: Ukraine
- Location: Enerhodar, Zaporizhzhia Oblast
- Coordinates: 47°30′31″N 34°37′32″E
- Status: Operational
- Construction began: 1971
- Commission date: 1972
- Owner: Dniproenergo
- Operator: DTEK
- Employees: 2,100 (2009)

Thermal power station
- Primary fuel: Coal
- Secondary fuel: Natural gas
- Tertiary fuel: Fuel oil

Power generation
- Units operational: 2 x 300 MW; 2 x 325 MW; 2 x 800 MW
- Make and model: TAGMET; Electrotyazhmash; LMZ; Electrosila
- Nameplate capacity: 2,850 MW
- Annual net output: 23,500 GWh (1978); 24,800 GWh (1986)

External links
- Website: dniproenergo.com.ua/separate-units/dtek-zaporizka-tpp/
- Commons: Related media on Commons

Zaporizhzhia thermal power station is a large thermal power plant (DRES) in the purpose-built city of Enerhodar in Ukraine. It is the most powerful thermal power station in Ukraine, with an installed capacity of 2,850 MWe. Its primary fuel is coal. It can also fire natural gas and fuel oil, and has tank storage for these reserve fuels adjacent to the coal bunkers.

== Operation ==
The plant was built by the Soviet Union between 1971 and 1977.

The first stage of this power plant with a capacity of 1200 MW began operation in 1973. In 1977, the second stage of the power plant with a capacity of, 2400 MW began operation. In 1986, the power plant produced a record amount of electricity and was awarded the Order of the October Revolution.

The plant has two 320-metre (1,050 ft) tall flue-gas stacks, which are among the tallest freestanding structures in Ukraine. The plant is not equipped with any flue gas desulphurization systems, and uses electrostatic precipitators to remove fly ash prior to the flue gas being exhausted via one of the two chimneys. Like many other coal-fired generating stations, the Zaporizhzhia site encompasses an ash pond. Coal ash from the boilers is delivered by pipe to the 135 hectare (333 acre) pond, where it is disposed of.

The plant supplies power to the southern regions of Ukraine. Some of the power is transmitted from its substation through the Enerhodar Dnipro Powerline Crossing to the north side of the Kakhovka Reservoir.

On 4 March 2022, the thermal plant and the adjacent Zaporizhzhia Nuclear Power Plant were captured by Russian forces during the Russian invasion of Ukraine. On 5 May 2022, the thermal power plant stopped operating after it ran out of coal, as it was unable to get further deliveries due to the invasion.

== Unit specifications ==
As of January 1, 2021, the installed capacity is 2,850 MW:

- 2 units (numbers 2 and 4) of 300 MW each with CCI-312 boilers and K-300-240-2 turbines
- 2 units (numbers 1 and 3) of 325 MW each with CCI-312 boilers and K-325-23.5 turbines
- 2 units (numbers 5 and 7) of 800 MW each with TGMP-204/Boilers and K-800-240-3 turbines, but not in operation

A third 800 MW unit (number 6) has been decommissioned.

A small 1 MW grid battery was added in 2021 to test grid services.

== 2021 accident ==
On February 3, 2021, the entire city of Enerhodar, as well as several neighboring towns, lost power. This was caused by an accident at the Zaporizhzhia thermal power station, where, according to the officials, power output of the plant's units dropped to zero.

According to Centrenergo, the plant's operator:

The accident was caused by an emergency shutdown of power unit No. 1 of Zaporizhzhya thermal power plant and No. 9 of Kurakhovskaya thermal power plant due to damage to the heating surface of the boiler unit. Now the power engineers are eliminating the violations and after the repair they promise to resume the operation of the energy system. Such a technological disruption is not uncommon for any thermal generation, especially during periods of high load.

In order to balance the system, power unit No. 10 of the Krivorozhskaya TPP was taken out of repair ahead of schedule. At the command of NEC Ukrenergo, power units No. 9 and 12 of Burshtynskaya TPP and No. 7 of Dobrotvorskaya TPP were synchronized to the grid and began supplying power.

== See also ==
- List of power stations in Ukraine
