= Nikopol Raion =

Subdivision of Dnipropetrovsk Oblast, Ukraine

Nikopol Raion Нікопольський район
- Raion
- Nikopolskyi raion
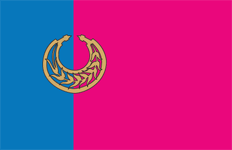
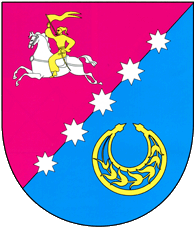
- Flag Coat of arms

- Coordinates: 47°37′23″N 34°31′57.6″E
- Country: Ukraine
- Oblast: Dnipropetrovsk Oblast
- Admin. center: Nikopol
- Subdivisions: 8 hromadas

Area
  - Total: 3,240.4 km^{2} (1,251.1 sq mi)

Population (2022)
  - Total: 250,746
  - Density: 77.381/km^{2} (200.42/sq mi)
- Time zone: UTC+02:00 (EET)
  - Summer (DST): UTC+03:00 (EEST)
- Area code: +380

Nikopol Raion (Ukrainian: Нікопольський район, romanized: Nikopolskyi raion) is a raion (district) of Dnipropetrovsk Oblast, Ukraine. Its administrative center is the city of Nikopol. Population: 250,746 (2022 estimate).

On 18 July 2020, as part of the administrative reform of Ukraine, the number of raions of Dnipropetrovsk Oblast was reduced to seven, and the area of Nikopol Raion was significantly expanded. One abolished raion, Tomakivka Raion, Marhanets and Pokrov Municipalities, as well as the city of Nikopol, which was previously incorporated as a city of oblast significance and did not belong to the raion, were merged into Nikopol Raion. The area of the raion before expansion was 1,940 square kilometres (750 mi^{2}) (second largest among all the raions of Dnipropetrovsk Oblast). The January 2020 estimate of the raion population was 38,879 (2020 est.).

The southern border of the raion is by the Kakhovka Reservoir by the Dnieper River.

== Subdivisions ==
=== Current ===
After the reform in July 2020, the raion consisted of eight hromadas:

- Chervonohryhorivka settlement hromada with the administration in the rural settlement of Chervonohryhorivka, retained from Nikopol Raion;
- Marhanets urban hromada with the administration in the city of Marhanets, transferred from Marhanets Municipality;
- Myrove rural hromada with the administration in the settlement of Myrove, transferred from Tomakivka Raion;
- Nikopol urban hromada with the administration in the city of Nikopol, transferred from the city of oblast significance of Nikopol;
- Pershotravneve rural hromada with the administration in the selo of Mozolevske, retained from Nikopol Raion;
- Pokrov urban hromada with the administration in the city of Pokrov, transferred from Pokrov Municipality;
- Pokrovske rural hromada with the administration in the selo of Pokrovske, retained from Nikopol Raion;
- Tomakivka settlement hromada with the administration in the rural settlement of Tomakivka, transferred from Tomakivka Raion.

=== Before 2020 ===
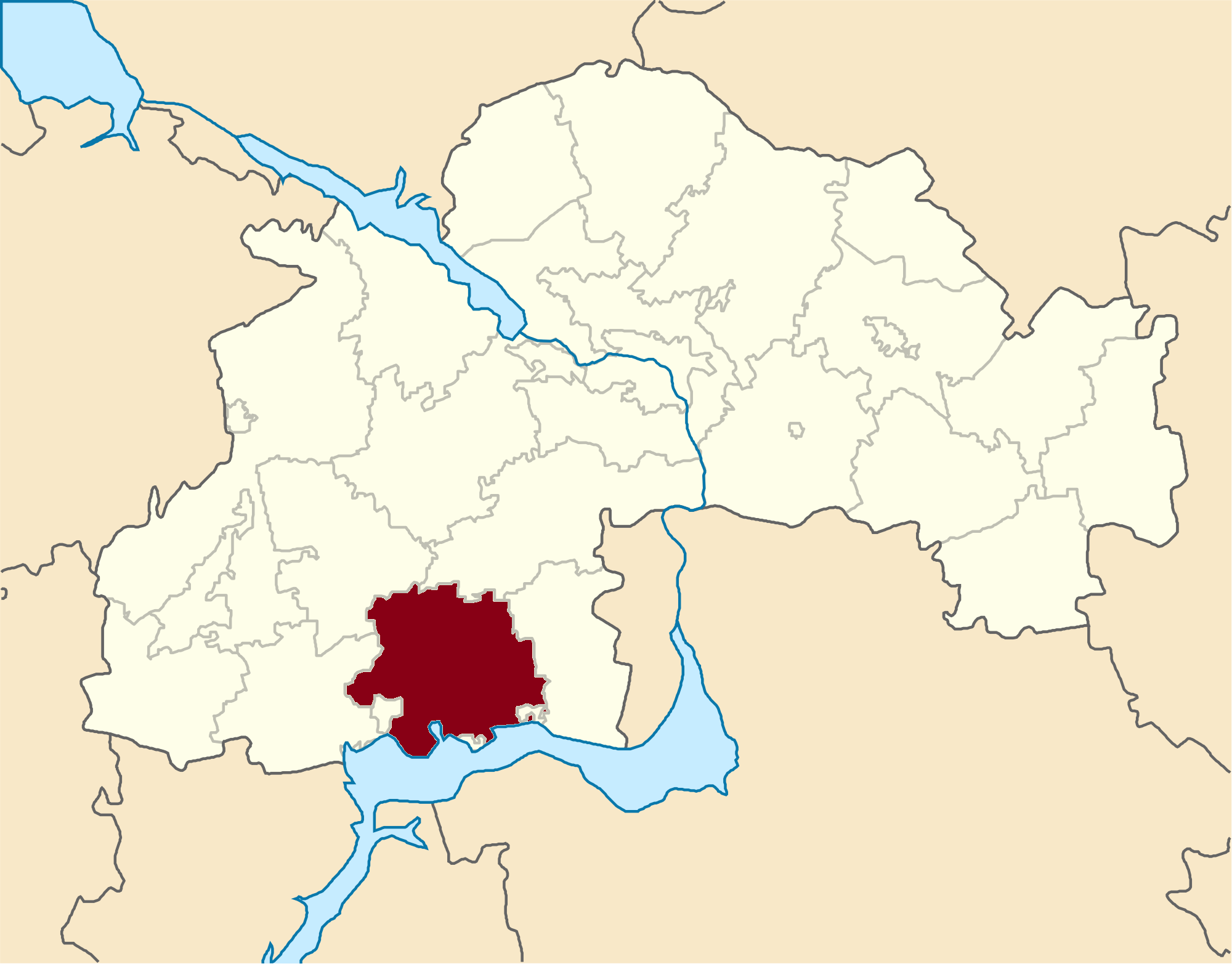
Nikopol Raion in Dnipropetrovsk Oblast before 2020

Before the 2020 reform, the raion consisted of three hromadas:

- Chervonohryhorivka settlement hromada with the administration in Chervonohryhorivka;
- Pershotravneve rural hromada with the administration in Pershotravneve;
- Pokrovske rural hromada with the administration in Pokrovske.
