= Marhanets =

City in Dnipropetrovsk Oblast, Ukraine

Marhanets Марганець
- City
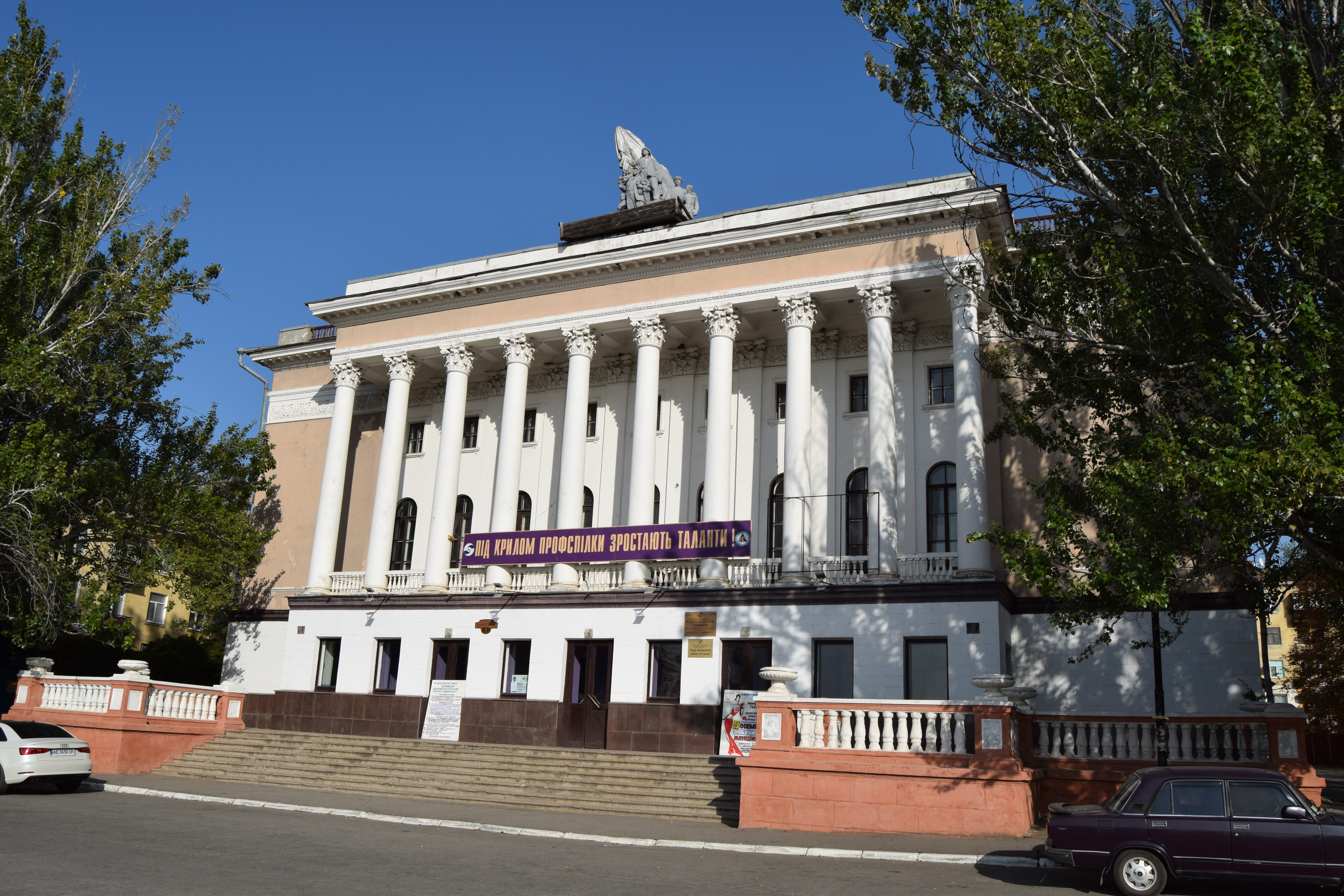
- Palace of Culture

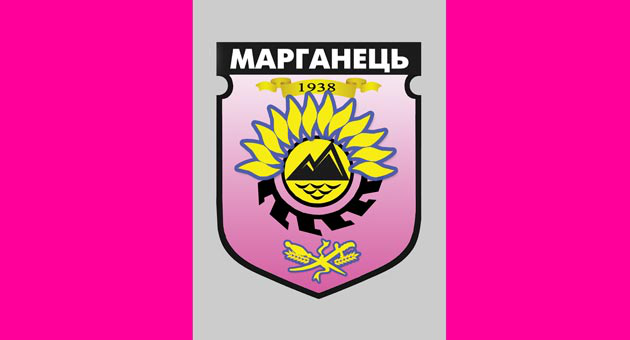
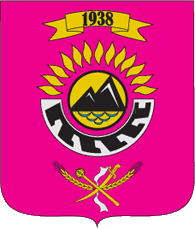
- Flag Seal
- Interactive map of Marhanets
- Location in Ukraine Marhanets (Dnipropetrovsk Oblast)
- Coordinates: 47°38′41″N 34°36′15″E
- Country: Ukraine
- Oblast: Dnipropetrovsk Oblast
- Raion: Nikopol Raion
- Hromada: Marhanets urban hromada
- Founded: 1938

Area
  - Total: 37 km^{2} (14 sq mi)
- Elevation: 30 m (98 ft)

Population (2022)
  - Total: 44,980
  - Density: 1,200/km^{2} (3,100/sq mi)
- Time zone: UTC+2 (EET)
  - Summer (DST): UTC+3 (EEST)
- Postal code: 53400-53490
- Area code: +380-5665
- Website: marganets-rada.dp.ua

Marhanets (Ukrainian: Марганець [ˈmɑrɦɐnetsʲ], lit. 'Manganese') is a city in Nikopol Raion, Dnipropetrovsk Oblast, Ukraine. The city is located on the right bank of the Dnieper River near the former Kakhovka Reservoir (destroyed during the Russian invasion of Ukraine in 2023), at the river's confluence with Tomakivka. Marhanets hosts the administration of Marhanets urban hromada, one of the hromadas of Ukraine. Its population is approximately 44,980 (2022 estimate).

It was established in 1938 in place of the village of Horodyshche, a manganese mining town which was called Komintern from 1926 to 1938.

== History ==
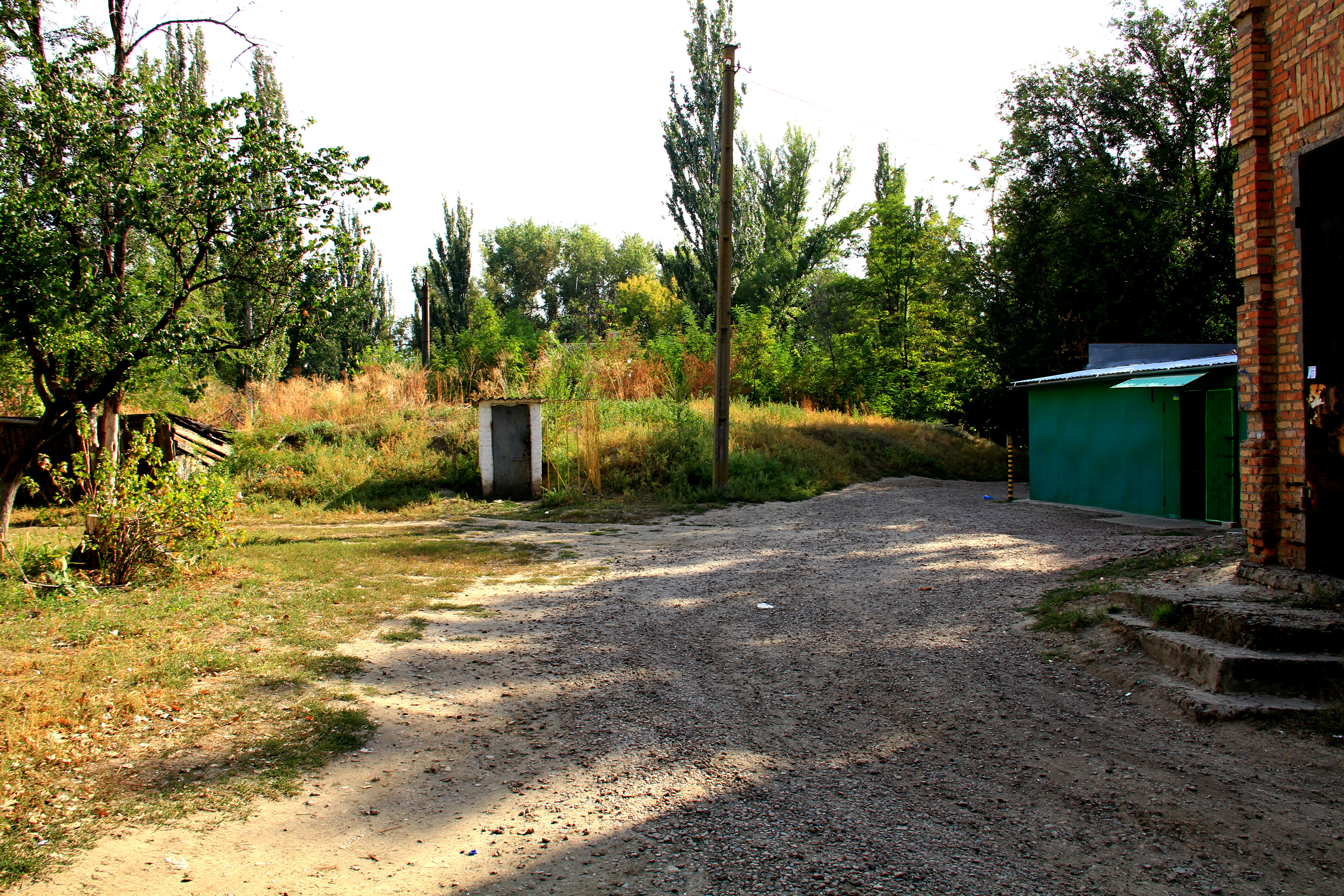
Ancient mound in Marhanets

The Cossack Fort of Tomakivka Sich was located near the site of the city in the 16th century, but was destroyed by Tatars soon after the Kosiński Uprising.

During World War II, Marhanets was under German occupation from 17 August 1941 until 5 February 1944. It was administered as a part of Reichskommissariat Ukraine. The Germans operated a forced labour camp in the town.

On October 12, 2010, at least 43 people died in the Marhanets train accident.

Until 18 July 2020, Marhanets was incorporated as a city of oblast significance and the center of Marhanets Municipality. The municipality was abolished in July 2020 as part of the administrative reform of Ukraine, which reduced the number of raions of Dnipropetrovsk Oblast to seven. The area of Marhanets Municipality was merged into Nikopol Raion.

=== Russian invasion of Ukraine ===
On April 23, 2025, a Russian drone strike targeted a bus transporting workers in the city. The attack killed nine people and injured 49 others, according to regional governor Serhiy Lysak. The strike occurred amid broader Russian drone attacks across Ukraine and during ongoing international ceasefire discussions in London.

== Demographics ==
As of the 2001 Ukrainian census, Marhanets had a population of 50,443 inhabitants. The ethnic and linguistic composition of the city as of the census was as follows:

Ethnic groups in Marhanets
	percent
Ukrainians	77.46%
Russians	19.85%
Belarusians	0.82%
Armenians	0.57%
Germans	0.15%
Azerbaijanis	0.12%
others	1.03%

Languages in Marhanets
	percent
Ukrainian	71.8%
Russian	27.0%
Armenian	0.2%
Belarusian	0.2%
others	0.2%
