= Pokrov, Ukraine =

City in Dnipropetrovsk Oblast, Ukraine

Pokrov Покров
- City
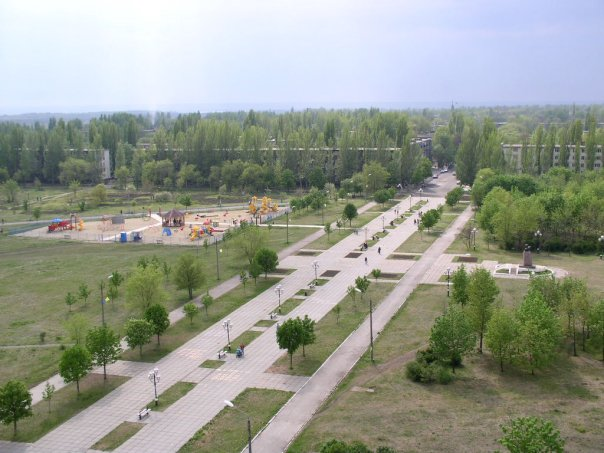
- Skyline of Pokrov

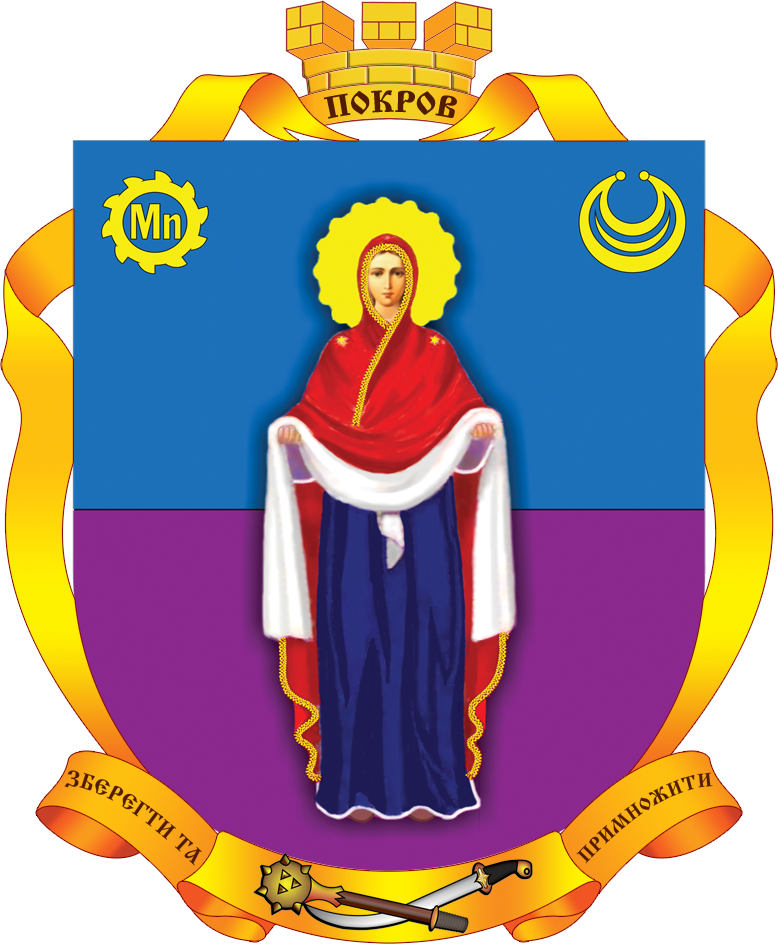
- Flag Coat of arms
- Interactive map of Pokrov
- Location within Ukraine Location within Dnipropetrovsk Oblast
- Coordinates: 47°39′12″N 34°5′3″E
- Country: Ukraine
- Oblast: Dnipropetrovsk Oblast
- Raion: Nikopol Raion
- Hromada: Pokrov urban hromada
- First settled: 1883

Area
  - Total: 26 km^{2} (10 sq mi)
- Elevation: 71 m (233 ft)

Population (2022)
  - Total: 37,493
  - Density: 1,400/km^{2} (3,700/sq mi)
- Postal code: 53300-53390
- Website: https://pkrv.dp.gov.ua

Pokrov (Ukrainian: Покров, IPA: [poˈkrɔu̯]), formerly Ordzhonikidze (Орджонікідзе) until 2016, is a small city and mining town in Nikopol Raion, Dnipropetrovsk Oblast, central Ukraine. It hosts the administration of Pokrov urban hromada, one of the hromadas of Ukraine. Its population is approximately 37,493 (2022 estimate).

== History ==
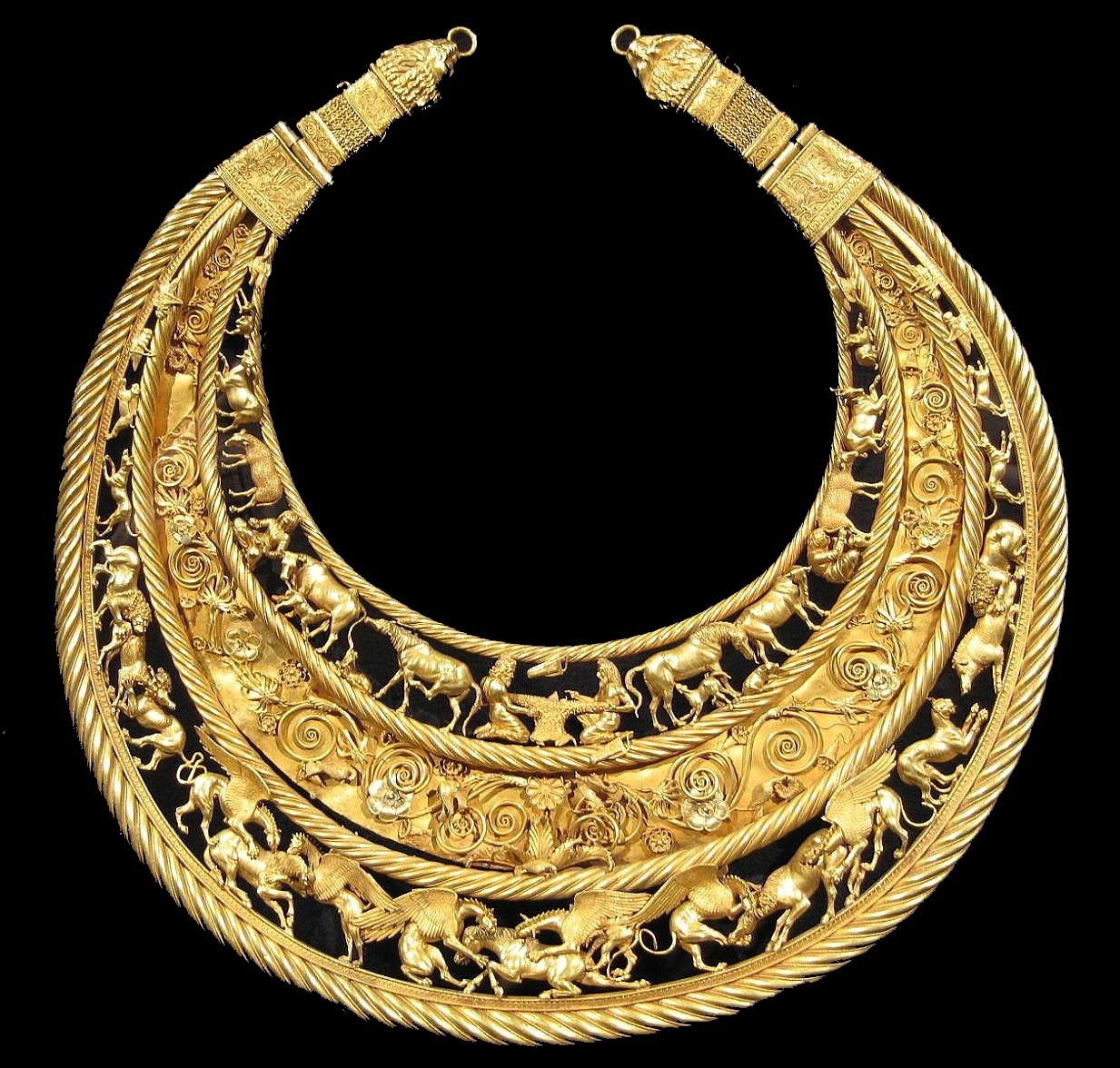
Scythian Golden Pectoral found near Pokrov

During the industrialization of the Soviet Union, the development of the mining industry intensified, Ordzhonikidze became a notable mining town in Soviet Ukraine.

On 22 October 1938, Ordzhonikidze, named after Sergo Ordzhonikidze, received the urban-type settlement status.

In 1971, a large Golden Pectoral was discovered on the site of Tovsta Mohyla near Pokrov by the Ukrainian archaeologist Borys Mozolevskyi. It probably belonged to a Scythian chieftain of the 3rd century BC, but was likely made by Greek artisans of the Crimean peninsula.

The city was established in 1956 when several miner settlements of the Ordzhonikidze Mine were merged into a city. Previously, in 1883 a Russian engineer-geologist Valerian Domger discovered rich deposits of manganese ore in a basin of the Solona River. Since that time, mining towns such as Prychepylivka (today – Hirnytske) started to appear in the area. In 1886, in place of the modern city were created Pokrovski quarries. Pokrov is located on the site of the 17th century Chortomlyk Sich.

On 15 May 2015, President of Ukraine Petro Poroshenko signed a bill into law that started a six months period for the removal of communist monuments and the mandatory renaming of settlements with a name related to Communism. Since 2 April 2016, after it was officially renamed by the Ukrainian parliament, the city is officially named Pokrov.

Until 18 July 2020, Pokrov was incorporated as a city of oblast significance and the center of Pokrov Municipality. The municipality was abolished in July 2020 as part of the administrative reform of Ukraine, which reduced the number of raions of Dnipropetrovsk Oblast to seven. The area of Pokrov Municipality was merged into Nikopol Raion.

== Demographics ==
As of the 2001 Ukrainian census, Pokrov had a population of 46,654. Ethnic Ukrainians account for over 70% of the town's population. Russians, Belarusians and Germans constitute sizeable minorities.

Ethnic groups in Pokrov
	percent
Ukrainians	75.27%
Russians	22.05%
Belarusians	0.82%
Germans	0.57%
Armenians	0.25%
Moldovans	0.15%
Tatars	0.12%
Azerbaijanis	0.08%
Gypsies	0.06%

== Notable people ==
- Dasha Astafieva (born 1985), model and January 2009 Playboy Playmate
- Mykola Fedorenko (born 1955), football coach and player
- Serhiy Lavrynenko (born 1975), football player and coach
- Oleh Taran (born 1960), football player and coach

== Gallery ==
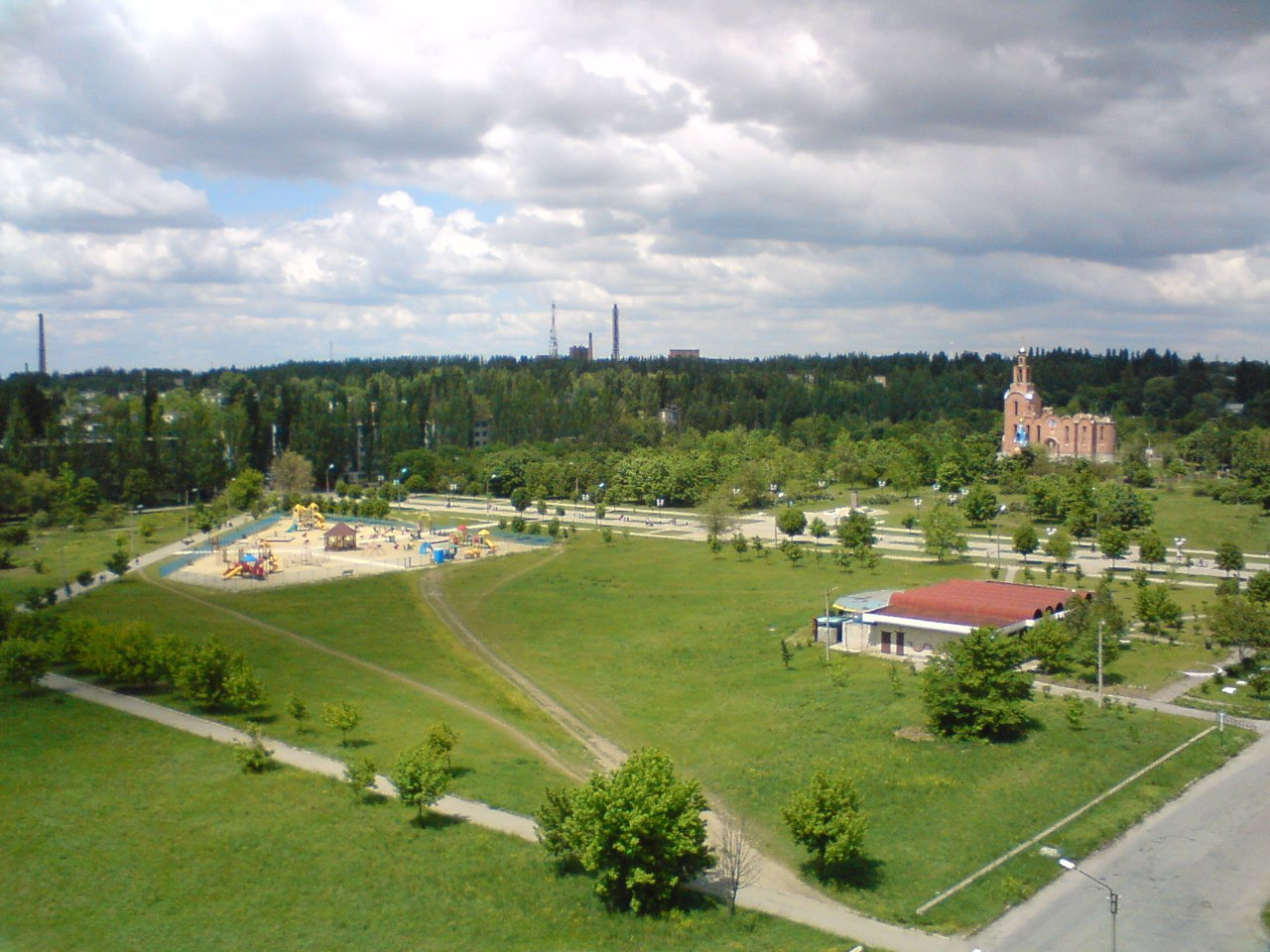
Pokrov park

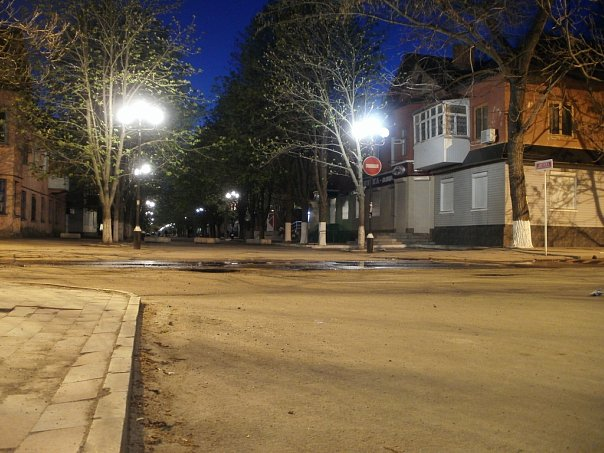
Downtown

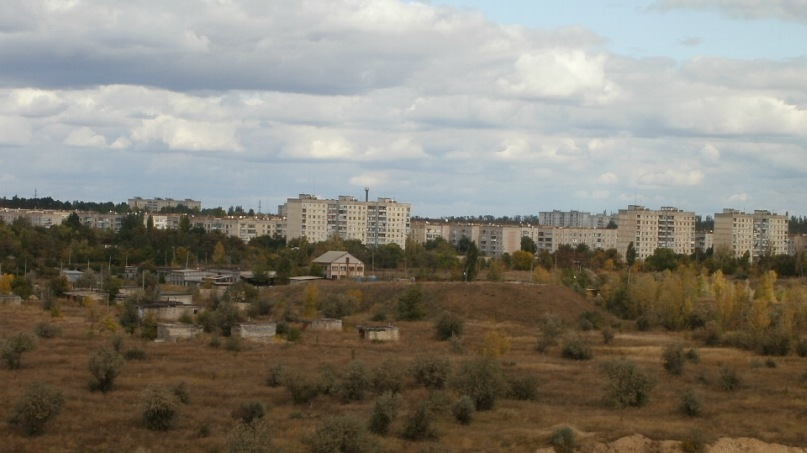
Apartment blocks

== See also ==
- Privat Group (corporation in control of the city's industry)
