= Privat Group =

Global business group based in Ukraine

The Privat Group, or PrivatBank Group (Ukrainian: Група «Приват», romanized: Hrupa "Pryvat") is a global business group, based in Ukraine. Privat Group controls thousands of companies of virtually every industry in Ukraine, the European Union, Georgia, Ghana, Russia, the United States, and other countries. Steel, oil & gas, chemical and energy are sectors of the group's prime influence and expertise. None of the group's capital is publicly traded on any stock exchange.

The business group was grouped around PrivatBank. On 18 December 2016 this bank was nationalized by the government of Ukraine, taking 100% ownership.

The group was founded and is controlled by the billionaire businessmen Hennadiy Boholyubov, Oleksiy Martynov, and Ihor Kolomoyskyi (the latter is the richest and leading partner that is best known to the public).

As a business-oligarch entity, Privat Group controls some prominent Ukrainian media, maintains close relations with politicians, and sponsors professional sports.

Key businesses of the group (as well as nationalized PrivatBank itself) are based in Dnipropetrovsk Oblast. The group's founding owners, natives of Dnipro, made their entire careers there.

== History ==
In 1990, the graduates of the Dnipropetrovsk universities, Gennadiy Bogolyubov, Ihor Kolomoyskyi and Oleksiy Martynov, created the first joint business: Bogolyubov and Kolomoisky bought the office equipment in Moscow, and Martynov was engaged in its marketing in Dnipro. After the collapse of the USSR, friends returned to Dnipropetrovsk and began to import various goods - from sneakers and sportswear to telephones. At this stage, they had a fourth partner, the son of a major Soviet entrepreneur, Leonid Miloslavsky. Each of the partners owned 25% in the total business. To pay for imported goods, the partners set up the export of steel products, Kolomoisky was in charge of this. Soon they realized that it was more profitable to trade the metal, and then they started to import oil products and began to buy the premises for their storage and transportation. They also took up the ferroalloy direction: the group supplied fuel to the Pokrovsky (Ordzhonikidzevsky) GOK, receiving in return manganese ore and sending it for export; Martynov was responsible for this direction.

In 1992, Serhiy Tihipko, the former head of the Dnipropetrovsk Komsomol Party, suggested to Miloslavsky to set up a bank. Kolomoisky initially opposed this idea, but eventually agreed [2]. In March 1992, four companies — Vist LLC, Sentosa LLC, Som LLC, and Privat-Intertreyding CJSC — established Privatbank CJSC. Tigipko became chairman of the board, and Miloslavsky headed the supervisory board. Unlike state-owned banks, Privat willingly served private entrepreneurs. 1995 became the crucial year for the Privatbank Group business when the bank have joined voucher privatization.

Having accumulated 1.2 million certificates (2.3% of their total number), the bank began to purchase the shares of the metallurgical enterprises. The first company whose shares Privat received in exchange for certificates was the Dnipropetrovsk hardware plant. With the help of vouchers, Privat entered the capital and established operational control over the Nikopol Ferroalloy Plant, Pokrovsky (Ordzhonikidze) and Marganets GOKs.

Gennady Bogolyubov later admitted that Privat had to negotiate with the governor of the Dnipropetrovsk region Pavlo Lazarenko. So, in 1996, to the Lazarenko’s driver, Leonid Gadyatsky, were rewritten 16.7% of the Privat key company - Sentosa Ltd, 14% of the Solm company, which owned the third part of the Privatbank, and at minimum 1% of the Privat intertrading".

In 1997, Lazarenko, who had already become the prime minister, was dismissed, and Miloslavsky died of a heart attack while on holiday in Austria. The share of Miloslavsky was inherited by his daughter Marianna, who was just finishing the school.

In 1999–2003, Privat's structure bought about 40% of Ukrnafta shares on the open market, the controlling stake remained with the government. Thanks to Kolomoisky’s acquaintance with the brothers Hryhoriy and Ihor Surkis and Viktor Medvedchuk, the company’s chairman was dismissed and replaced by Kolomoisky’s appointee.

In 2000, with the help of Hennadiy Korban, Privat was able to establish control over the Kalinin coke-chemical plant, the owner of which did not cooperate with the group. Korban, whose company kept the register of shareholders of the coke, through the courts canceled the transaction, which allowed his owner to collect a controlling stake.

In the late 1990s, Igor Kolomoisky and Victor Pinchuk, who owned large stakes in the NZF, Pokrovsky (Ordzhonikidze) GOK and MGOK, agreed to work together in the ferroalloy market, but soon they quarreled. In 2003, Pinchuk acquired a controlling stake in the NFP during the auction, to which no one else was allowed. After the change of power, in 2006, Pinchuk ceded control over the NFP and received in return 25% in the Privat ferroalloy business.

At the end of 2007, Kolomoisky sold to Evraz the controlling stakes of the six metallurgical enterprises. Privat received $1 billion and 9.72% of Evraz shares. However, two years later, Bogolyubov was removed from the board of directors of Evraz.

As of 2024, the Group has more than 19 million active customers.

== Assets ==
=== Metallurgy ===
Privat-Intertreyding is controlling the Pokrovsky, Marganetsky, Yuzhny (together with the Russian Smart Group) mining and processing plants. In metallurgy, is controlling the Dnipropetrovsk Metallurgical Plant of Comintern, Dnipropetrovsk Metallurgical Plant of Petrovsky, Nikopol Ferroalloy Plant, Stakhanov Ferroalloy Plant, Zaporizhzhia Ferroalloy Plant and Russian Alapaevsk Metallurgical Plant.

At the end of 2007, Privat completed the sale of its metallurgical assets to the Russian Evraz group: the Sukhaya Balka mining and processing plant, the Dnipropetrovsk Metallurgical Plant of Petrovsky and three coke chemicals (Dneprodzerzhinsky Coke and Chemical Plant, Baglecox, Dneprokoks).

=== Fuel industry ===
Kolomoisky was a major shareholder of Ukrnafta (42% of shares in 2008). At the end of December 2007, Privat acquired 12.62% of the shares of the British oil and gas company JKX Oil & Gas, about 80% of oil and gas assets are located in Ukraine.

== Structure ==
The businesses of Privat Group are not formally included in a corporation, and its top managers sometimes state that there is no such group at all. However, either PrivatBank or "Privat-Intertrading" company indirectly own all companies regarded as parts of the group. Typically, industrial companies are controlled through a complicated chain of offshore companies. Despite this, the Ukrainian public has a clear understanding of what exactly belongs to the group. To describe such relations, the media use the wording “company X is controlled by the Privat Group" or "the business of the X company is being organized by the PrivatBank". The group never denies such statements.

=== Steel industry ===
Various steel companies form the core of the Privat Group, presenting a full manufacturing chain of metallurgy. This oldest and most important part of the group is mostly located in and around Dnipro (location specified in parenthesises below).

==== Ore mining and processing companies ====
- Marhanets GOK (Mining and Processing Kombinat) and Ordzhonikidze GOK extract and enrich ferroalloy ores, controlling the domestic market of this raw material (cities of Marhanets and Pokrov, respectively)
- “Suha Balka” JSC extracts iron ore (Kryvyi Rih)

==== Ferroalloy mills ====
Apart from its ferroalloy-ore assets, Privat Group has stakes in all three of Ukraine's ferroalloy mills and controls two of them.

- formerly Nikopol Ferroalloys Plant, the world's second ferroalloy manufacturer (co-owned and fiercely fought over with the Interpipe Group) (Nikopol), the privatisation was declared illegal in 2006.
- Stakhanov Ferroalloy Plant (Kadiivka, Luhansk Oblast of Ukraine)
- Zaporizhzhia Ferroalloy Plant (Zaporizhzhia)
- Alapayevsk Metallurgy Plant (Alapayevsk, Russia)
- Ferroalloys company in Romania (mentioned by the group co-owner but undisclosed as yet)
- Highlanders Alloys LLC (New Haven, United States)

==== Steel mills ====
- Dnipropetrovsk Metallurgy Kombinat named after Petrovskyi (Dnipro)

=== Oil industry ===
According to the media, Privat Group owns significant shares in Ukrnafta and Halychyna oil refinery, controlling their business. Ukrnafta is the half-state-owned national oil company, dealing with extraction of petroleum and gas condensate, as well as retailing gasoline through its large gas station network. Halychyna owns and operates Ukraine's oldest oil refinery in Drohobych, Lviv Oblast.

The group also recently acquired control over Chornomorsk Fuel Terminal Company, operating the oil & petrol terminal in the Black Sea port of Chornomorsk.

=== Chemical industry ===
The group owns Kamianske based chemical plant "DniproAzot" with 1000000 tons per year of ammonia capacity and 750000 tons per year of urea capacity.

=== Food industry ===
Privat Group owns the Dnipro-based “Biola” soft drinks company.

The group may also control sugar beet processing plants throughout Ukraine.

=== Energy industry ===
In 2005, Privat Group bought controlling shares in five companies that fully control electricity distribution in Ivano-Frankivsk, Poltava, Sumy, Chernihiv and Lviv Oblasts. The names of these companies are the name of the respective oblast with the -oblenergo ending, e.g. “Poltavaoblenergo”.

=== Banking ===
Privatbank, was the core of the group, as the largest commercial bank in Ukraine. On 18 December 2016, the bank was nationalized by the government of Ukraine, taking 100% ownership.

=== Media ===
Privat Group officially controls the Privat-TV regional television channel in Dnipro. Ihor Kolomoyskyi, one of the group's co-owners, brought a court suit demanding the right to purchase a controlling stake in Channel 1+1, a popular nationwide TV company. According to media, Privat Group also controls the UNIAN news agency.

=== Sports ===
Privat Group indirectly owns FC Dnipro professional football club as well as the HC Budivelnyk hockey and BC Budivelnyk basketball teams.

=== Real estate ===
They own 2/3rd of Optima Ventures, a Miami-based real estate investment firm led by Chaim Schochet; the remaining 1/3rd is owned by Miami businessman Mordechai "Motti" Korf and Uri Laber. Optima owns more than 5 million square feet of real estate in the United States and is the largest holder of real estate in Downtown Cleveland owning One Cleveland Center and 55 Public Square; they are previous owners of the Huntington Bank Building; and the Penton Media Building.

== Relations and controversies ==
Privat Group is involved in a permanent and fierce business conflict with Ukrainian oligarch Viktor Pinchuk and his Interpipe Group. The groups are based in Dnipropetrovsk Oblast, sharing a long and complicated history of relations. Presently, the conflict focuses on the bilaterally owned Nikopol Ferroalloys Plant (Interpipe now controls the plant’s business). Both sides apply full-scale legal, public relations and political methods in the conflict. Ihor Kolomoyskyi (the main owner of Privat Group) and Pinchuk sometimes insult each other in their interviews.

Henadiy Korban, one of Privat Group's top managers, survived serious assassination attempts in Dnipro in March 2006, and again in September 2010.

Before the Orange Revolution, Privat Group had been widely regarded as relatively uninvolved in politics, but loyal to the Leonid Kuchma regime. After the government change, the group's owners, according to media, became close allies of Yulia Tymoshenko (although she publicly denies this). Analysts agree that some of Tymoshenko's decisions as the Prime Minister of Ukraine supported Privat side in conflicts.

Some sources state that Privat Group provided significant financial support for Viktor Yuschenko during his presidential campaign and subsequent Orange Revolution.

== See also ==
- Economy of Ukraine
- Dnipropetrovsk Mafia
