= Biola =

Biola may refer to:

== Places ==
- Biola University, a university in Los Angeles County, California
- Biola, California, a small town in Fresno County
- Biola (island), an island in Singapore

== People ==
- Biola Alabi, Nigerian businesswoman

== Business and Economy ==
- Biola (brand), a Ukrainian producer of juices and soft drinks
