= Nikopol Ferroalloy Plant =

Nikopol Ferroalloy plant PAT Nikopol's'kyi Zavod Ferosplaviv (ПАТ 'Нікопольський завод феросплавів')
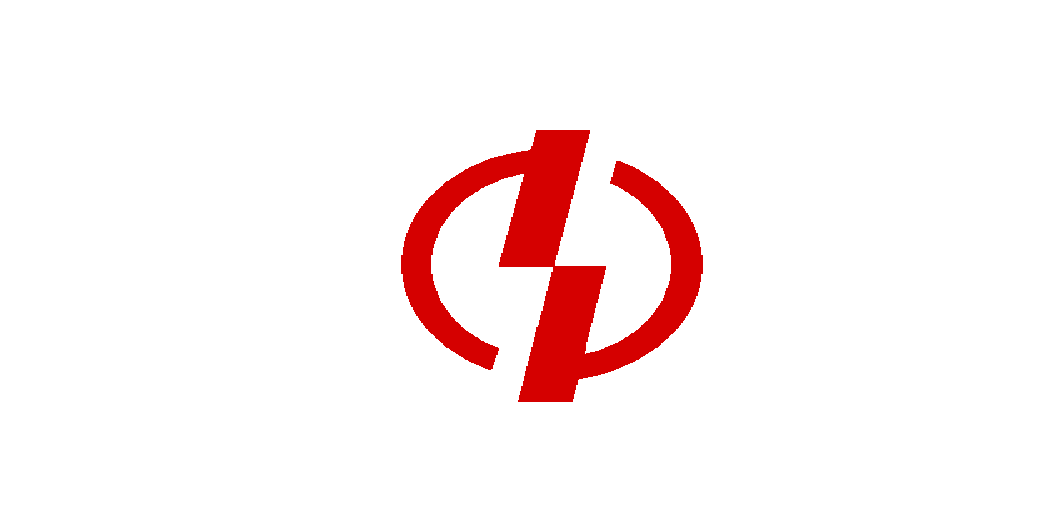
- Company type: Public JSC
- Industry: Auxiliary steel industry
- Founded: 1958
- Founder: Council of Ministers of the Soviet Union
- Headquarters: Nikopol, Dnipropetrovsk ob., Ukraine
- Key people: Chairman of the Board, CEO : Ruslan Valeriyovych Ponomarenko
- Products: Manganese alloys (bulk)
- Owner: private persons
- Parent: Interpipe
- Website: nzf.com.ua

The Public JSC 'Nikopol Ferroalloy Plant' is a producer of manganese ferroalloy and related material located in Ukraine.

== Background ==
The plant is one of the largest global producers of manganese alloys, and is situated in the Dnipropetrovsk region of Ukraine, close to large manganese ore deposits. The two main products of the plant are Ferromanganese (FeMn) and Ferrosilicomanganese (FeSiMn)

Plant capacity is over 1 million metric tonnes of silicomanganese and 250,000 tonnes of high carbon ferromanganese, along with significant production capabilities in materials required for manganese production (fluxes). Additionally waste slag supplies the construction industry. The alloys are produced from manganese ore and coke in an electric arc furnace.

== Company history ==
In 1958 the USSR council of ministers gave a decree for the construction of a manganese ferroalloy plant at Nikopol in Ukraine. Including the factory buildings a water supply and electricity supply had also to be built. By 1966 the factory was sufficiently complete for the first tapping of No.1 furnace.

By 1975 over 2 million tonnes of silico-manganese had been produced. In the troubled times of the 1990s brought about by the collapse of the Soviet Union and Ukrainian independence the factory had difficulty obtaining raw materials, and even the electricity to power the furnaces was in short supply. Nevertheless, by 2004 furnace No. 14 produced its first million tons of alloy.

=== Privatisation and de-privatisation ===
In 2003 as part of a governmental privatisation plan a 50% stake in the plant was sold to Interpipe Group for 80million dollars considered to be a fraction of its true worth. A further 26% was acquired by the Privat Group. The sale later became part of a political scandal in Ukraine relating to privatisations as well as court proceedings to undo the privatisation. The situation echos similar problems with the privatisation of other major Ukrainian industrial concerns, including Luhanskteplovoz and Kryvorizhstal; both being also sold for under market value, in privatisation sales that were later reversed. The company was also fought over by the two major stake holders Privat Group and Interpipe.

Investigations into abuse of authority by the state officials during the initial privatisation have taken place, and the sale was declared illegal in 2005 with attempts to block any further privatisation attempts made in 2006.

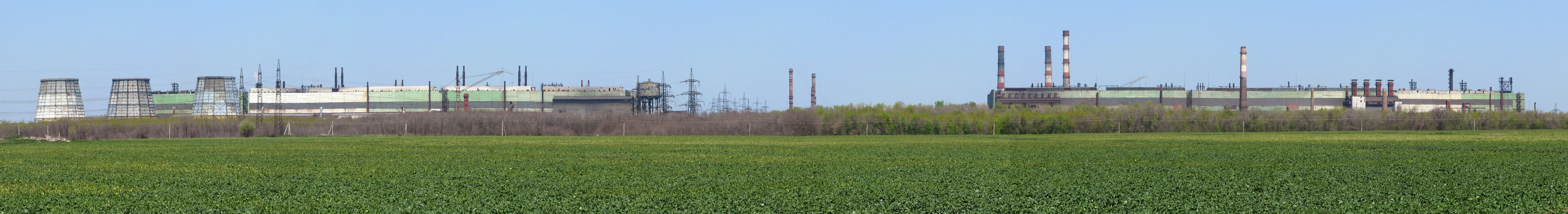
Panorama of the plant

== See also ==
- FC Elektrometalurh-NZF Nikopol
