= Nikopol River Port =

Port in Ukraine

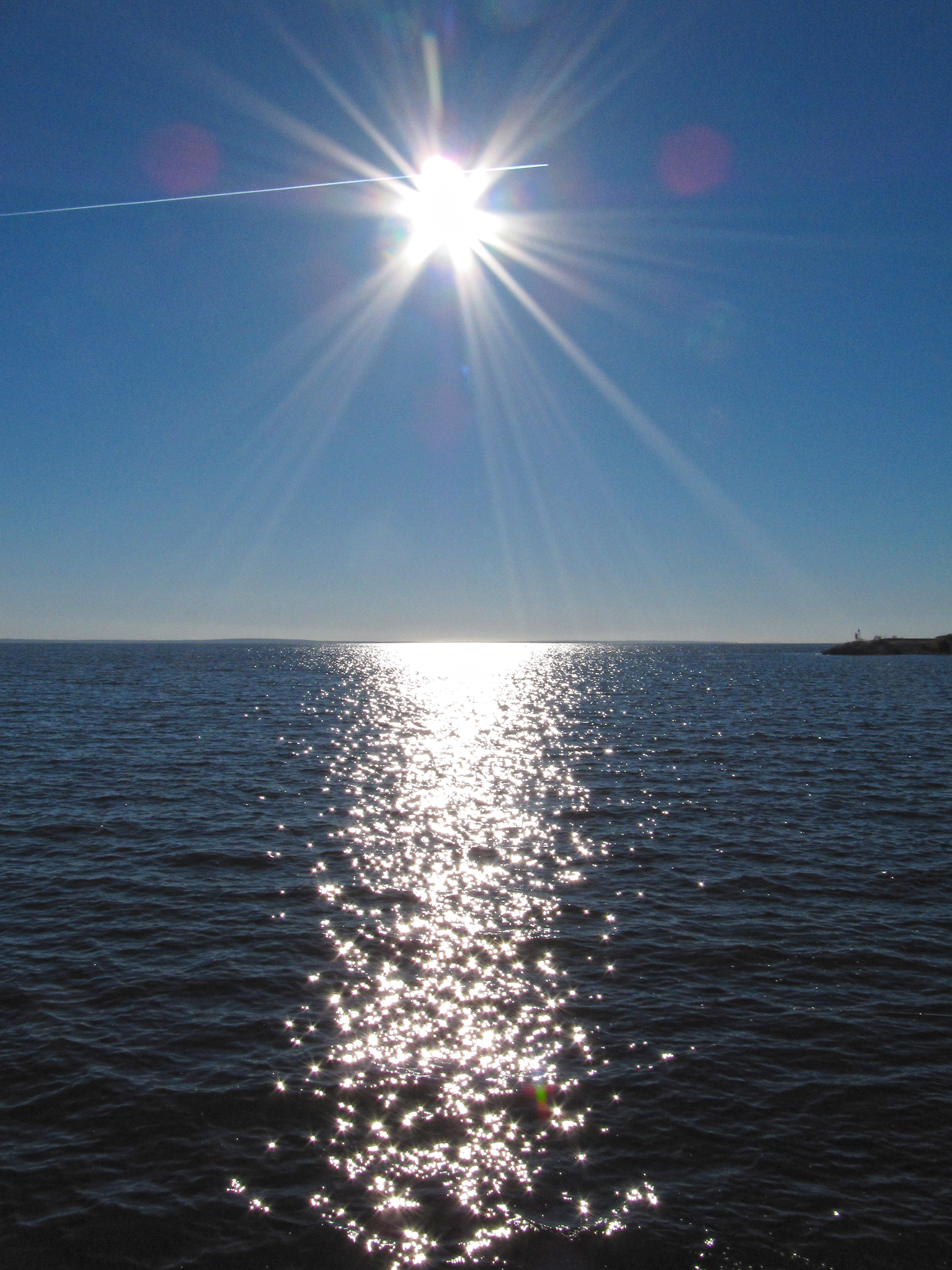
- View of the Mamai Tomb across the Kakhovka Reservoir from Nikopol River Port.
- Click on the map for a fullscreen view
- Native name: Нікопольський річковий порт

Location
- Country: Ukraine
- Location: 53200, Dnipropetrovsk Oblast, Nikopol, Paromna Street, 26

Nikopol River Port is an enterprise in the field of river transport. It is located on the Dnieper in Nikopol. The nearest ports are Zaporizhzhia River Port - 84 km up the Dnieper and Novokakhovka River Port which is 110 km down the Dnieper. Ever since the 19th century there was a pier in Nikopol. The Nikopol River Port was built in 1956 on the shores of the Kakhovka Reservoir. Since 1974, the Nikopol River Port has been a part of the Zaporizhzhia River Port. NRP specializes in freight and passenger transportation (ferrys) on the line "Nikopol" - "Kamyanka-Dniprovska." Bulk and general cargoes, generally, building materials (sand, rubble) are also processed here. The port is located 310 kilometers from the mouth of the Dnieper. Berths accept vessels such as "river-sea" variety (length up to 180 m, depth up to 4 m).

== See also ==
- List of ports in Ukraine
- Cargo turnover of Ukrainian ports
