= Halychyna Oil Refinery Complex =

Oil refinery in Drohobych, Ukraine

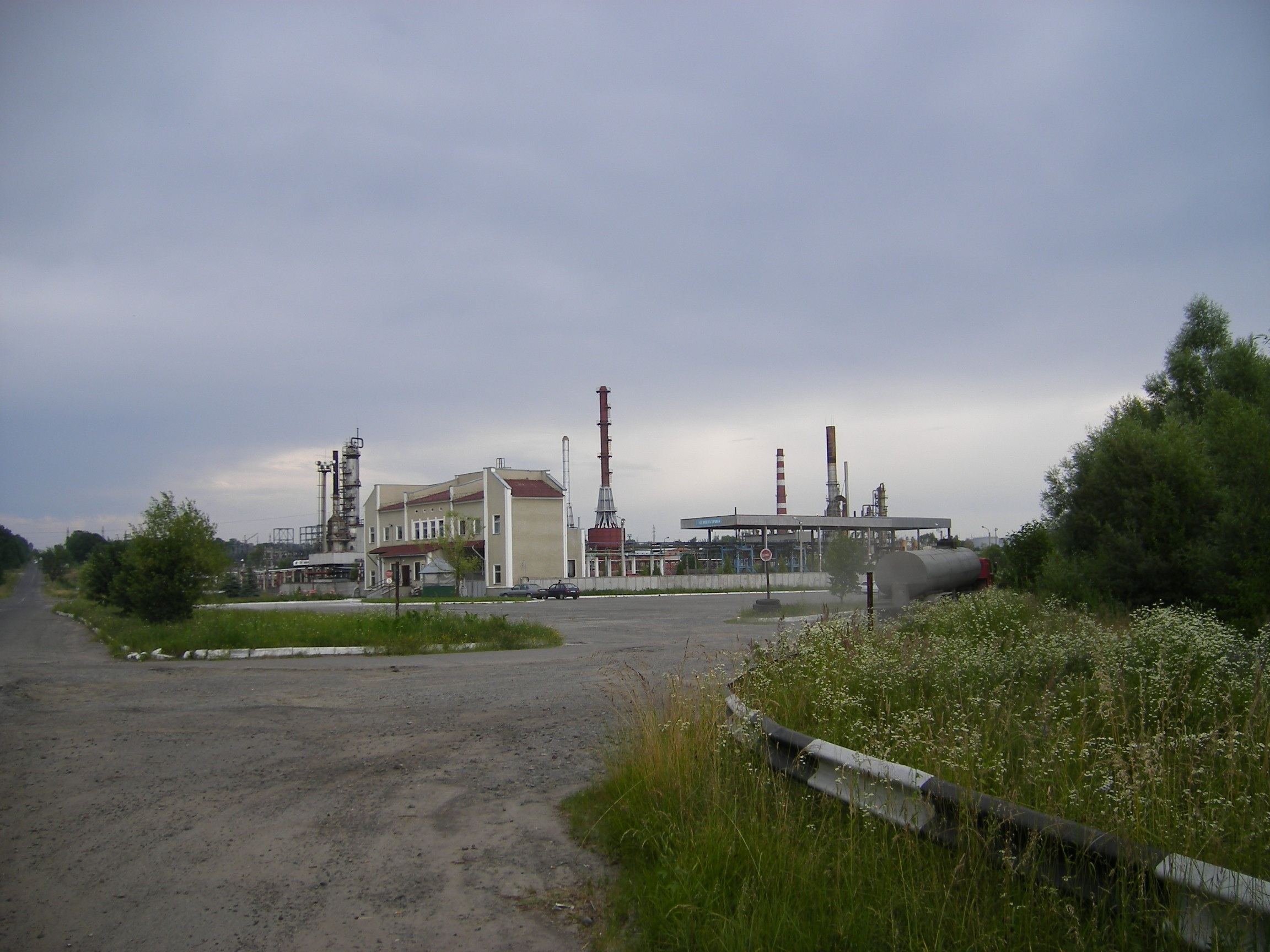
- Native name: Галичина (нафтопереробний комплекс)
- Type: Public company
- Founded: 1863
- Headquarters: Ukraine, 82103, Lviv Oblast, Drohobych, street Borislavska, 82
- Revenue: 311,991,000 hryvnia (2025)
- Total assets: 14,273,178,000 hryvnia (2025)
- Number of employees: 942 (2017)
- Footnotes; Код ЄДРПОУ 00152388 (Unified State Register of Enterprises and Organizations of Ukraine Code Number)

The Halychyna Oil Refinery Complex (formerly Drohobych Oil Refinery) was the oldest oil refinery in Ukraine, built in 1863. As of 2005, its capacity is about 3.5 million tons of crude oil per year. The refinery is located in the city of Drohobych, Lviv Oblast.

It was originally established as Altman and Gottlieb in 1863, before being renamed a century later under the Soviet authorities to Drohobych Oil Refinery. Following the collapse of the Soviet Union, it became Halychyna Oil Refinery Complex. The refinery stopped production in the mid-2010s following its failure to modernise, and in 2023 bankruptcy proceedings were sought against the refinery, with the total amount of claims reaching 19.3 billion hryvnias.

== History ==
The plant was founded in 1863, after a large refinery named Altman and Gottlieb was founded in the city as a joint-stock company, which was named after its owners. This was the basis of the plant, and in 1963 it was subsequently renamed by the Soviet authorities as the Drohobych Oil Refinery. It was later renamed to PJSC Oil Refining Complex Halychyna following the collapse of the Soviet Union.

=== Closure and legal issues ===
The refinery ceased production at some point in the mid-2010s due to outdated equipment and the shareholders not investing in modernisation to compete with more modern plants. Subsequently, the Privat Group gained control of the plant and repurposed it as a fuel storage facility. It has also been used as an intermediary for oil supplies to the Kremenchuk Oil Refinery, which was still operating before the Russian invasion of Ukraine. In December 2023, Ukrnafta announced they were initiating bankruptcy proceedings for the Halychyna Oil Refinery Complex for unpaid debts. In subsequent court documents, it was revealed that there was over 828 million hryvnias worth of debt.

On 28 December 2023, all buildings belonging to the complex were put under arrest, although movable property wasn't. In January 2024, a series of claims were made against the complex by people associated with Ihor Kolomoisky, with the total exceeding 7 billion hryvnias. These included the three Cyprus-registered offshore companies that had previously owned 42% of Ukrnafta shares prior to 2022. Further claims were also made by a variety of companies, including Swiss ones, Eastern European ones, and British Virgin Islands companies. In total, the debts with these claims reached 19.3 billion hryvnias.

On 25 September 2025 the Economic Court of Lviv Oblast dismissed the entire board of the complex, as Ukrnafta claimed the board was not taking effective measures to recover significant accounts receivable and that the board chairman himself, Bohdan Baradny, had not been present in Ukraine for over two years.

== Awards ==
- Order of the Red Banner of Labour

== See also ==
- Privat Group
- Petro Dyminskyi
- Ihor Kolomoyskyi
