= Petro Dyminskyi =

Ukrainian politician, businessman, and former footballer

- Петро Димінський
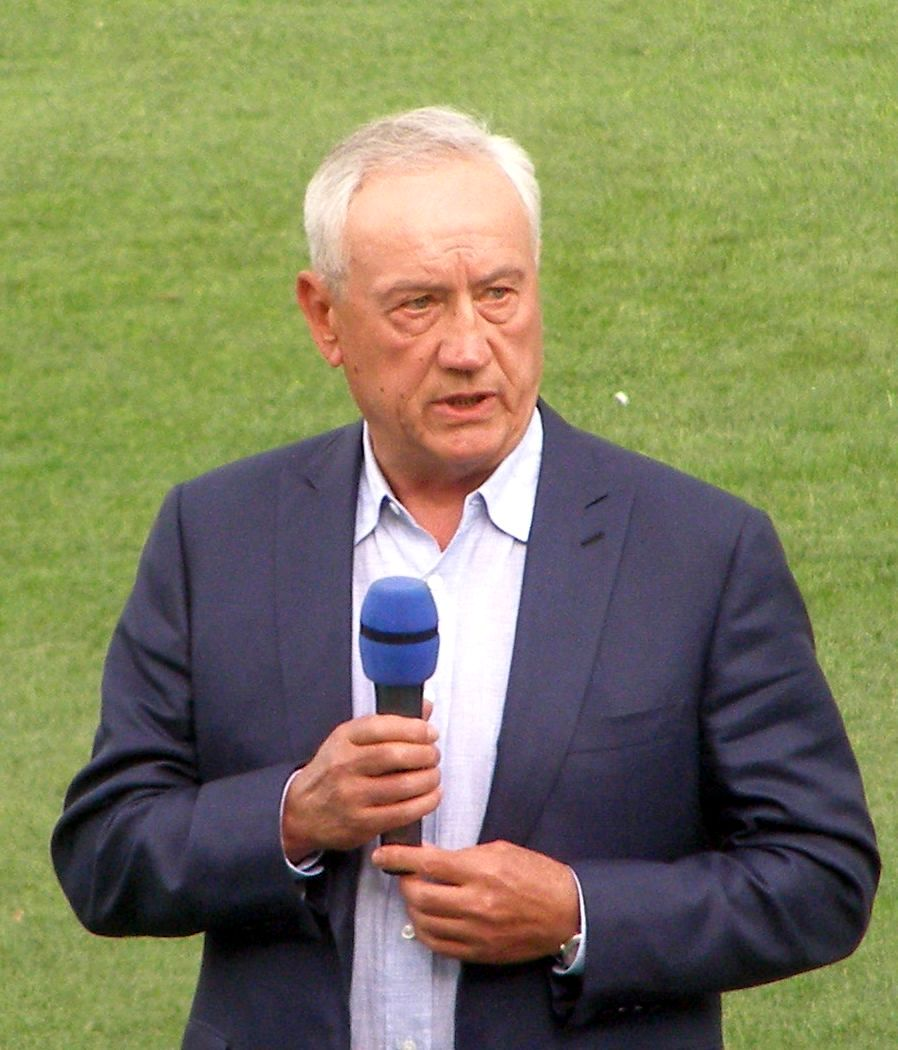
- Dyminskyi in 2017

People's Deputy of Ukraine
- In office 14 May 2002 – 25 May 2006
- Preceded by: Zoryslava Romovska
- Succeeded by: Constituency abolished
- Constituency: Lviv Oblast, No. 122

Personal details
- Born: 27 November 1954 (age 71) Kryvyi Rih, Ukrainian SSR, Soviet Union (now Ukraine)
- Party: Independent
- Other political affiliations: Our Ukraine Bloc; Party of Regions
- Children: 2
- Occupation: Businessman

Petro Petrovych Dyminskyi (Ukrainian: Петро́ Петро́вич Димі́нський; born 27 November 1954) is a Ukrainian politician, businessman and former footballer for FC Kryvbas Kryvyi Rih. In 2016, his wealth was estimated at $103 million.

He was a People's Deputy of Ukraine from 2002 to 2006 as a representative of Ukraine's 122nd electoral district, located in Lviv Oblast. Originally elected as a member of the Our Ukraine Bloc, he later joined the Party of Regions.

His whereabouts have been unknown since he became a named suspect in fatal 2017 car crash. He is wanted by Ukrainian authorities.

== Biography ==
In the 1990s, Dyminskyi worked as a director of selected mines in the Western Ukraine. He owns or co-owns the Ukrainian football team FC Karpaty Lviv, WOG, ZIK, and Halychyna Oil Refinery.

He was a people's Deputy of Ukraine, serving in the Verkhovna Rada (Ukraine's national parliament) from 2002 to 2006. He was elected on the list (as non-partisan) of Our Ukraine but later switched to the faction of Party of Regions.

Along with some other People's Deputies (Ihor Yeremeyev, Stepan Ivakhiv and Serhiy Lahur), in December 2012 he founded the fuel-industrial group Kontinium.

=== Escape from Ukraine ===
Dyminskyi is a named suspect in a fatal car accident, which resulted in the death of 31-year-old Natalia Trila on 18 August 2017. Since 22 August 2017 Dyminskyi is in an unknown location outside Ukraine. He is wanted by Ukrainian authorities.

Two months after the crash, Dyminskyi purchased a duplex for 280,000 euros in a gated community in Athens, Greece. This investment gave him a Greek Golden Visa. Around the same time, he also secured a Serbian passport. His wife, Olena, also obtained Serbian citizenship. According to a joint journalistic investigation by the Belarusian Investigative Center, NGL.media, OCCRP and other investigators, as well as Cyber Partisans, the sale of ZIK took place through the Belarusian Absolutbank, owned by businessman Mikalai Varabei, and Dyminskyi’s Cypriot company held unsuccessful negotiations on the purchase of the Belarusian BTA Bank.
