= Zaporizhzhia River Port =

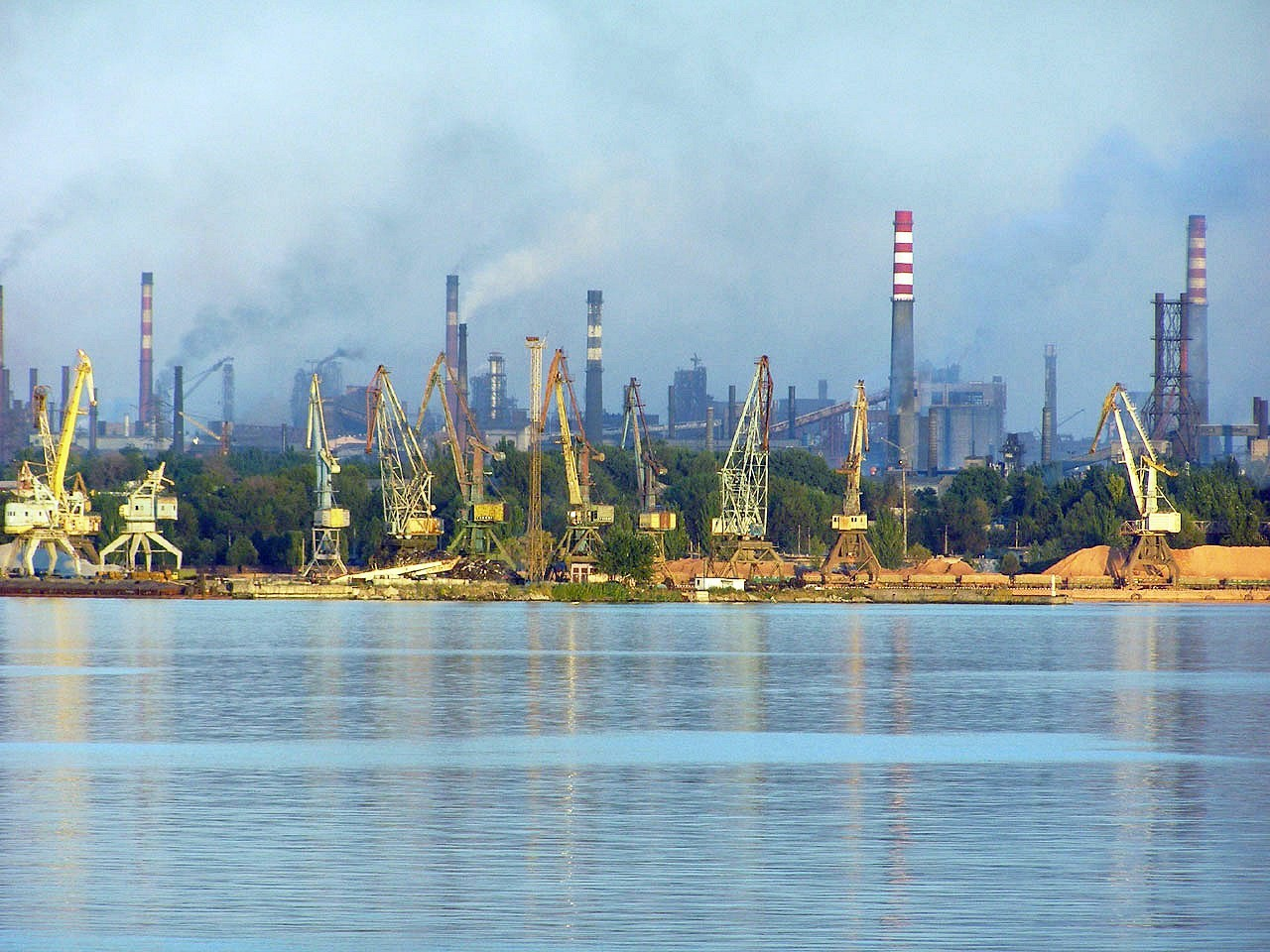
- Click on the map for a fullscreen view
- Native name: Запорізький річковий порт

Location
- Country: Ukraine
- Location: Zaporizhzhia, Dniprovskyi Raion (Zaporizhzhia), Leonova Street, 1-a
- Coordinates: 47°51′59″N 35°6′1″E

Details
- Opened: 1934
- No. of berths: 13

Statistics
- Website «Укррічфлот»

Zaporizhzhia River Port (formerly Lenin Port) specializes in the processing of ore, coke, coal, scrap metal, hardware, fertilizers, clay, sand, ferroalloys, and bauxite. The port's cargo processing capacity is 6 million tons per year. Zaporizhzhia River Port accepts vessels of the river-sea type with a length of up to 180 m and a depth of up to 4 m. The port area is 39.7 hectares and includes 13 cargo berths with a total length of 2787.7 m, including two berths in the Port of Nikopol (297.2 m).

== See also ==
- List of ports in Ukraine
- Cargo turnover of Ukrainian ports
