= Biola (brand) =

Soft Drinks and Juice brand in Ukraine

A new logo

Biola (Ukrainian: ТМ «Біола») is a Ukrainian producer of juices and soft drinks. Biola is part of the bigger Ukrainian business group Privat Group.

Biola also was a long-time sponsor of FC Dnipro, title sponsor of the 2008-09 Ukrainian Premier League, and is general sponsor of the Tennis Federation of Ukraine, BC Dnipro.

== History ==
The company appeared with establishing of the Erlan Factory in Dnipro in 1997. In 2005 the company expanded and built another factory in Kyiv, Orlan Factory. In 200 the firm launched an additional line for the production of soft drinks at the Orlan plant. In 2014 the company experienced its rebranding having changed the logo and the slogan.

Biola is a partner of the World Ladies Cup fitness tournament.

== Gallery ==
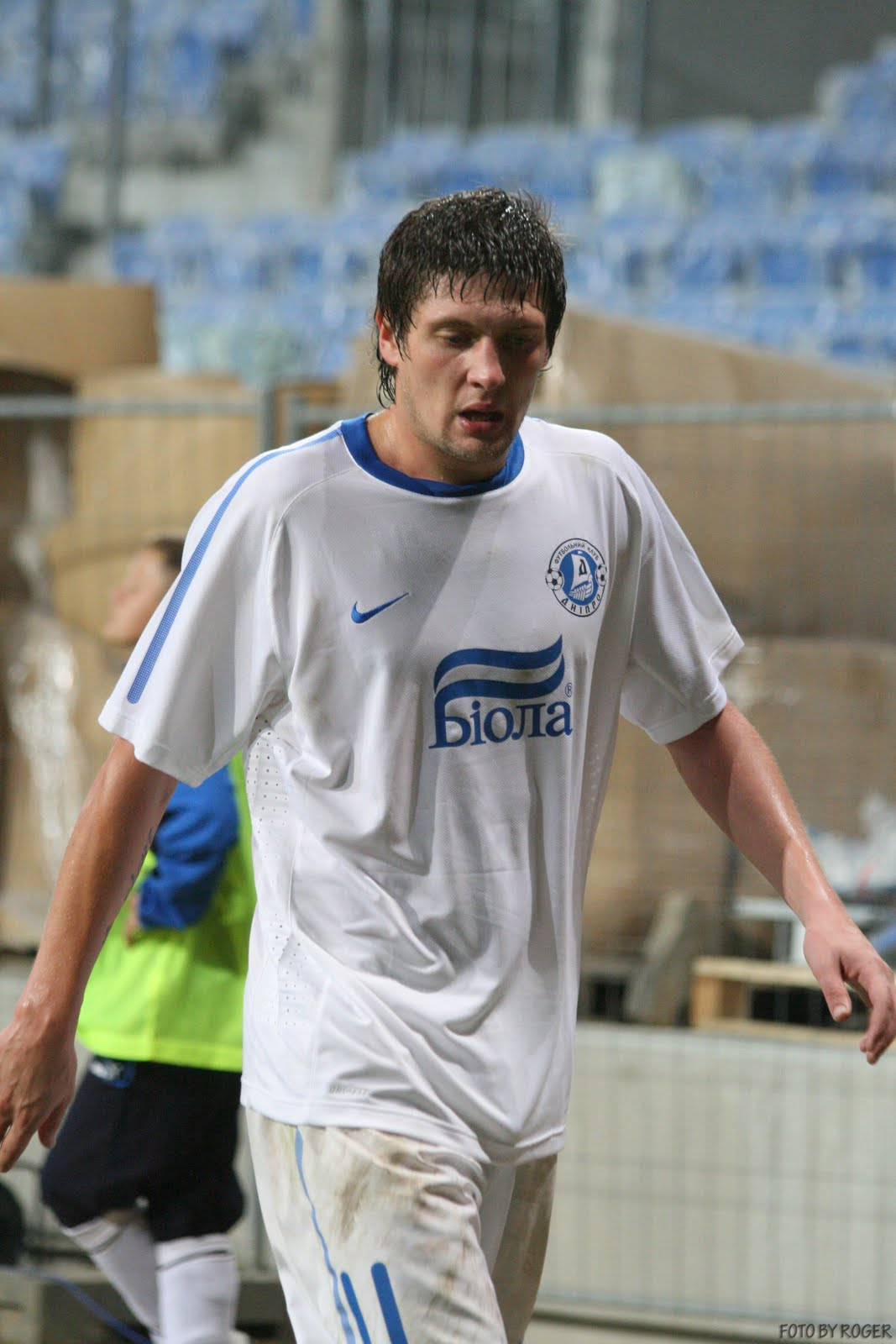
Yevhen Seleznyov in 2010 (FC Dnipro)

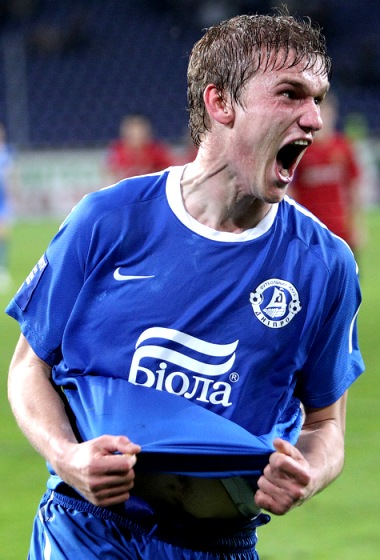
Oleksandr Hladkyi in 2011 (FC Dnipro)
