= Nikopol, Ukraine =

City in Dnipropetrovsk Oblast, Ukraine

Nikopol Нікополь Mykytyn Rih
- City
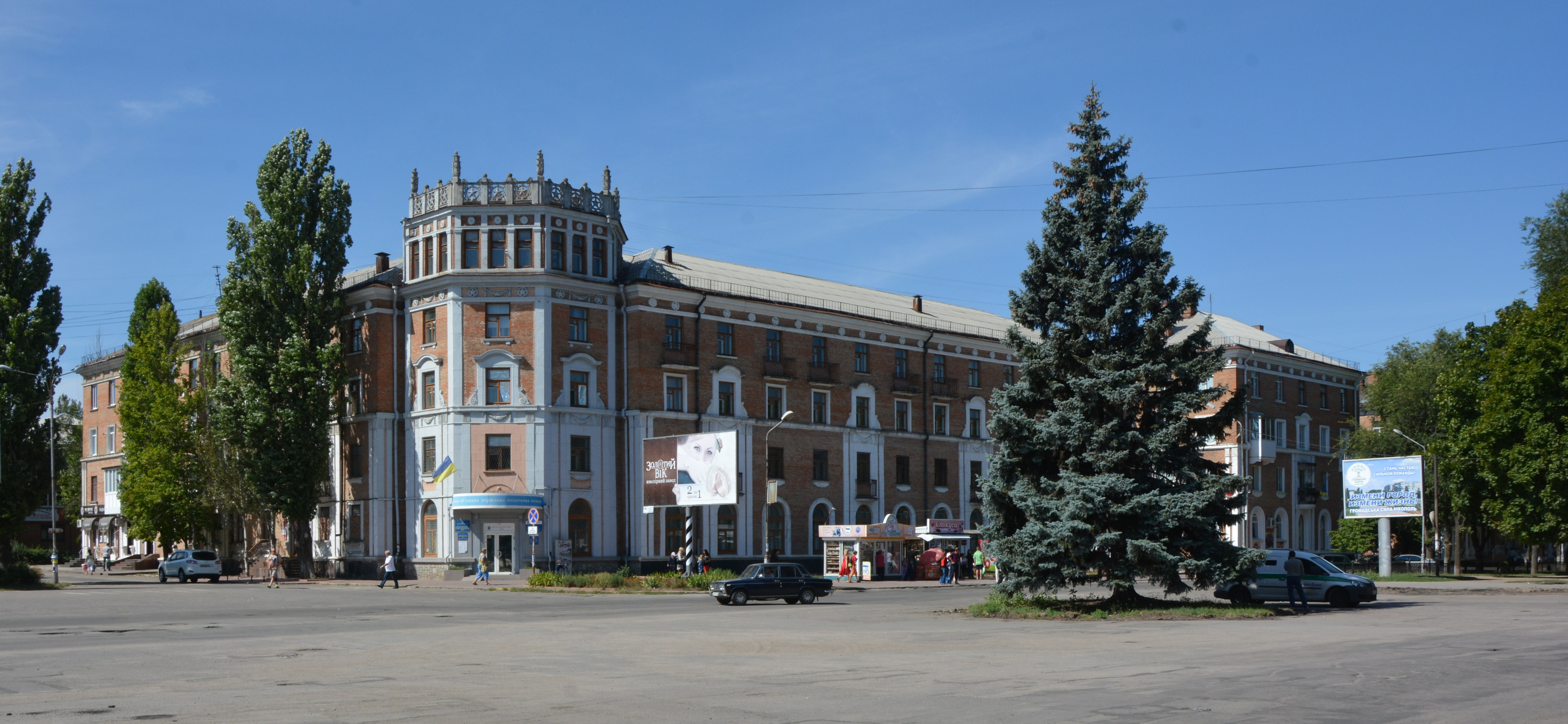
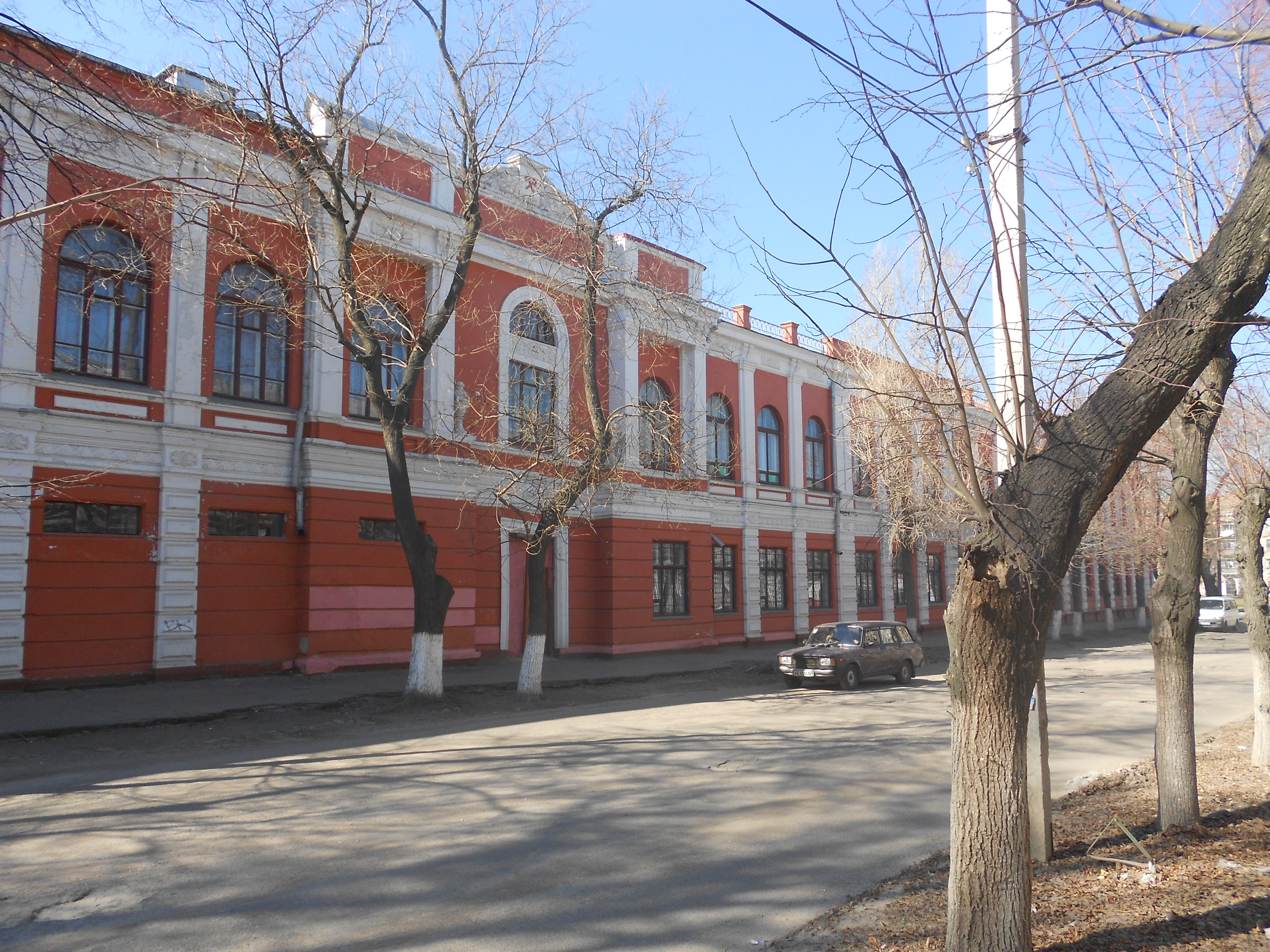
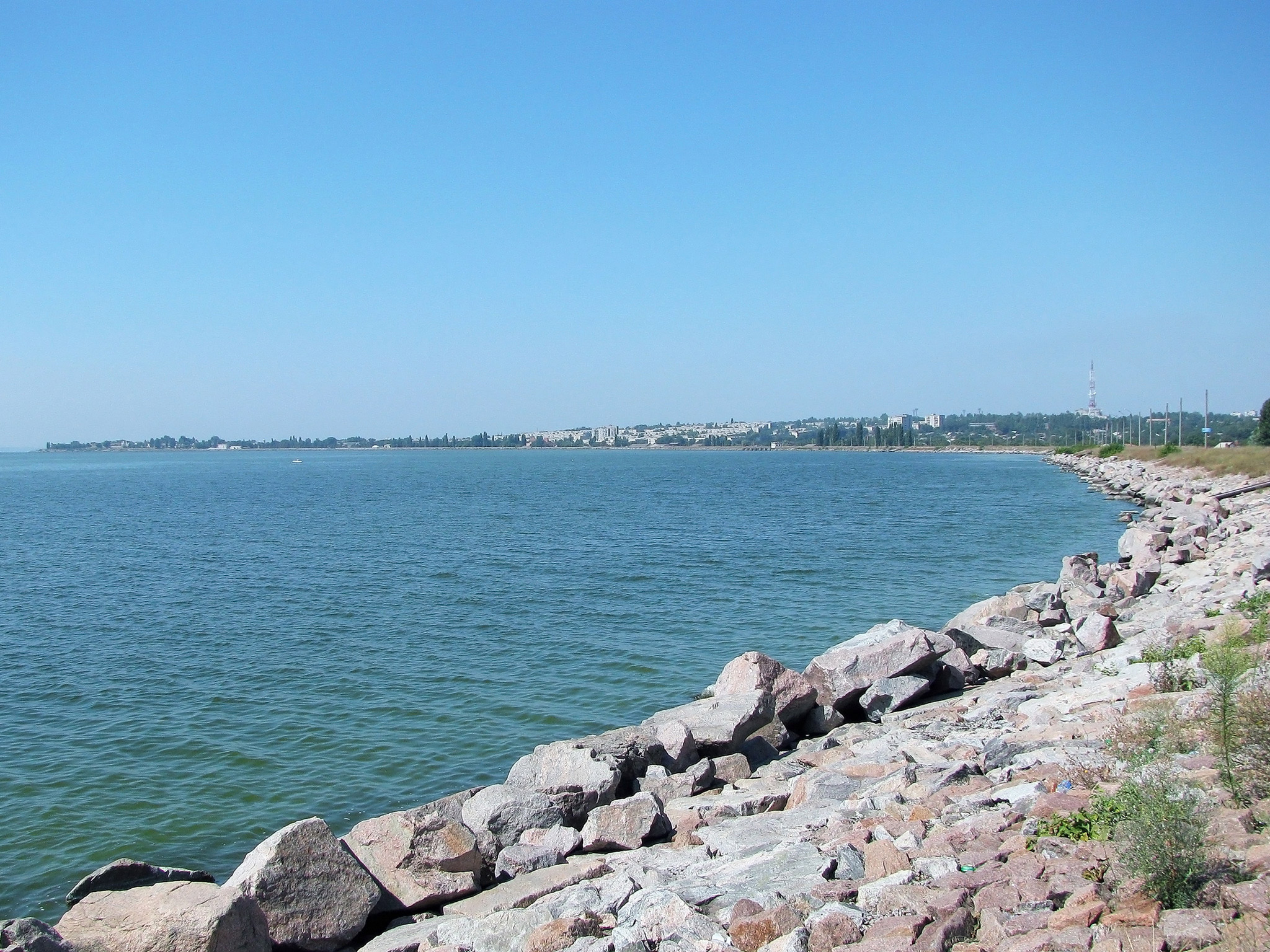
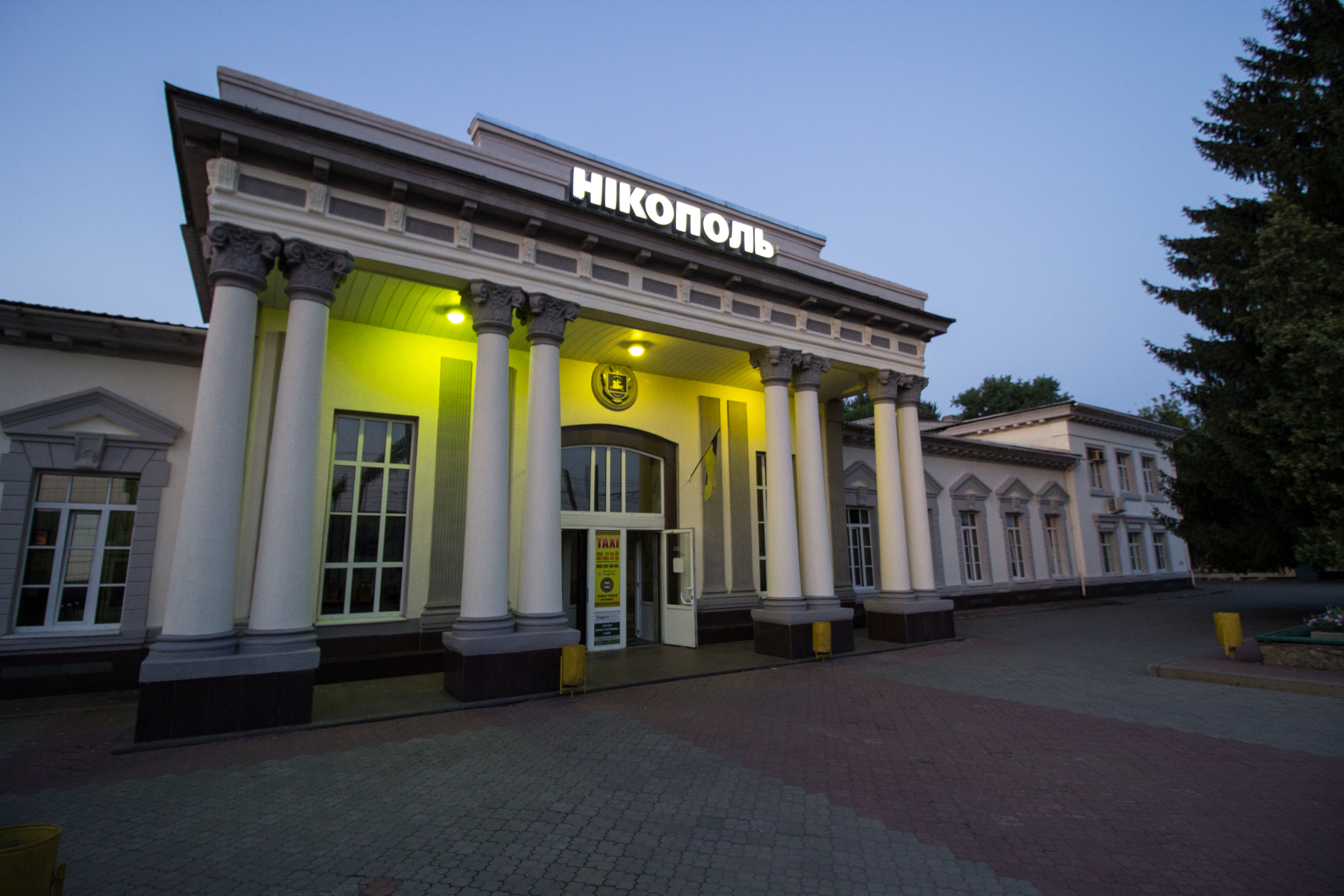
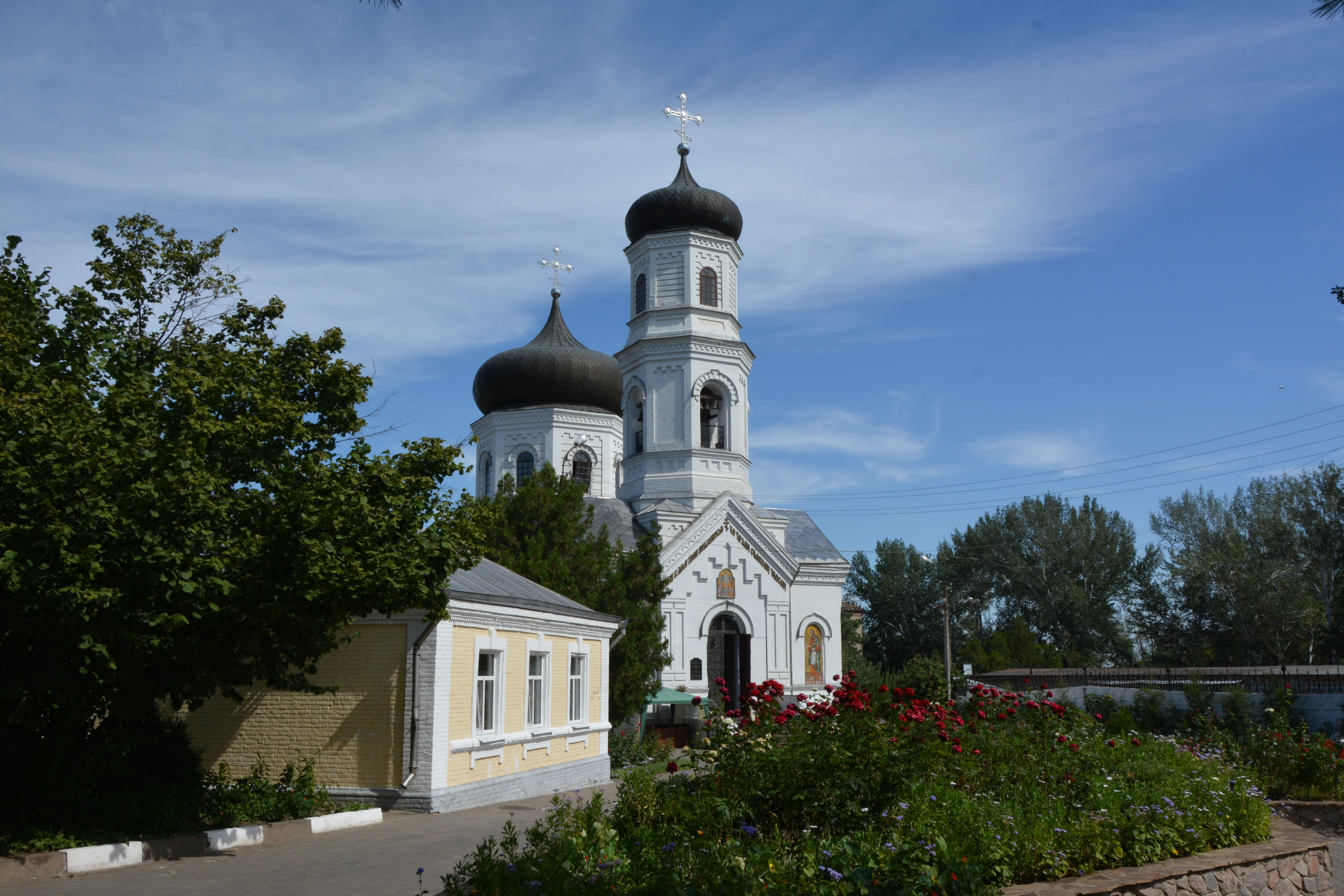
- Nezalezhnosti Square Old Town Embankment Railway station Transfiguration Church

- Flag Coat of arms
- Nickname: The City of Victory
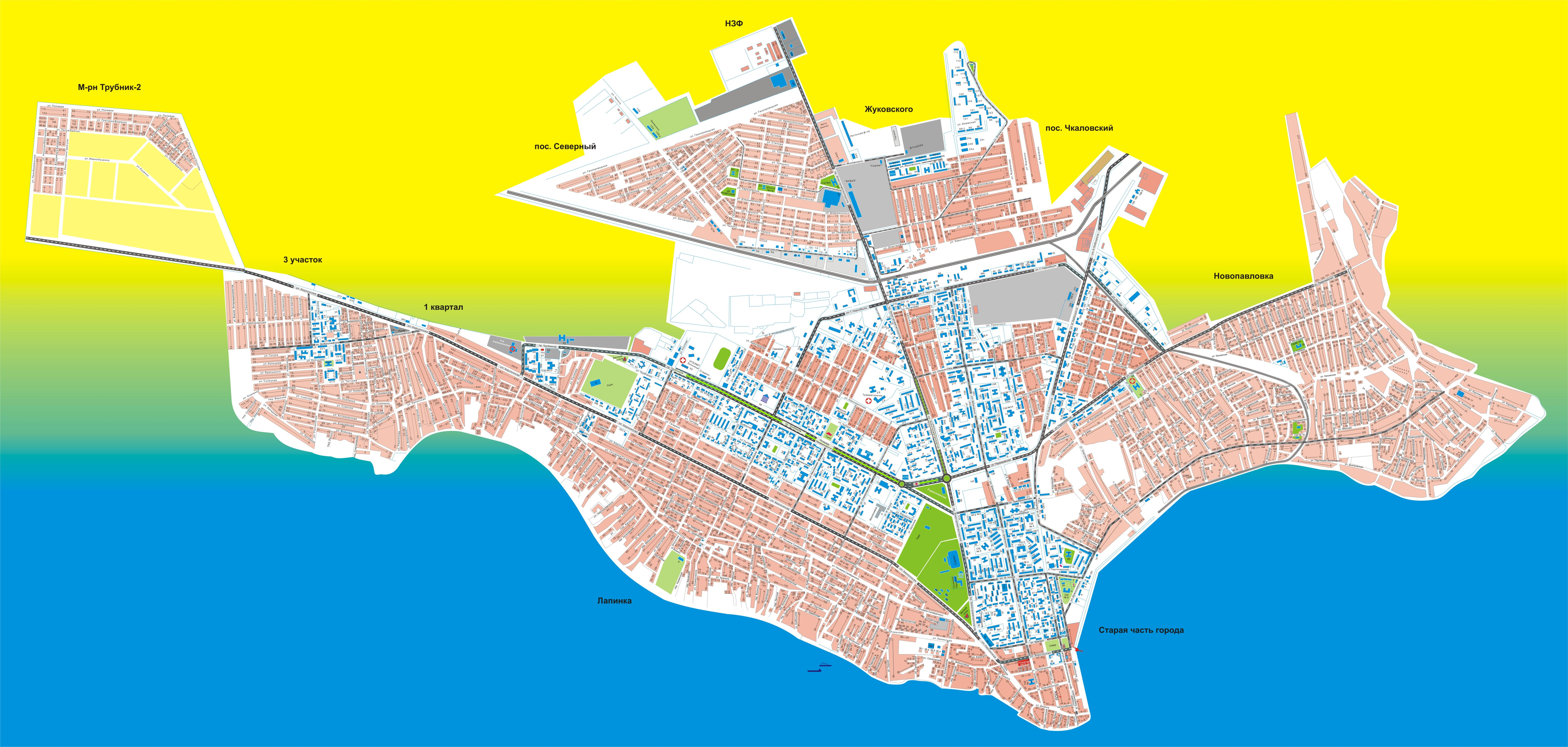
- Interactive map of Nikopol
- Nikopol in Ukraine Nikopol (Dnipropetrovsk Oblast)
- Coordinates: 47°34′N 34°24′E
- Country: Ukraine
- Oblast: Dnipropetrovsk Oblast
- Raion: Nikopol Raion
- Hromada: Nikopol urban hromada
- Founded: 1639
- City status: 1915

Area
  - Total: 59 km^{2} (23 sq mi)
- Elevation: 70 m (230 ft)

Population (2022)
  - Total: 105,160
  - Density: 2,764/km^{2} (7,160/sq mi)
- Postal code: 53200—53239
- Area code: +380-5662
- Website: www.nikopol-mrada.dp.gov.ua

Nikopol (Ukrainian: Нікополь, pronounced [ˈn⁽ʲ⁾ikopolʲ]) is a city and municipality (hromada) in Nikopol Raion in the south of Ukraine, on the right bank of the Dnieper River, about 63 km south-east of Kryvyi Rih and 48 km south-west of Zaporizhzhia. Population: 105.160 (2022 estimate).

Nikopol is the fourth-most populous city in Dnipropetrovsk Oblast. Located on a cape by the Kakhovka reservoir, it is a powerful industrial city with several pipe-producing factories, such as the Interpipe corporation, and steel rolling mills, such as the factory of ferroalloys, constituting Nikopol metropolitan area.

Formerly, the settlement served as one of the capital cities of the Zaporizhian Sich and was known as one of the main crossings over the Dnieper.

== General information ==
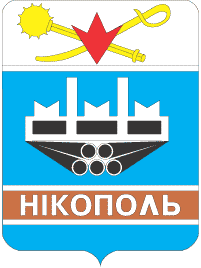
Soviet city's emblem (1966) depicting the Southern Pipe Factory. The top shows a crossing of a ceremonial mace bulawa, and a variation of Cossack szabla

Renamed by the Russian Empire into Slaviansk and later Nikopol (after Ancient Greek: Νικόπολις, lit. 'City of Victory'), the city has a rich preceding history. Between 1638 and 1652, it was the settlement of Mykytyn Rih (Ukrainian: Микитин Ріг, lit. 'Mykyta's Cape'), a capital of the Zaporozhian Sich. It was one of the main crossings over the Dnieper, located on the shore of the Great Meadow.

The 1911 edition of Encyclopedia Britannica gave the following description of Nikopol: "It was formerly called Nikitin Rog, and occupies an elongated peninsula between two arms of the Dnieper at a point where its banks are low and marshy, and has been for centuries one of the places where the middle Dnieper can most conveniently be crossed."

In 1900, its 21,282 inhabitants were Ukrainians, Jews and Mennonites, who carry on agriculture and shipbuilding. The former Sich, or fortified camp of the Zaporozhian Cossacks, brilliantly described in N. V. Gogol's novel Taras Bulba (1834) was situated a little higher up the river. Several graves in the vicinity recall the battles fought to possess this important strategic point.

One of the graves, close to the town, contained, along with other Scythian antiquities, a precious vase representing the capture of wild horses. In the early 20th century Nikopol, which is situated on the highway from Dnipro to Kherson, was the point where the "salt-highway" of the Chumaks (Ukrainian salt-carriers) to the Crimea crossed the Dnipro. Nikopol was, further, one of the chief places on the lower Dnieper for the export of corn, linseed, hemp, and wool.

== History ==
=== Archaeological excavations ===
According to archaeological excavations, the city's area was populated as early as the Neolithic epoch in the 4th millennium BCE as evidenced by remnants of a settlement discovered on banks of Mala Kamianka River. In burial mounds from the copper–bronze epoch of the 3rd–1st millenniums BCE were found stone and bronze tools, clay sharp-bottomed ornamental dishes. Also found were burials from the Scythian–Sarmatian period, between the 2nd century BCE and the 2nd century CE.

=== Mykytyn Rih / Mykytyn Sich ===
At the beginning of the 16th century, in the location of modern Nikopol, appeared a river crossing over the Dnieper controlled by Cossacks, called Mykytyn Rih. According to a folk legend, a Cossack named Mykyta Tsyhan established it. Under the same name, the crossing is mentioned in the diary of the Holy Roman Empire envoy Erich Lassota von Steblau, who visited the Zaporizhian Sich in 1594.

In 1638–1639, Cossacks led by F. Linchai built a fort which was named Mykytyn Sich (Ukrainian: Микитинська Січ). In 1652, due to conflict with the Hetman of Zaporizhian Host, Kosh Otaman Fedir Liutay moved the administrative seat to Chortomlyk.

By 1648, in the proximity of today's Nikopol, Mykytyn Sich was built. It is renowned for the location of Bohdan Khmelnytsky being elected as the Hetman of Ukraine and as where the Khmelnytsky Uprising against the Polish–Lithuanian Commonwealth started. Until 1775, the time of the Sich sacking, it was called "Mykytyn Rih", "Mykytyn Pereviz", or simply "Mykytyne".

The name rih (Ukrainian for horn) was given because the locality rose at a place reminiscing a peninsula, as it was almost surrounded by the Dnieper river (see Kryvyi Rih). Mykytyne was a town of the Kodak Palanka, an administrative division of the Zaporizhian Sich. Later, it was renamed into Slovianske and then Nikopol.

=== Sloviansk / Nikopol ===
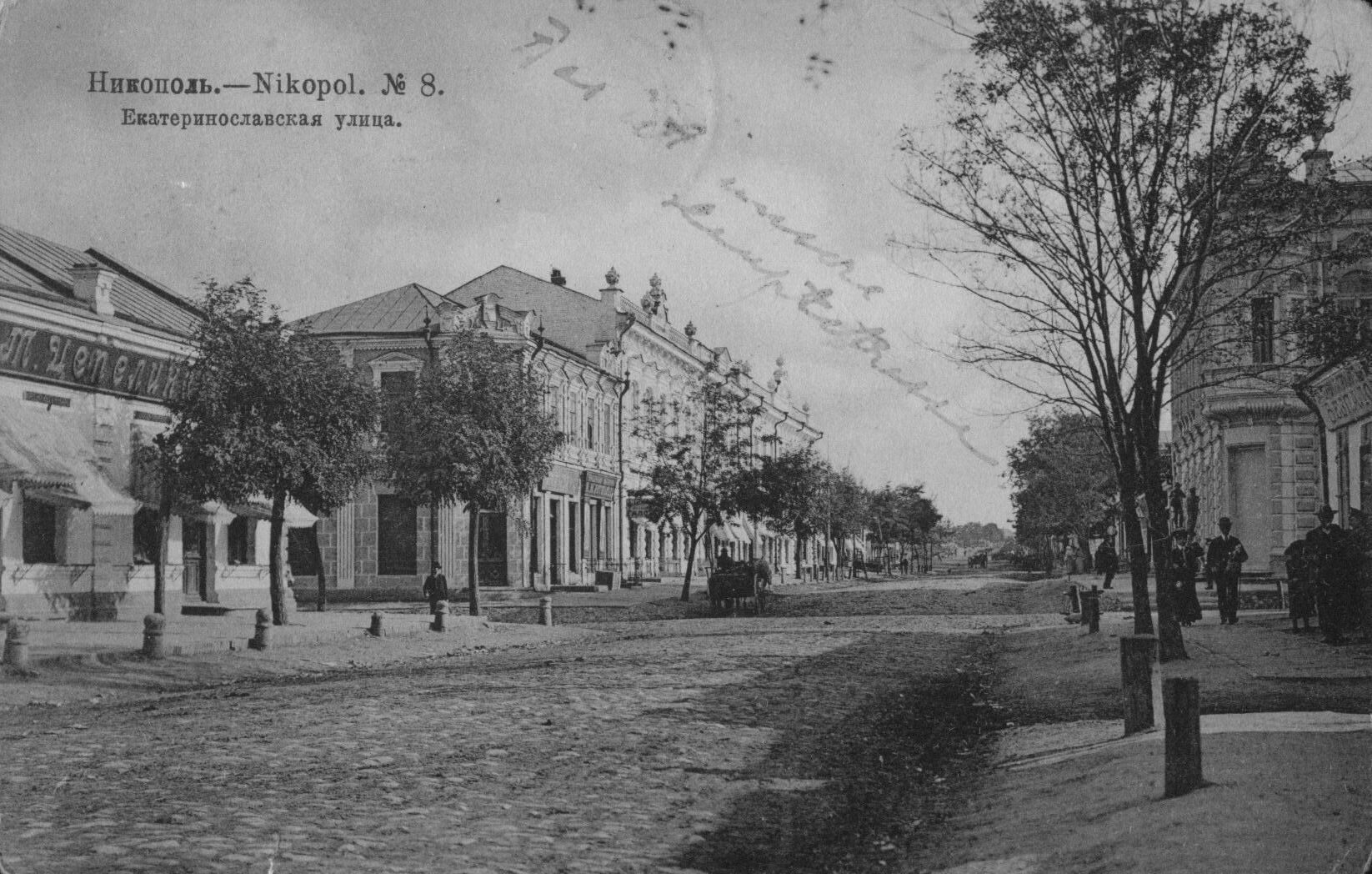
19th-century view

In the 18th century, Grigoriy Potyomkin ordered the building of an Imperial Russian fortress at Slaviansk. Eventually, the project was scrapped. Soon after the liquidation of the Zaporozhian Sich in 1782, the settlement was renamed Nikopol. During the Ukrainian War of Independence, from 1917 to 1920, it passed between various factions. Afterwards, it was administratively part of the Katerynoslav Governorate of Ukraine.

During World War II, Nikopol was occupied by the German Army until 18 February 1944. Albert Speer referred to it as the "center of manganese mining", and, therefore, of vital importance to the German war effort.

The Soviet policy of industrialization created the Kakhovka Reservoir which existed from 1956 to 2023, submerging what could be now the most sacred place of an early distinctly Ukrainian statehood: the lands of the former Zaporizhian Host, with their burial sites.

Until July 2020, Nikopol was incorporated as a city of oblast significance and served as the administrative center of Nikopol Raion, though it did not belong to the raion. In July 2020, as part of the administrative reform of Ukraine, which reduced the number of raions of Dnipropetrovsk Oblast to seven, the city of Nikopol was merged into Nikopol Raion.

Just a few kilometres west of the city, the Kosh otaman Ivan Sirko is buried.

Nikopol is one of the largest towns in the region, with a population of 105,160 in 2022. The largest manufacturers include the former Nikopol Tube Plant, established in 1931, which is now divided into smaller plants (e.g. Centravis, Interpipe Niko Tube). The Nikopol Ferroalloy Plant is the largest in Europe and the second largest in the world in the production of Ferromanganese (FeMn) and Ferrosilicomanganese (FeSiMn).

== Geography ==
=== Climate ===
Climate data for Nikopol (1991–2020)
Month	Jan	Feb	Mar	Apr	May	Jun	Jul	Aug	Sep	Oct	Nov	Dec	Year
Mean daily maximum °C (°F)	0.3 (32.5)	1.7 (35.1)	7.7 (45.9)	16.1 (61.0)	22.8 (73.0)	26.9 (80.4)	29.5 (85.1)	29.0 (84.2)	22.7 (72.9)	15.0 (59.0)	7.1 (44.8)	2.0 (35.6)	15.1 (59.2)
Daily mean °C (°F)	−2.4 (27.7)	−1.6 (29.1)	3.5 (38.3)	10.7 (51.3)	17.0 (62.6)	21.2 (70.2)	23.5 (74.3)	22.8 (73.0)	16.9 (62.4)	10.3 (50.5)	4.0 (39.2)	−0.5 (31.1)	10.5 (50.9)
Mean daily minimum °C (°F)	−4.7 (23.5)	−4.1 (24.6)	0.2 (32.4)	5.9 (42.6)	11.5 (52.7)	15.9 (60.6)	17.8 (64.0)	16.8 (62.2)	11.7 (53.1)	6.3 (43.3)	1.3 (34.3)	−2.7 (27.1)	6.3 (43.3)
Average precipitation mm (inches)	38 (1.5)	34 (1.3)	37 (1.5)	40 (1.6)	47 (1.9)	56 (2.2)	39 (1.5)	36 (1.4)	41 (1.6)	35 (1.4)	40 (1.6)	42 (1.7)	485 (19.1)
Average precipitation days (≥ 1.0 mm)	7.8	6.2	7.2	5.9	6.5	6.9	4.9	3.7	5.1	5.1	6.3	6.7	72.3
Average relative humidity (%)	85.2	81.5	75.2	65.4	63.6	63.5	60.6	58.3	66.4	75.7	83.7	86.0	72.1
Source: NOAA

== Demographics ==
Historical population
Year	Pop.	±%
1926	14,209	—
1939	58,148	+309.2%
1959	82,992	+42.7%
1970	124,949	+50.6%
1979	145,654	+16.6%
1989	157,608	+8.2%
2001	136,280	−13.5%
2011	121,784	−10.6%
2022	105,160	−13.7%

As of the 2001 Ukrainian census, Nikopol had a population of 138,218 inhabitants, of whom the majority are ethnic Ukrainians. Russians account for a quarter of the city's population, smaller Minorities are Belarusians, Germans and Jews. In terms of spoken languages, almost 60% of the population considers Ukrainian to be their first language, while roughly 40% considered Russian as their native language. The exact ethnic and linguistic composition was:

Ethnic groups in Nikopol
	percent
Ukrainians	71.27%
Russians	25.62%
Belarusians	0.70%
Jews	0.24%
Germans	0.19%
Armenians	0.16%
Tatars	0.12%
Moldovans	0.08%
Azerbaijanis	0.08%

Native languages in Nikopol
	percent
Ukrainian	56.0%
Russian	42.7%
Armenian	0.1%
Belarusian	0.1%
others	0.2%

== Transport links ==
There is bus station, railway station and river port, which connect the town with other cities.

Nikopol River Port facilitates transportation for the metallurgical industry and travel.

== Culture ==
=== Sports ===
- FC Nikopol
- FC Metalurh Nikopol

== Gallery ==
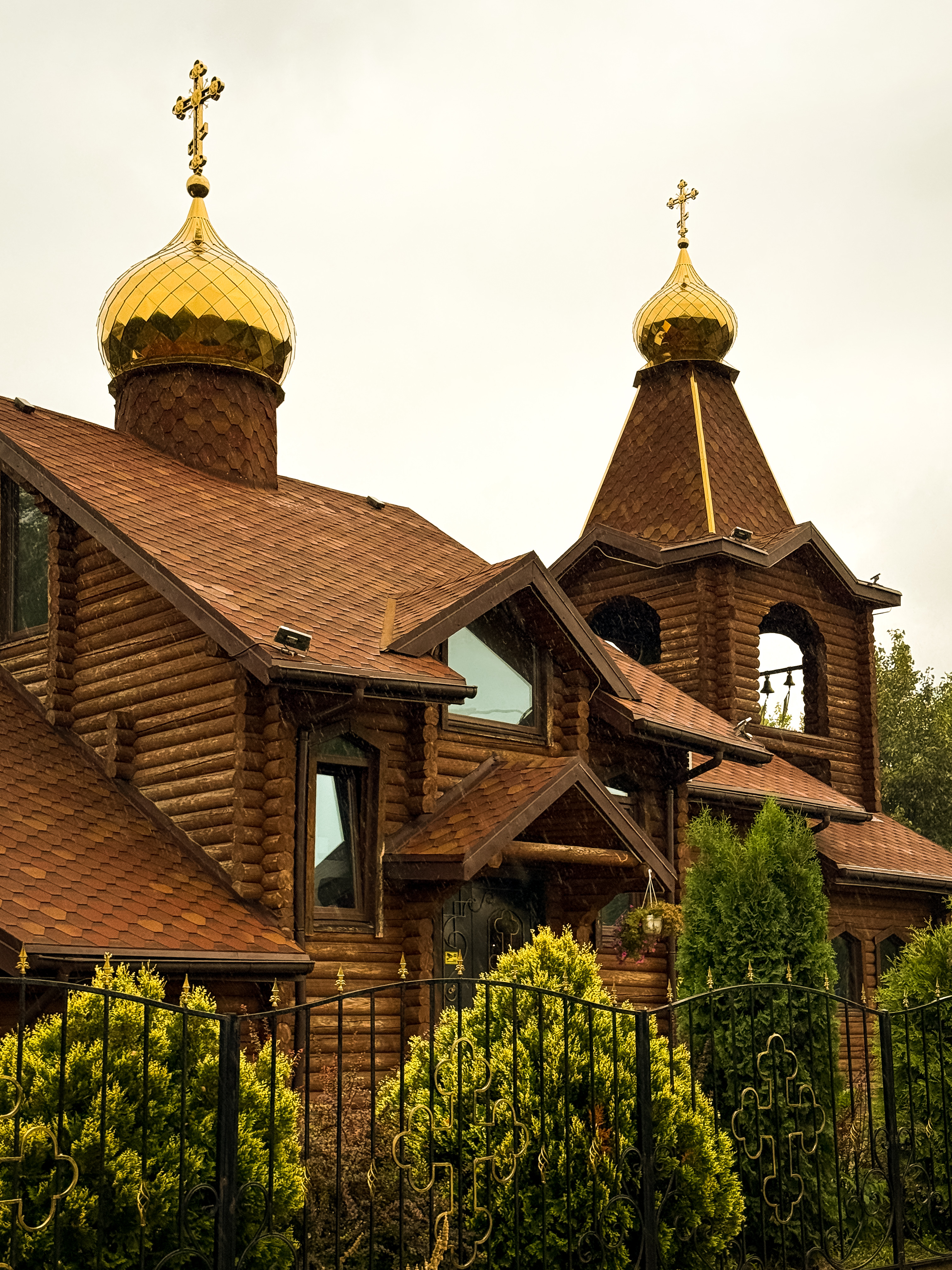
Saint Petro Kalnyshevskyi Church

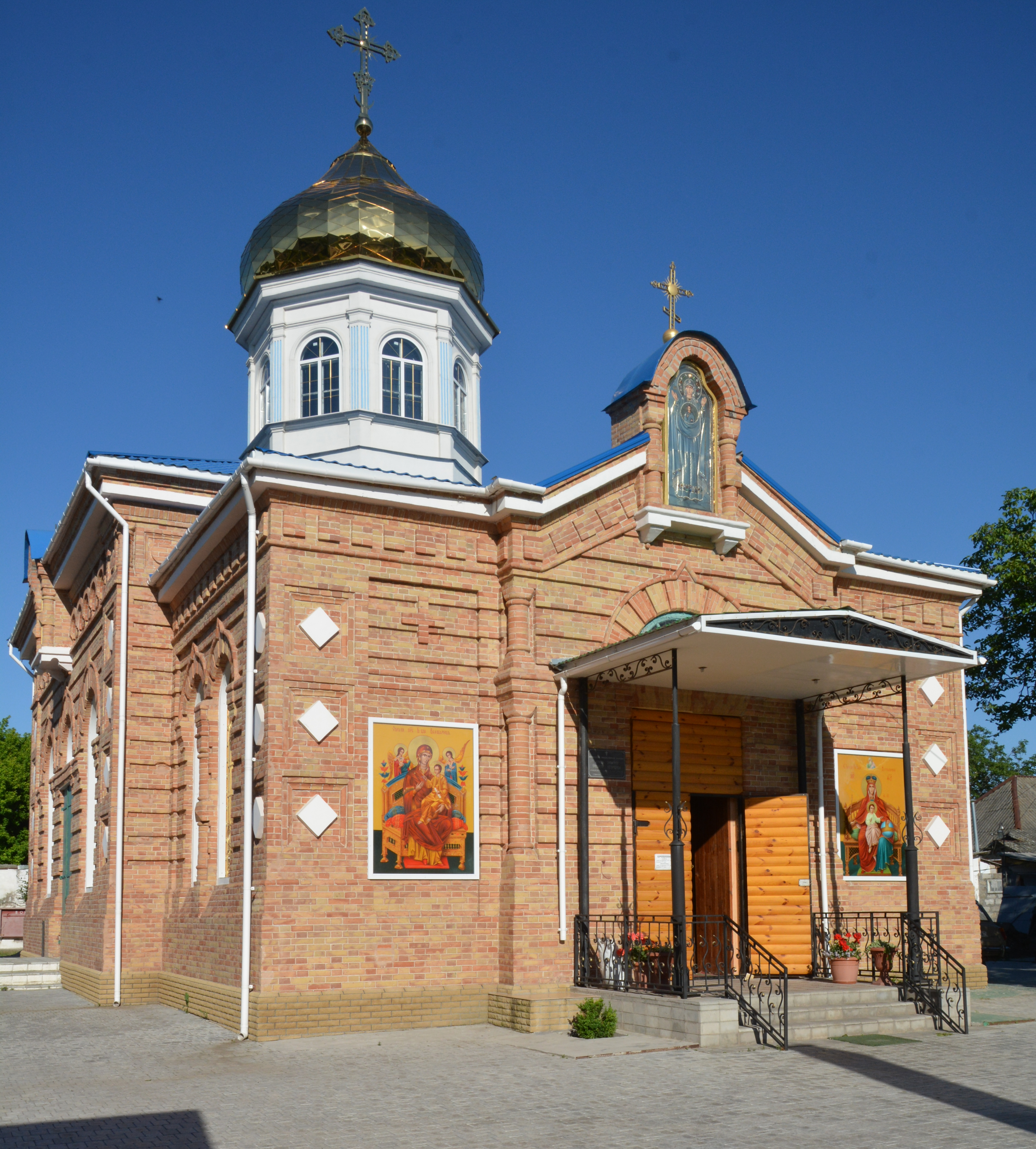
Old Believers' Church

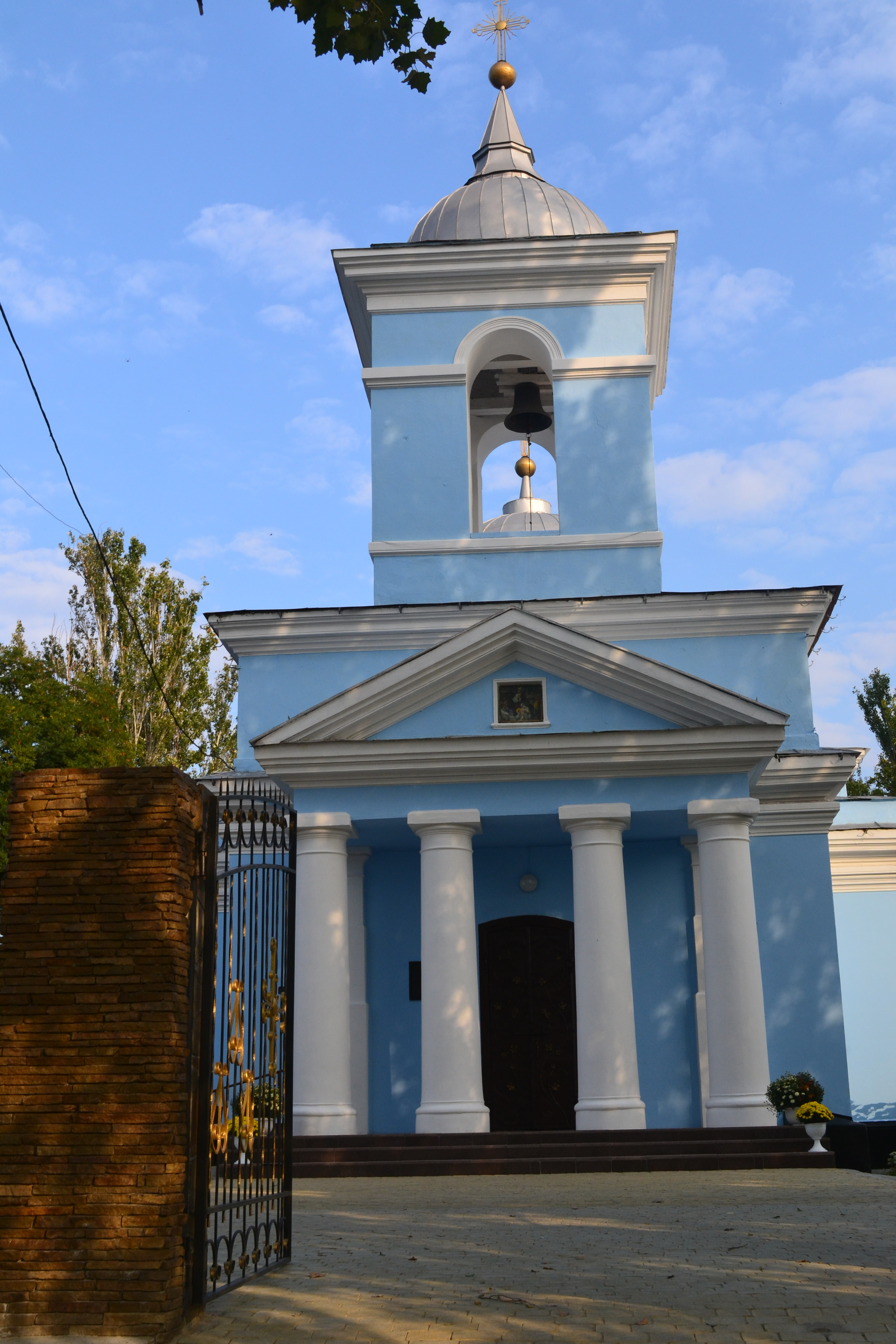
Church of the Nativity of the Virgin Mary

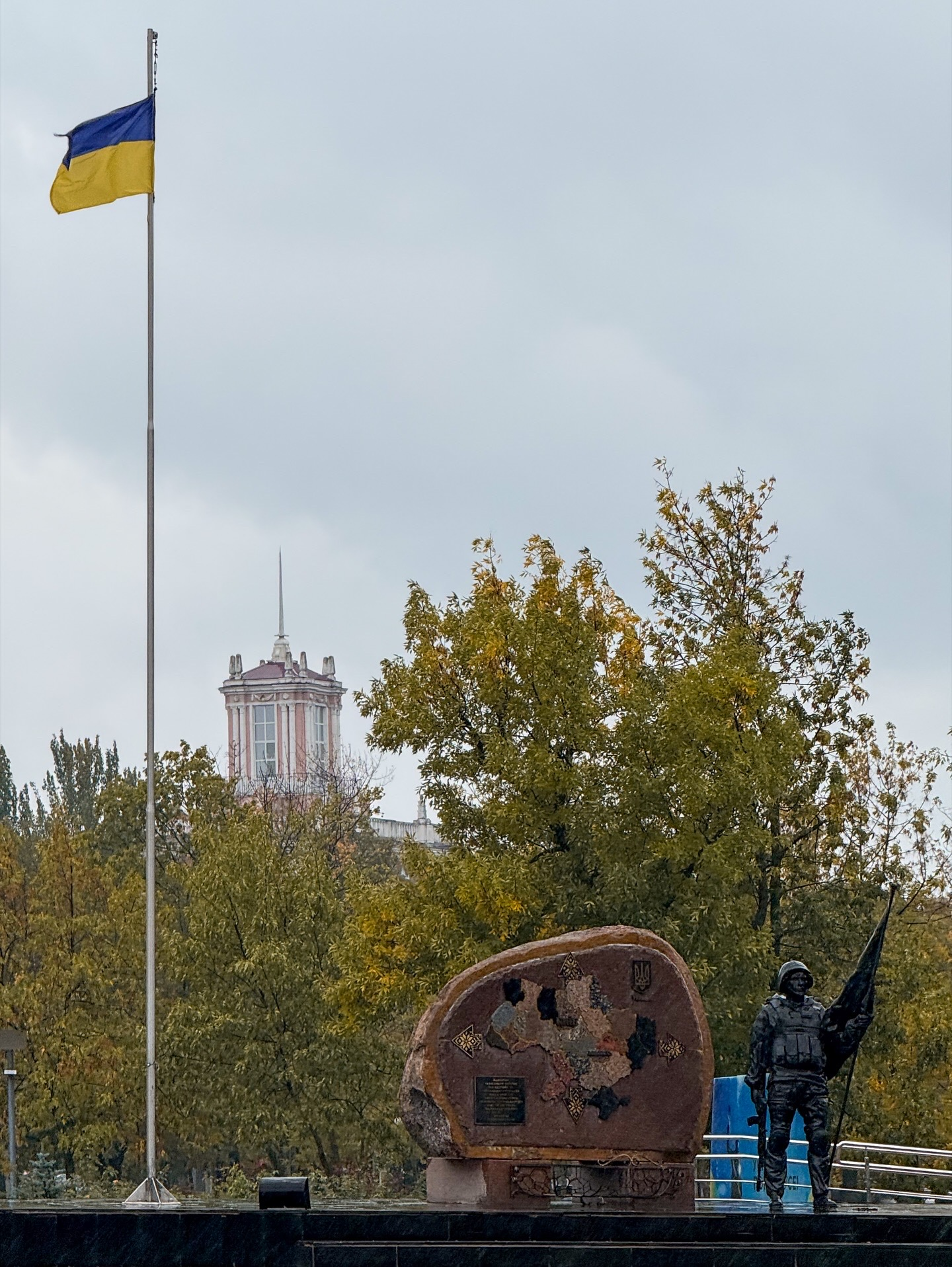
Defender of Ukraine Monument

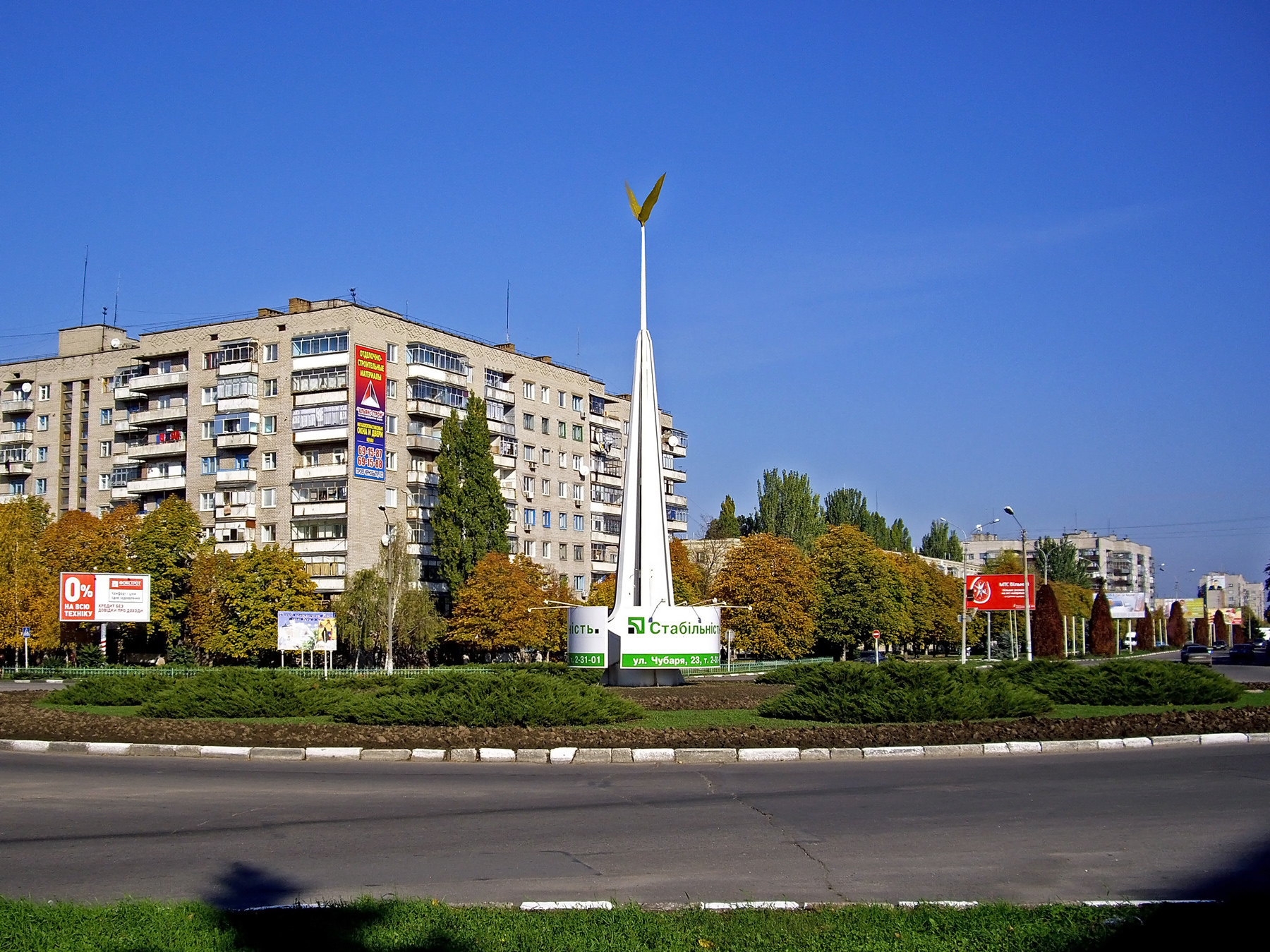
Monument to goddess Nike

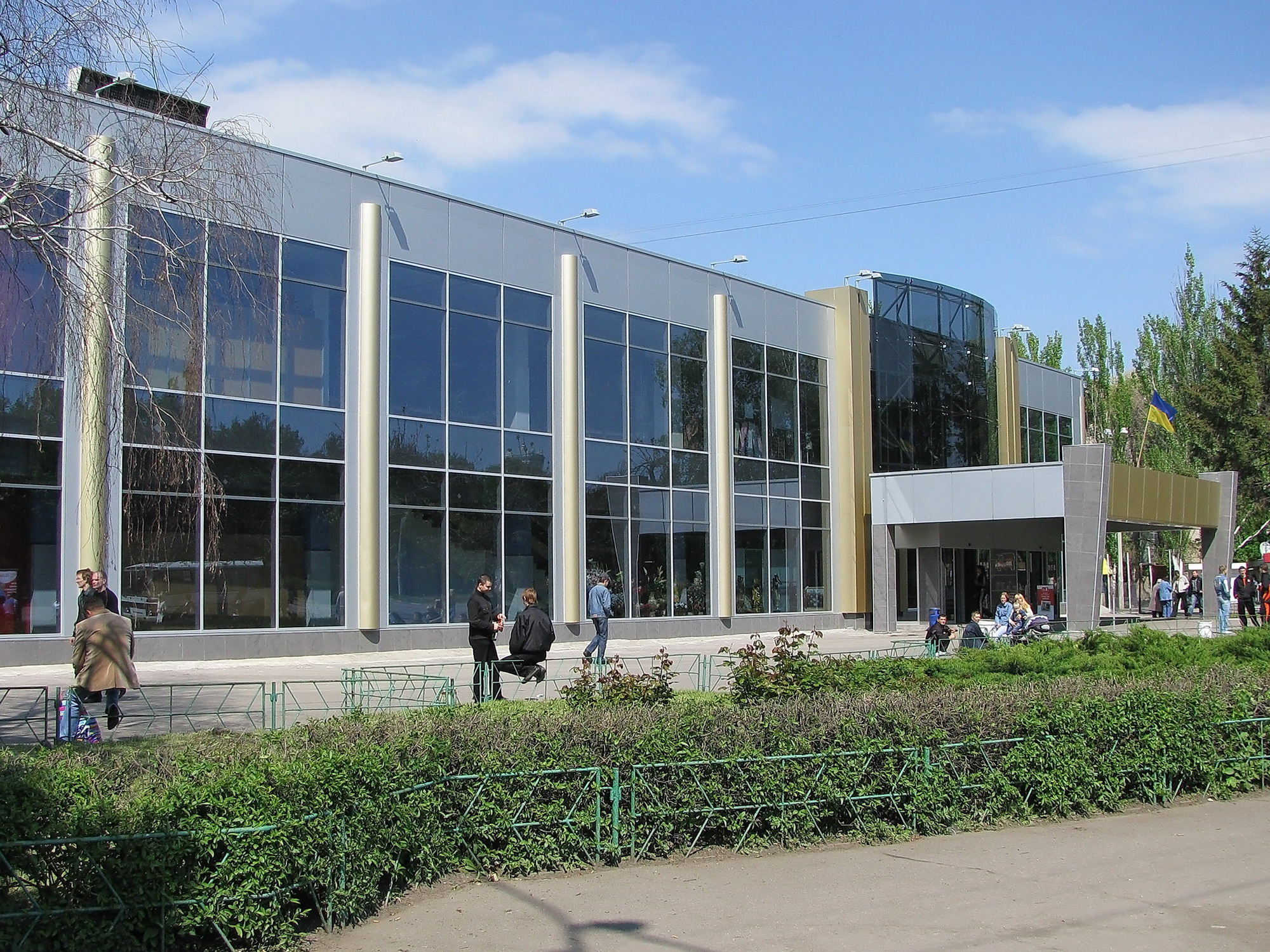
Nikopol Central Department Store

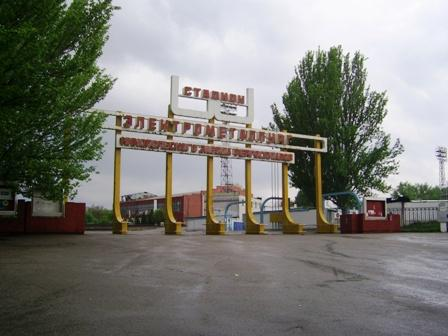
Elektrometalurh Stadium

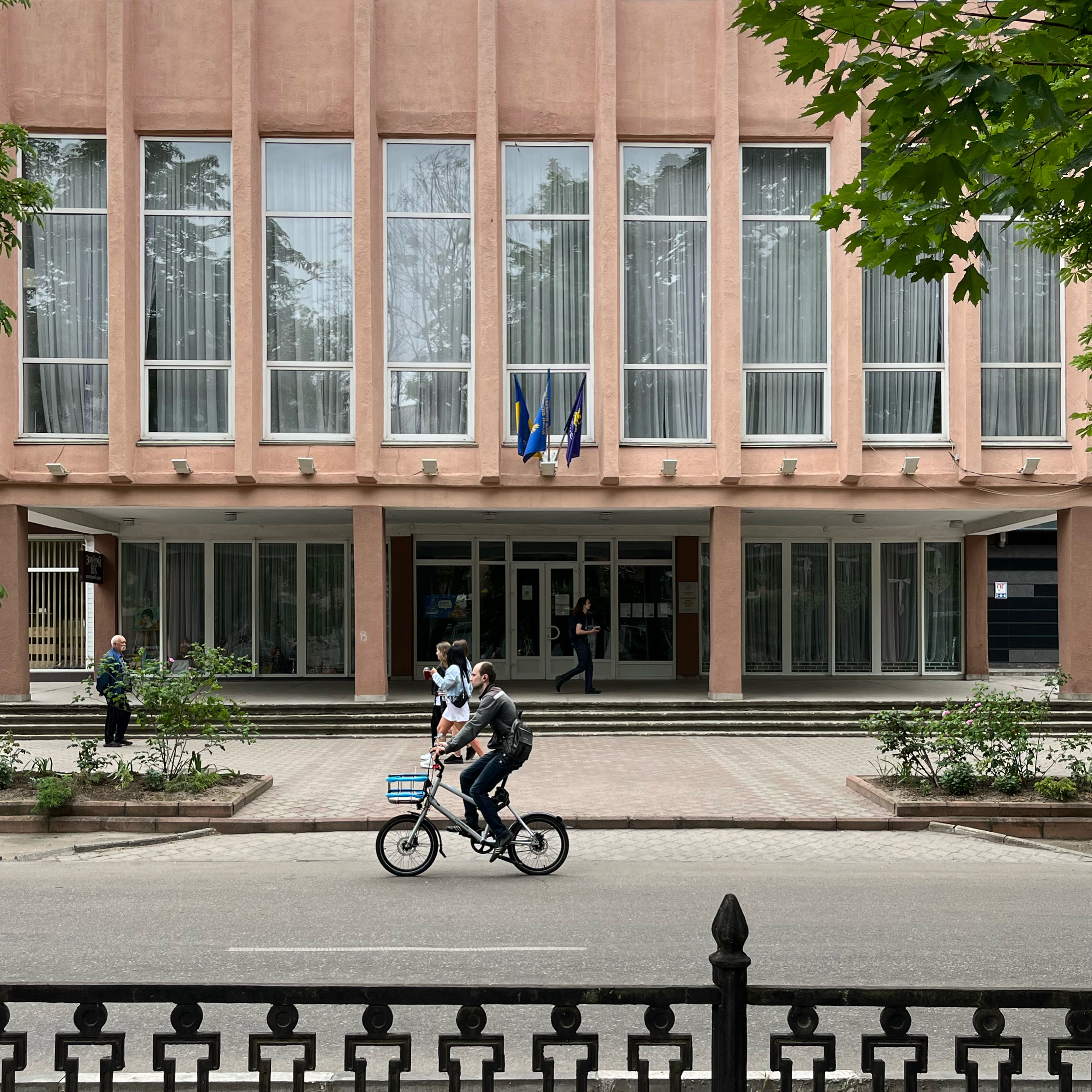
Nikopol City Civil Registry Office

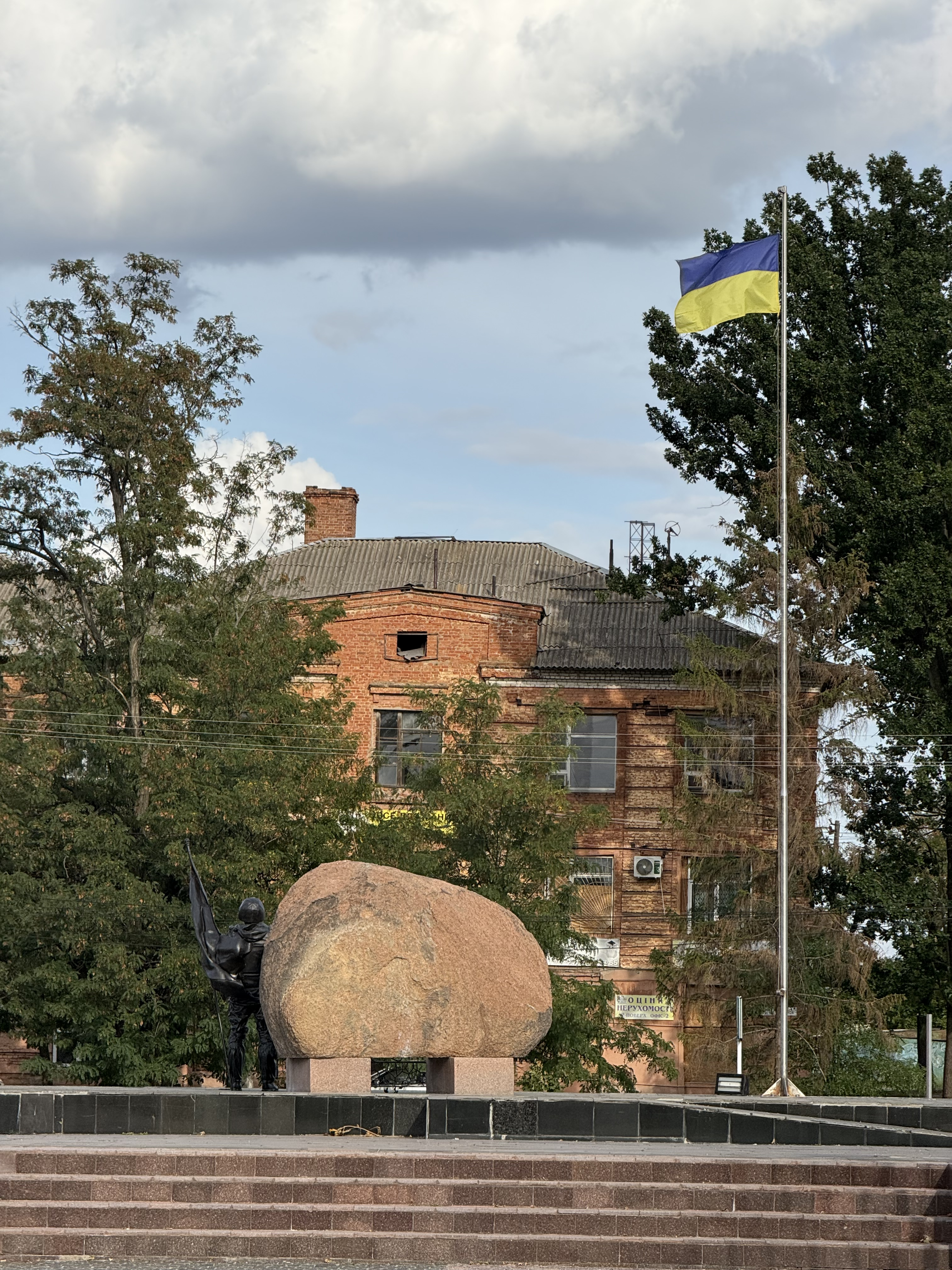
Nikopol Local History Museum

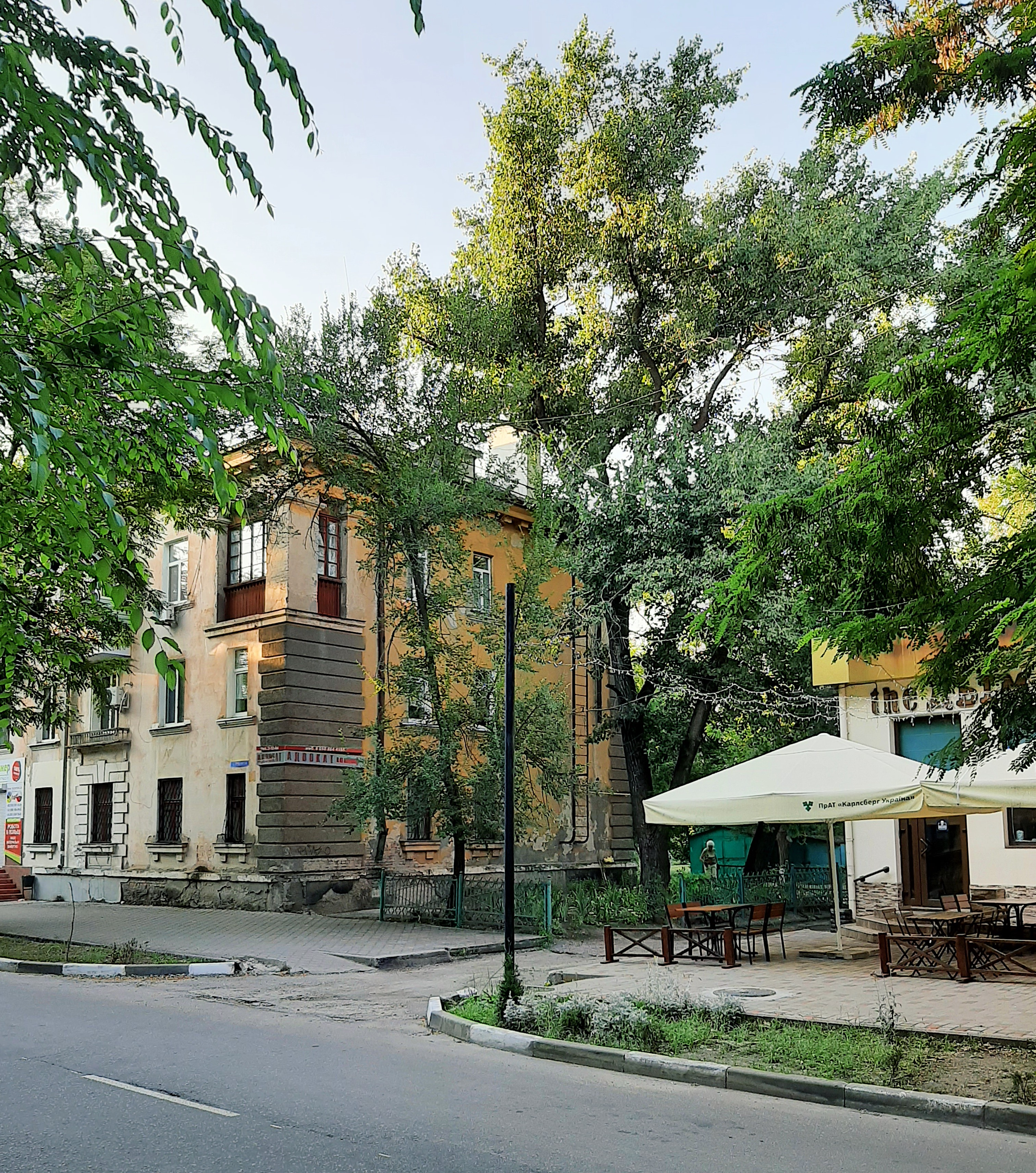
Nikopol Street

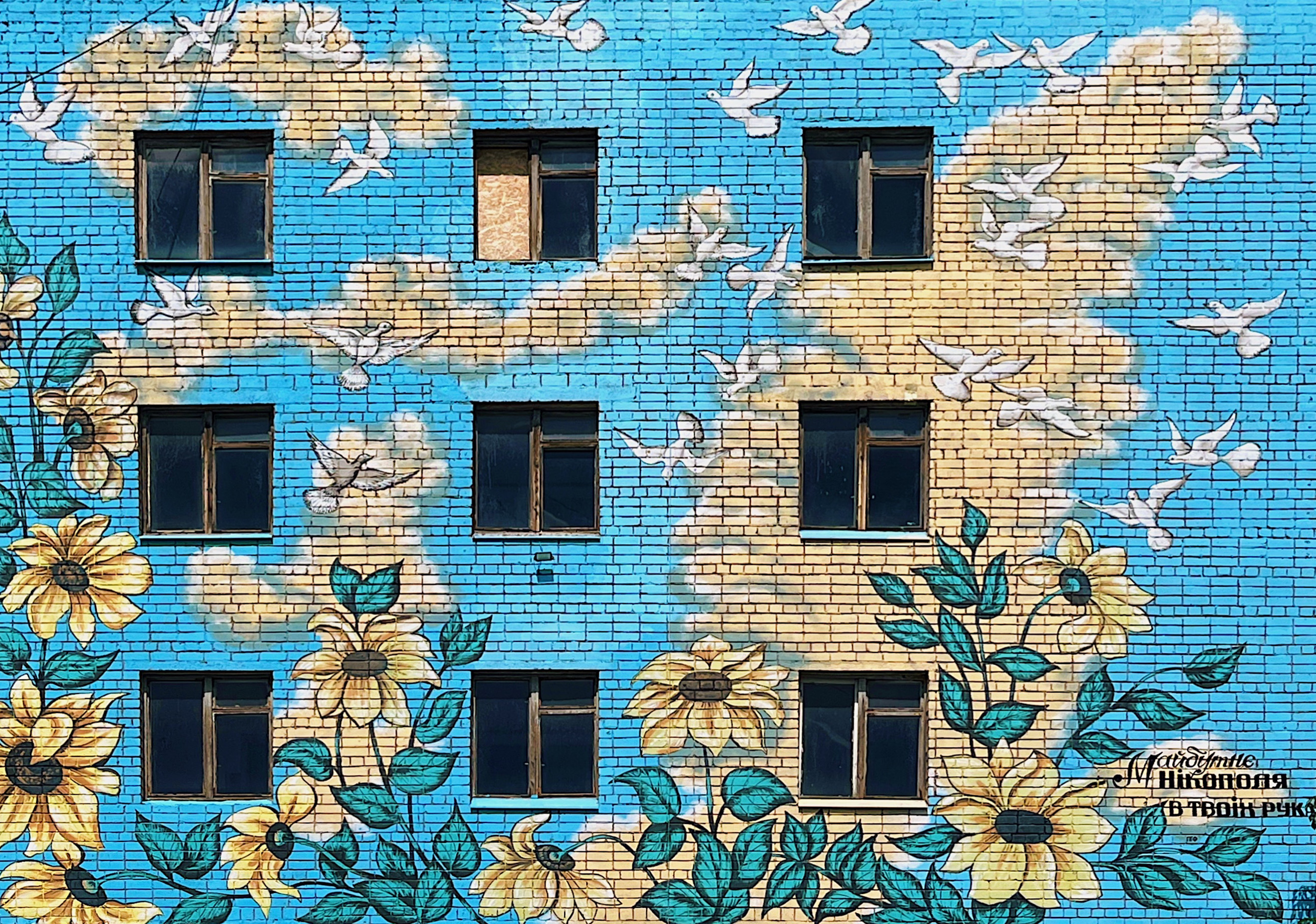
"The Future of Nikopol is in Your Hands" Mural

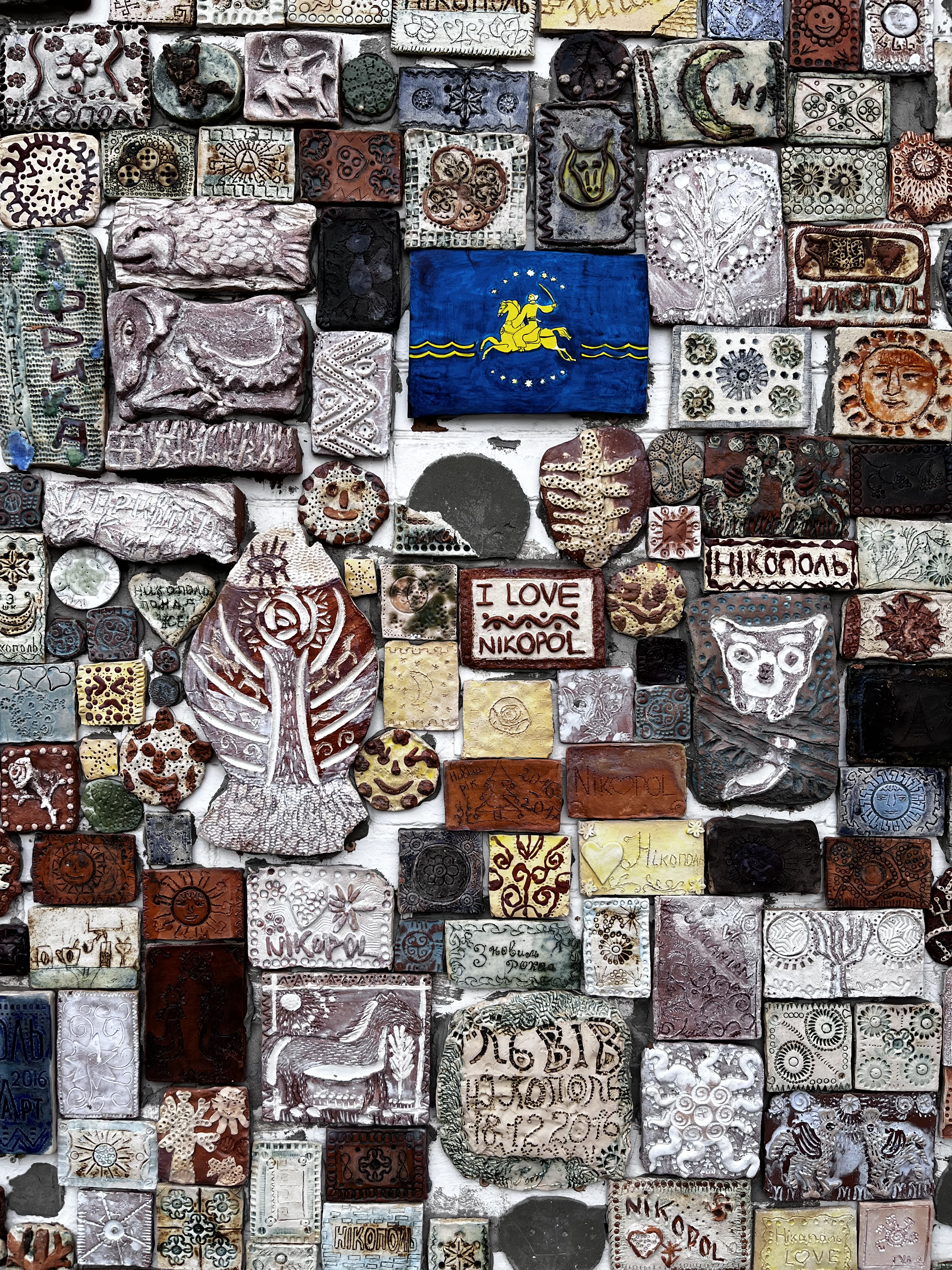
"I Love Nikopol" Wall

== Twin towns – sister cities ==
Nikopol is twinned with:

- Halmstad, Sweden
- Leverkusen, Germany
- Lloydminster, Canada
- Perth, Scotland
