= Interpipe Group =

Ukrainian industrial company

Interpipe Research, Industries & Investment Group
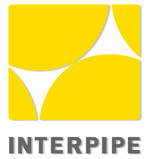
- Native name: Група «Інтерпайп»
- Romanized name: Hrupa "Interpayp"
- Type: Corporation/Holding company
- Industry: Metallurgy, Carbon Steel Pipes production, Train wheel production, Axle production, Wheelset assembly, Steel billets production
- Founded: 1990
- Founder: Viktor Pinchuk
- Headquarters: Dnipro, Nikopol, Ukraine
- Area served: International (invests in industries of different countries)
- Key people: Viktor Pinchuk, Gennady Gazin
- Products: Steel pipe, Railway wheel, Tyre, Axle, Wheelset, Steel billet
- Services: Asset management, investment, trading and consulting
- Owner: Viktor Pinchuk

Interpipe Group, or simply Interpipe, is a Ukrainian industrial company, a global producer of steel pipes and railway wheels. Interpipe headquarters and production facilities are located in Nikopol, Ukraine. The network of sales offices covers the key markets of Ukraine, CIS, Middle East, North America, and Europe.

Interpipe is a globally important player in carbon steel pipes (hence the name), hollow structural sections, train wheels and steel billets markets.

In 2020, Interpipe sold 469,900 tons of pipes and 192,400 tons of railway products. In-house steel production amounted to 759,000 tons.

11 000 employees work at Interpipe.

== History ==
In 1932 the factory began producing drilling pipes, and by 1933, it employed 7,020 workers and 420 engineers.

It was destroyed during World War II. The factory's reconstruction began in 1943, and production was entirely resumed by 1948. The plant operated under the name Karl Liebknecht until the collapse of the USSR and Ukraine's subsequent independence.

In 1990 the Interpipe group was founded and the factory became a key asset of the company.

In 2012, Interpipe launched the steel factory with a production capacity of 1.32 million tons per year. The mill was equipped with an electric furnace for generating steel from scrap metal produced from the waste of pipe and rail wheel production. The construction took 5 years and cost $700 million.

Interpipe began supplying steel to the United Arab Emirates (UAE) market in the early 2000s with up to 16% of global sales coming from this region. In early 2016, the company registered its trademark in the UAE.

Also in 2016, Interpipe completed a $16.2 million upgrade to facilities in Dnipro with a focus on increased railway related products and production.

In mid-2016 the company announced plans to expand its business presence in Qatar.

Awarded a long-term contract in 2016, in 2017, Interpipe delivered an initial order of 3,000 wheels to the Saudi Railways Organization (SRO).

In 2017, in an effort to combat counterfeiting of steel products, Interpipe introduced an online verification service that customer may utilize to authenticate their steel products.

Also in 2018, Interpipe started the pilot operation of a new line for pipe finishing at Interpipe Niko Tube in Nikopol (the Dnipropetrovsk Oblast of Ukraine). The company invested approximately $8 million into the line construction.

In 2022, Interpipe increased production of oil well equipment and railway wheels by 60% compared to the same period in 2021, before the Russo-Ukrainian war had started.

In November 2023, due to the blockade of the Ukrainian-Polish border crossings, Interpipe lost $1.2 million.

In 2024, Fitch assigned Interpipe a rating of "CCC-". The main negative factor mentioned by Fitch is the high risk associated with the ongoing Russo-Ukrainian war, as the company's main assets are located near the front line. As a positive factor, Fitch noted Interpipe's financial performance.

In 2024, the Swiss company KLW Wheelco delivered a party of 2,000 steel wheels to India manufactured by Interpipe. The wheels were intended for Indian Railways. It was the first shipment from Ukraine to India since the onset of the Russo-Ukrainian war and took place following India's Prime Minister Narendra Modi's visit to Kyiv.

== Company structure ==
The Interpipe Group owns the following assets:

- Interpipe NTZ — is located in Dnipro city, Ukraine, and produces pipes for manufacturing and industrial needs, railway wheels, and railway tires.
- Interpipe Novomoskovskyi Trubnyi Zavod (Interpipe Novomoskovsk Pipe Plant) — is located in Samar (former Novomoskovsk), Dnipropetrovsk region, Ukraine. The plant produces steel pipes of different diameters for electric welding, components for welding, as well as items for everyday use.
- Interpipe Vtormet is located in Dnipro city and specializes in processing of scrap metal.
- Interpipe Niko Tube

=== Employees ===
Interpipe Group employs around 11,000 people. Since the start of the Russo-Ukrainian war, close to 10% of employees have been drafted into the Armed Forces of Ukraine.

== Markets ==
=== USA ===
In 2014, the U.S. Department of Commerce and Interpipe signed a price undertaking agreement on pipe products. This agreement resulted from an anti-dumping investigation into Interpipe's activities in the U.S. market and required Ukrainian pipes to be sold at a fixed price. This agreement was renewed annually but ended in 2019 as it was not extended.

In July 2021, the U.S. government imposed an anti-dumping duty of 23.75%, leading Interpipe to announce its exit from the market.

In 2023, the Ukrainian government reported the removal of all anti-dumping restrictions.

However, in the summer of 2024, the U.S. government imposed a new anti-dumping duty of 4.99%. This decision followed an investigation initiated by Vallourec Star, which found that Interpipe had sold approximately 40,000 tons of pipes in the U.S. in 2019 at dumping prices totaling over $40 million.

=== EU ===
Interpipe's presence in European markets was limited by quotas and anti-dumping duties that the EU imposed to protect its domestic markets. In 2018, the European Commission reduced the anti-dumping duty on Interpipe's pipes from 13.8% to 8.1%.

That same year, Interpipe and the French company Vallourec announced the establishment of a joint venture for exporting seamless pipes to EU markets. This agreement was supported by the Antimonopoly Committees of Germany and Ukraine. However, at the end of 2021, Interpipe and Vallourec terminated the agreement.

In October 2023, the European Commission announced the end of anti-dumping restrictions on pipe products from Ukraine. In the second quarter of 2023, the company's sales growth to EU countries reached 44% (approximately 46,000 tons).

In the summer of 2024, Interpipe signed a contract with Greenbrier for the supply of railway wheels. In the first half of the year, Interpipe produced 43.5 tons of wheel products.

=== Middle East ===
In 2007, Interpipe sold $86.4 million worth of products in the Middle Eastern markets, expecting further growth.

The company opened its headquarters in Dubai, the United Arab Emirates, in the same year. By the 10th anniversary of the office in Dubai, Interpipe had supplied over 1 million tons of products to the region.

Since late 2013 to early 2014, Interpipe has been actively operating in Iraq. In 2023, the company delivered 850 tons of casing and pump-compressor pipes to the country.

In 2017, Interpipe along with Saudi Arabia's Ministry of Commerce and Industry registered a new trademark to take action against fake steel products in Middle Eastern markets. Also, Interpipe joined the Steel Alliance Against Counterfeiting which aimed to protect the Middle East market from counterfeit and non-certified steel products. The Alliance was created in 2015 and united 18 steel manufacturers with around $20 billion turnover.

In 2023, Interpipe resumed cooperation with Qatar Petroleum, which had been suspended due to the start of the Russia-Ukraine war. Throughout the year, Interpipe shipped over 4,000 tons of products to its partners.

== Criticism ==
=== Quality problems ===
In June 2023, Ukrnafta issued a tender for casing pipe. Roughly 80% of the pipe supplied by Interpipe in response to a contract signed under this tender were rejected for poor quality. This pipe was deemed totally unusable due to severe issues with threading. Interpipe was the only company that responded to the tender. An industry expert called the supplied materials "scrap metal" and blamed Ukraine's Ministry of Economy for allowing Interpipe to exercise de facto monopoly power over the steel pipe market.

=== Over-pricing investigation ===
As of August 2024, Interpipe was involved in a pre-trial investigation by the Ukrainian government regarding the overpricing of casing pipes, causing substantial damage to the state. Officials from Ukranafta are nominally the subjects of the investigation. The National Anti-Corruption Bureau of Ukraine (NABU) conducted the investigation. During a raid, NABU seized a mobile phone from an Interpipe director. The phone was encrypted. The NABU sought and received permission from the High Anti-Corruption Court (HACC) to crack the phone. The phone belonged to Denys Morozov. The HACC determined in a pre-trial ruling that the overpricing, amounting to about UAH 18 million, was conducted through the abuse of transfer pricing by subsidiaries of Interpipe and other companies.

=== Russia ===
Interpipe's subsidiary in Russia is known as Interpipe-M. In 2022 alone, Interpipe-M had a revenue of 131.66 million rubles and paid 36 million rubles to the Russian Federation in income tax. Interpipe also continued operating in Russia after the limited invasion of Ukraine in 2014. In 2017 and 2018, the company earned about $200 million for each year. Interpipe's financial filings are publicly available online from Russian government websites. These filings list Interpipe's business locations, tax payments, senior executives in Russia, certain expenses, etc. Both the Russian and Ukrainian subsidiaries of Interpipe are owned by the Cypriot company Interpipe Ltd. which is in turn owned by another Cypriot entity called Interpipe Holdings PLC. Through a complicated web of other companies, Interpipe is primarily owned by Viktor Pinchuk.

However, Interpipe denied all claims about being present on the Russian market following the full-scale invasion of Ukraine. The company stated that after February 24, 2022, it was not involved in any business operations in Russia and launched the elimination process of the subsidiary trading company.
