= History of the Cossacks =

The history of the Cossacks concerns the development of semi autonomous, militarised communities that emerged in the steppe regions north of the Black and Caspian seas from the late medieval period onwards. Composed largely of fugitives, frontier settlers, adventurers, these groups distinctive socio political organizations characterised by elective leadership, military proficiency and a strong tradition of personal liberty over time the Cossacks played a significant role in the political and military affairs of Eastern Europe, particularly in relation to the Polish Lithuanian commonwealth, the Ottoman empire and the expanding Russian state. while they at times incorporated into imperial structure of frontier troops, they also periodically resisted central authority, before their autonomy was progressively curtailed under imperial law.

== Early history ==
Several theories speculate about the origins of the Cossacks. According to one theory, Cossacks have Slavic origins, while another theory states that the Constitution of Pylyp Orlyk of 1710 attests to Khazar origins. Modern scholars believe that Cossacks have both Slavic and Turkic origins. The Academician Ivan Zabelin mentioned that peoples of the prairies and of the woods had always needed "a live frontier", and even ancient Borisphenites (Dnieper Scythians) and Tanaites could be the predecessors of the Cossacks, not only the Khazars who may have assimilated, but this also includes the Severians, Goths, Scythians, and other ancient inhabitants, as insisted by Cossack folklore, by the Constitution of Pylyp Orlyk, and by numerous Cossack historians. Because of the need of both the Soviet and the anti-Bolshevik forces to deny any separate Cossack ethnicity, the traditional post-imperial historiography dates the emergence of Cossacks to the 14th-15th centuries. Non-mainstream theories, however, have borrowed the date 948 from imperial historiography, and ascribe an earlier Cossack existence to the tenth century, but deny Cossack links both to "the old people" (Khazars) and to "the new people" (Russians and Ukrainians; the very terms "old people" and "new people" being coined by the 11th-century Metropolitan Ilarion of Kiev), specifically mentioning 948 as the year when the inhabitants of the steppe under a leader named Kasak or Kazak routed the Khazars in the area of modern Kuban and organized a state called Kazakia or Cossackia.

Cossacks were mainly East Slavs. In the 15th century, the term originally described semi-independent Tatar groups which lived on the Dnieper River, which flows through Ukraine, Russia, and Belarus.

Some historians suggest that the Cossack people had mixed ethnic origins, descending from Russians, Khazars, Ukrainians, Tatars, and others who settled or passed through the boundless Pontic–Caspian steppeland that stretches from central Asia to southeastern Europe.

Some Turkologists argue that Cumania's Cossacks descend from Kipchaks, who partly originated near the northern Chinese borders and soon moved to Western Siberia. Afterwards they migrated further west into the trans-Volga region (present-day western Kazakhstan). In the 11th century they finally arrived in the steppe area north of the Black Sea in southern Russia and eastern Ukraine. They are closely related to modern Kazakhs.

Genetic studies conducted on Zaporozhian, Don and Kuban Cossack groups showed low levels to absence of Caucasian and Asian component. Y-chromosomal genetic makeup of these groups forms southern fragment of East Slavic population.

Early Russian military greatly admired Cossacks for their equestrian skills. Many were hired as cavalry by Russian and Ukrainian warlords, in much the same way that they hired Black Klobuks as personal guards.

After 1400, the Cossacks emerge as an established and identifiable group in historical accounts. Rulers of the Grand Duchy of Moscow and of the Polish–Lithuanian Commonwealth employed Cossacks as mobile guards against Tatar raids from the south in the territories of present-day southern Russia and eastern Ukraine. Judging by the records of their names, these early Cossacks seem to have included a significant number of Tatar descendants. From the mid-15th century, Cossacks are mostly mentioned with Slavic names.

All historical records of that period describe Cossack society as a loose federation of independent communities, often merging into larger units of a military character, entirely separate from, and mostly independent of other nations (such as Poland, Ukraine, Russia, Kazakhstan, Mongolia, or the Tatars).

In the 16th century, Cossack societies created two relatively independent territorial organisations:

- Zaporizhia, on the lower bends of the river Dnieper in Ukraine, between Russia, Poland, and the Tatars of the Crimea, with their centre as the Zaporozhian Sich
- the Don Cossack State, on the river Don, separated from the Russian state by rebel Nogai and Tatar tribes.

== Don Cossacks ==
Numerous historical documents of that period refer to the Don Cossacks in Russia as a sovereign ethno-cultural people with a unique warrior culture. Cossacks conducted raids and pillaging against their neighbours as important sources of income. Already in 1444 Cossacks of Ryazan were mentioned as defenders of Pereslavl-Zalessky against the units of Golden Horde and in a letter of Ivan III of Russia in 1502. The area around the Don River was divided between the Crimean west side and the Nogai east side after the Golden Horde fell in 1480. The vast steppe of the Don region was populated by runaway serfs, by those who longed for freedom, by people who were not satisfied with the existing social order. Over time, the culture of the Don Cossacks was formed into a united community and were called "the Cossacks".

The Don Cossacks known for their attacks on the Ottoman Empire and its vassals (like the Tatars), although they did not shy away from pillaging other neighbouring communities. Their actions exacerbated the tension at the southern border of the Polish–Lithuanian Commonwealth (Kresy), resulting in almost constant low-level warfare in those territories for almost the entire existence of the Commonwealth. Their first recorded naval raid into the Black Sea dates to 1538, with an attack on the fortress of Ochakiv. This was followed by more frequent and better-organised raids elsewhere, the freeing of Christian slaves being one of the chief aims, as well as the acquisition of plunder. Their success was such that they attracted the attention of the western European powers, including the Papacy, who made diplomatic overtures in the hope of launching joint ventures against the Turks. In 1539, Grand Prince Vasili III of Russia asked the Ottoman Sultan to curb the Cossacks and the Sultan replied: "The Cossacks do not swear allegiance to me, and they live as they themselves please." In 1549, the Tsar of Russia, Ivan the Terrible, replied to a request of the Turkish Sultan to stop the aggressive actions of the Don Cossacks, stating, "The Cossacks of the Don are not my subjects, and they go to war or live in peace without my knowledge."

== Polish–Lithuanian Commonwealth ==
Similar exchanges passed between Russia, the Ottomans and the Commonwealth; each of which often tried to use the Cossacks' warmongering for his own purposes. The Cossacks for their part were happy to plunder everybody more or less equally. Between the 16th to the 17th century, the Zaporoijan Cossacks became subjects first of the Grand Duchy of Lithuania, and later of the Union of Lublin of the Polish–Lithuanian Commonwealth.

Using small, shallow-draft, and highly manoeuvrable galleys known as chaiky, they moved swiftly across the Black Sea. According to the Cossacks' own records, these vessels, carrying a 50- to 70-man crew, could reach the Anatolian coast of Asia Minor from the mouth of the Dnieper River in forty hours. The chaiky were often accompanied by larger galleys that served as command and control centres. The raids also acquired a distinct political purpose after Petro Konashevych-Sahaidachny became hetman in 1613, intending to turn the host into the nucleus of a Ukrainian nation with the support of the European states.

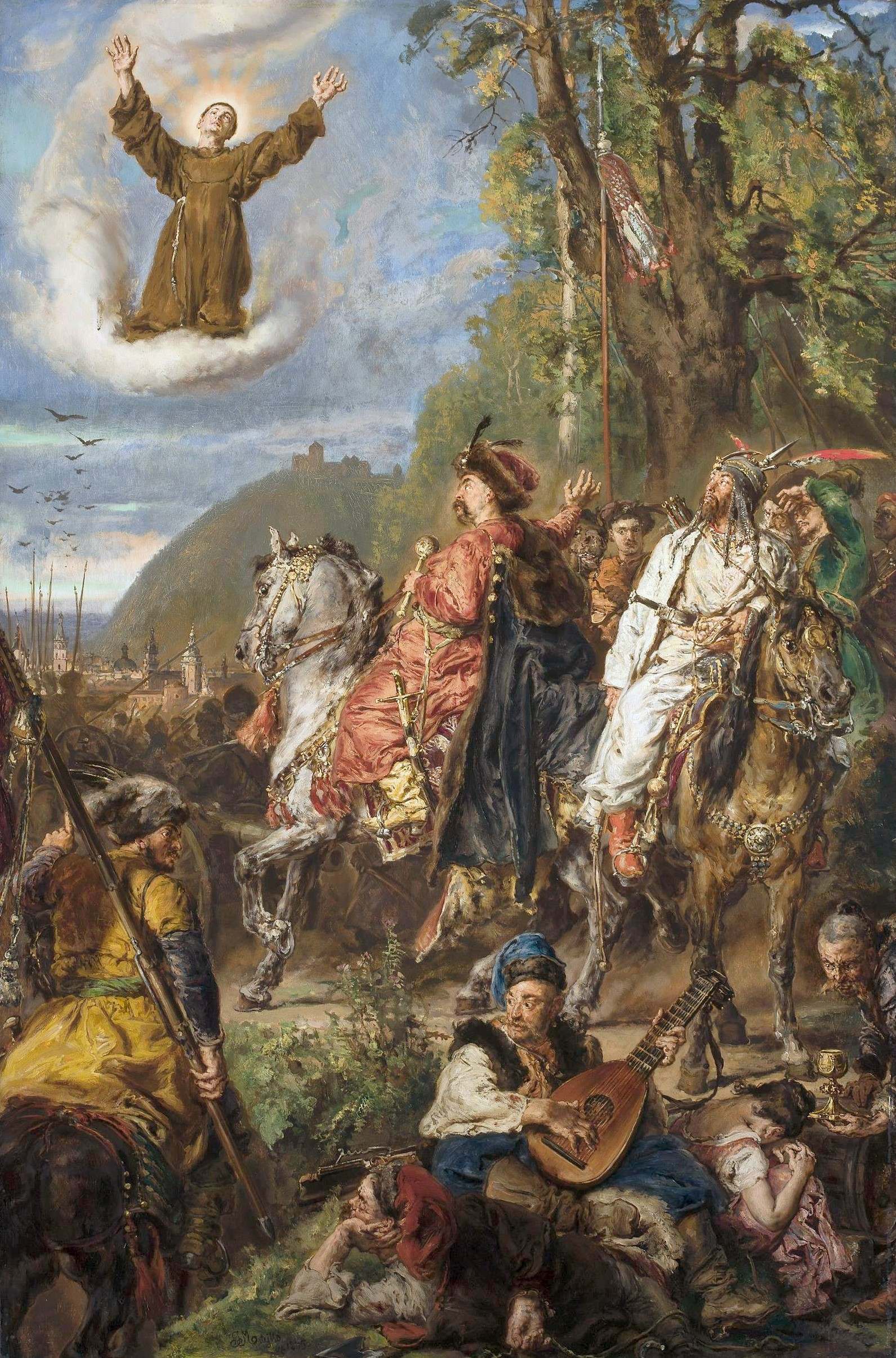
"Bohdan Khmelnytsky with Tugay Bey at Lviv", oil on canvas, 1885, National Museum in Warsaw. Khmelnytsky Uprising 1648–1654. Painted by Jan Matejko

By 1618, the Zaporozhians were members of the Anti-Turkish League, as Schaidachny transferred his seat of power to Kiev, the Polish Crown's regional capital.

The fighting qualities of the sea-going Cossacks were even admired in the Ottoman chronicles: "One can safely say that in the entire world one cannot find a people more careless for their lives or having less fear of death; persons versed in navigation assert that because of their skill and boldness in naval battles these bands are more dangerous than any other enemy."

In 1615, the raiders even sailed to the walls of Tsarhorod, as they referred to the Turkish capital, plundering the ports of Mizevna and Archioca. An attempt by the Turks to blockade the Berezan Island, and deny Cossacks access to the sea, was defeated in the spring of 1616. The raiders went on to capture Kaffa, which was burned down after all the slaves were freed. That same year Trebizond, in eastern Anatolia, was captured and destroyed. Sultan Ahmed I sent his fleet to the Dnieper in pursuit; but instead of going home the Cossacks once more sailed to Constantinople, where they raided at leisure, even rampaging through the Topkapı Palace, according to one account. The city was raided four more times, once in 1620 and no fewer than three times in 1624.

After 1624, the Zaporozhian raids gradually died out, as the Cossacks began to devote more and more of their martial energies to land-based campaigns, fighting on one side and then the other during such conflicts as the Thirty Years' War. Their numbers expanded with immigration from Poland proper and Lithuania. Szlachta failure to regard Zaporozhian Cossacks as nobles for inclusion in the registry of professional military cossacks eroded the Cossacks' loyalty towards the Commonwealth. The Cossack attempts to be recognized as equal to the szlachta were rebuffed and plans for transforming the Two-Nations Commonwealth (Polish–Lithuanian) into Three Nations (with Cossacks/Ruthenian people) were limited to a minority view. After the civil war of 1648 (or Rebellion from the Polish viewpoint) the Zaporozhian Host gained control of parts of Ukraine in 1649, although they at various time acknowledged the Polish King over the following decades.

There were several Cossack uprisings against the Commonwealth in the early 17th century. The largest of them was the Khmelnytsky Uprising, which together with The Deluge is considered as one of the events that brought an end to the Golden Age of the Commonwealth. This uprising distanced Cossacks from the Commonwealth sphere of influence, only to make them subject to the Tsardom of Russia under the Treaty of Pereyaslav (1654), and established their realm as Left-bank Ukraine in 1667 under the Treaty of Andrusovo, and the Eternal Peace Treaty of 1686.

== Ukraine and Tsarist Russia ==
After this point, the Cossack nation of the Zaporozhian Host was divided into two semi-autonomous republics within the Russian state: the Hetmanate on the Dnieper's left bank, and the more independent Zaporozhia to the south. A Cossack organization was also established in the Russian colony of Sloboda Ukraine.

These organizations gradually lost their independence, and were abolished by Catherine II by the late 18th century. The Hetmanate became the governorship of Little Russia, and Sloboda Ukraine the Kharkiv province. After having its capital, the Sich, similar to Ukrainian capitals Chigirin and Baturyn destroyed and relocated more than once, Zaporozhia was absorbed into New Russia.

The Cossacks that wanted to continue their lifestyle moved either to Ottoman and/or Austrian controlled territories on the Danube or after life on Bug and Dniester to the Kuban region, where they live to this date (see Kuban Cossacks)

== Tsarist Russia and Russian Empire ==
This section derives originally from the 1911 Encyclopædia Britannica

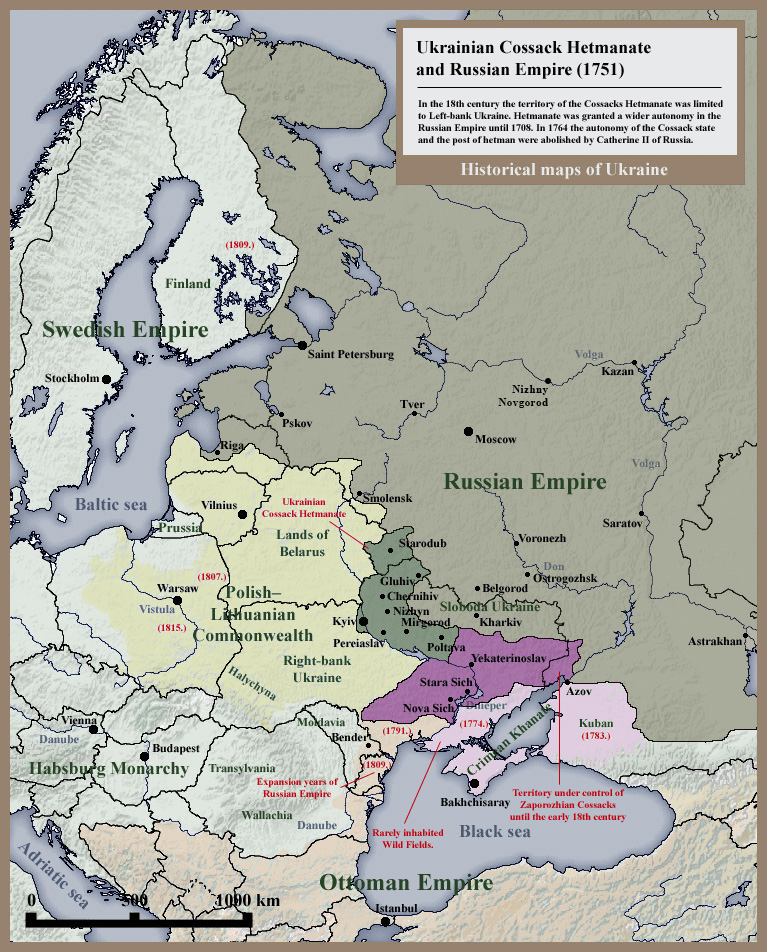
Historical map of Ukrainian Cossack Hetmanate and territory of Zaporozhian Cossacks under rule of Russian Empire (1751).

In the Russian Empire, the Cossacks constituted 12 separate Cossack voiskos, settled along the frontiers: the Don Cossacks, Kuban Cossacks, Terek Cossacks, Buh Cossacks, Astrakhan Cossacks, Ural Cossacks, Orenburg Cossacks, Siberian Cossacks, Semiryechensk Cossacks, Baikal Cossacks, Amur Cossacks, and Ussuri Cossacks. Also, there was a small number of the Cossacks in Krasnoyarsk and Irkutsk, who would form the Yenisey Cossack Host and Irkutsk Cossack regiment of the Ministry of the Interior in 1917. The stanitsa, or village formed the primary unit of this organization. Each stanitsa held its land as a commune, and might allow non-Cossacks (excepting Jews) to settle on this land for payment of a certain rent. The assembly of all householders in villages of less than 30 households, and of 30 elected men in villages having from 30 to 300 households (one from each 10 households in the more populous ones), constituted the village assembly. This assembly resembled the mir, but had wider attributes: it assessed the taxes, divided the land, took measures for the opening and support of schools, village grain-stores, communal cultivation, and so on, and elected its ataman (leader) and its judges, who settled all disputes up to an amount that the 1911 Encyclopædia Britannica gives as "£10" (or above that sum with the consent of both sides).

All Cossack males had to perform military service for 20 years, beginning at the age of 18. They spent their first three years in the preliminary division, the next 12 in active service, and the last five years in the reserve. Every Cossack had to procure his own uniform, equipment and horse (if mounted), the government supplying only the arms.

Cossacks on active service were divided into three equal parts according to age, and only the first third (approximately age 18–26) normally performed active service, while the rest effectively functioned as reserves, based at home but bound to march out at short notice. The officers came from the military schools, in which all Cossack voiskos had their own vacancies, or were non-commissioned Cossack officers, with officers' grades. In return for this service the Cossacks received from the state considerable grants of land for each voisko separately.

In 1893, the Cossacks had a total population of 2,648,049 (including 1,331,470 women), and they owned nearly 146,500,000 acres (593,000 km^{2}) of land, including 105,000,000 acres (425,000 km^{2}) of arable land and 9,400,000 acres (38,000 km^{2}) under forests. Each stanitsa controlled a share of the land, divided up at the rate of 81 acres (328,000 m^{2}) per each soul, with special grants to officers (personal to some of them, in lieu of pensions), and leaving about one-third of the land as a reserve for the future. The income which the Cossack voiskos received from the lands (which they rented to different persons), also from various sources (trade patents, rents of shops, fisheries, permits for gold-digging, etc.), as also from the subsidies they received from the government (about £712,500 in 1893), went to cover all the expenses of state and local administration. They had, besides, a special reserve capital of about £2,600,000. Village taxes covered the expenditure of the village administration. Each voisko had a separate general administration, and administrative structures differed within the different voiskos. The central administration, at the Ministry of War, comprising representatives of each voisko, discussed the proposals of all new laws affecting the Cossacks.

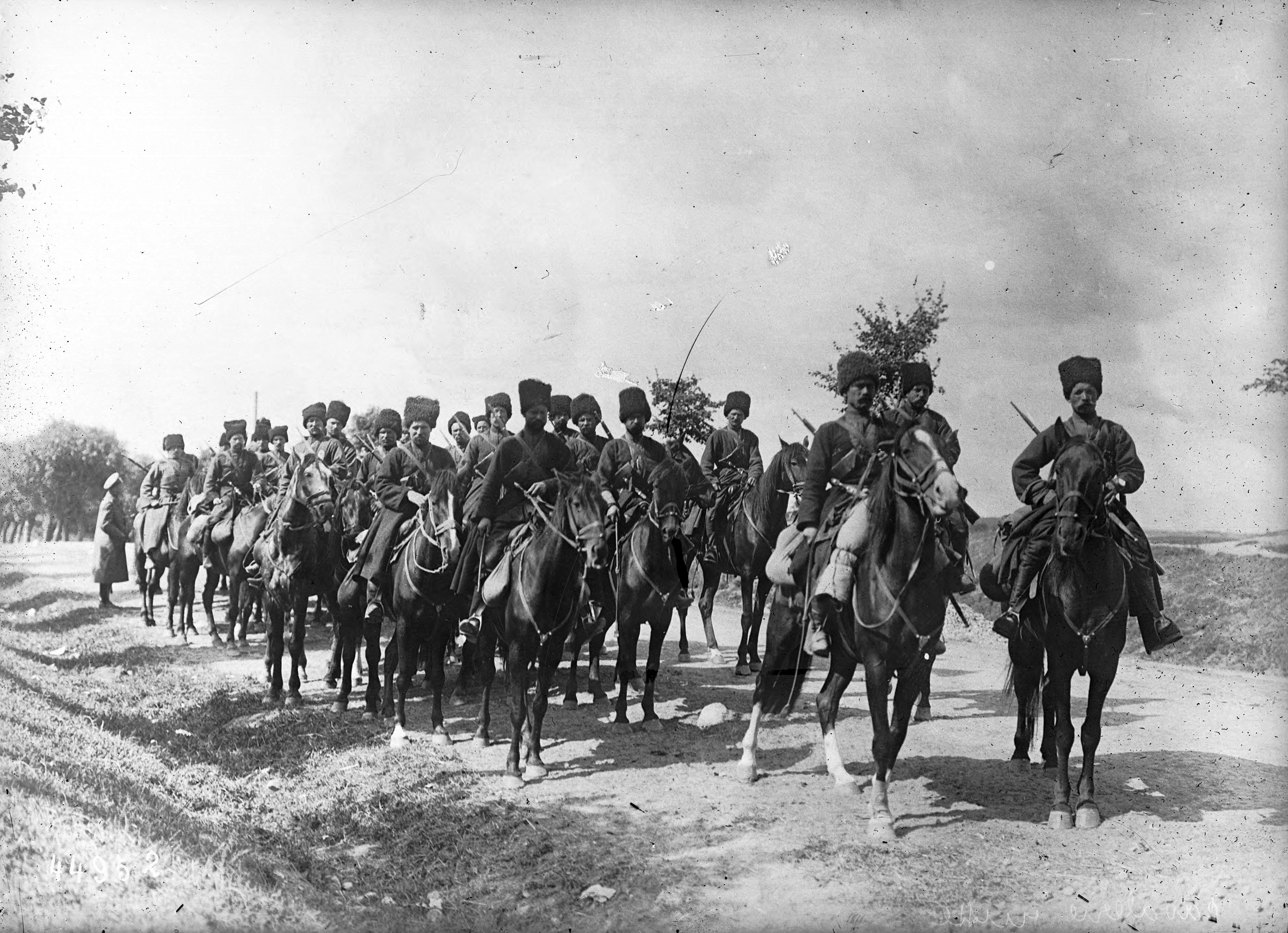
Russian cossacks on the front. 1915

In time of war, the ten Cossack voiskos had to supply 890 mounted sotnias or squadrons (of 125 men each), 108 infantry sotnias or companies (also 125 men each), and 236 guns, representing 4267 officers and 177,100 men, with 170,695 horses. In time of peace they kept 314 squadrons, 54 infantry sotnias, and 20 batteries containing 108 guns (2574 officers, 60,532 men, 50,054 horses). Altogether, on the eve of World War I the Cossacks had 328,705 men ready to take up arms.

As a rule, popular education amongst the Cossacks stood at a higher level than in the remainder of Imperial Russia. They had more schools and a greater proportion of their children went to school. In addition to agriculture, which (with the exception of the Ussuri Cossacks) sufficed to supply their needs and usually to leave a certain surplus, they carried on extensive cattle and horse breeding, vine culture in the Caucasus, fishing on the Don, the Ural, and the Caspian Sea, hunting, beekeeping etc. The Cossacks mostly rented out rights to extract coal, gold and other minerals found on their territories to strangers, who also owned most factories.

The Tsarist authorities also introduced a military organization similar to that of the Cossacks into certain non-Cossack districts, which supplied a number of mounted infantry sotnias ("hundreds"). Their peace-footing on the eve of World War I comprised:

- Daghestan, six regular squadrons and three of militia.
- Kuban Circassians, one sotnia.
- Terek, eight sotnias.
- Kars, three sotnias.
- Batum, two infantry and one mounted sotnia.
- Turkomans, three sotnias.

In total, 25 squadrons and 2 companies...

== Russian Revolution ==
In the Civil War that followed the Russian Revolution, the Cossacks found themselves on both sides of the conflict. Many officers and experienced Cossacks fought for the White Army, and some of the poorer ones joined the Red Army. Following the defeat of the White Army, a policy of Decossackization (Raskazachivaniye) took place on the surviving Cossacks and their homelands since they were viewed as a potential threat to the new regime. This involved dividing their territory amongst other divisions and giving it to new autonomous republics of minorities, and then actively encouraging settlement of these territories with those peoples, but there were also arrests and violent repressions. This policy of resettlement was especially true for the Terek Cossacks land. The Cossack homelands were often very fertile, and during the collectivisation campaign many Cossacks shared the fate of kulaks. The famine of 1933 hit the Don and Kuban territory the hardest. According to Michael Kort, "During 1919 and 1920, out of a population of approximately 3 million, the Bolshevik regime killed or deported an estimated 300,000 to 500,000 Cossacks", including 45,000 Terek Cossacks.

== World War II ==
When the war broke out the Cossacks found themselves on both sides of the conflict. Most fought for the Soviet Union; however, some chose to settle old scores by collaborating with the Germans, especially after the Soviet Union's initial series of defeats. These Cossack collaborators included Ivan Kononov, a Soviet major who defected to the Germans in August 1941 and served around the German-occupied city of Mogilev, guarding lines of communications against Soviet partisans, and later in Yugoslavia.

In the summer of 1942, the German armies entered territories inhabited by the Cossacks. There in the open steppe resistance was futile, but nevertheless many, despite their hatred of Communism, refused to collaborate with the invaders of their country. While collaboration was inevitable, most of the leaders were former Tsarist officers who wanted to avenge their defeat by the Communists, but many recruits came from prisoner-of-war camps. On some occasions relatives separated by the Russian Civil War met each other again on different sides of the conflict and killed ruthlessly.

During the Battle of Stalingrad, Cossacks attacks, some led by Semyon Budyonny, were able to keep the Germans from conquering the Caucausus, where particularly the Terek and the Kuban Cossacks were able to prevent the Germans from taking the mountains. Not only was the region rich in oil, but it was also the key to Iran and Iraq.

From 1943 onward, the Cossacks were kept mostly in the southern part of the front, where their use in reconnaissance and logistics proved invaluable. Many went on through Romania and into the Balkans during the final stages of the war.

Most of the collaborators with Nazi Germany of around 70,000 personnel were the Don Cossacks, who, formerly the largest and strongest host, suffered the worst under Soviet collectivization policies. Kuban and Terek Cossacks, on the other hand, fought almost exclusively for the Red Army, and even in most desperate situations their heroism was evident. Being the largest Red Army Cossack host, the Kuban Cossacks in 1945 triumphantly marched on Red Square in the famous Victory Parade.

The collaborationist units, the Kazachi Stan mobile encampment and the XV SS Cossack Cavalry Corps, surrendered to the British forces in 1945 in Austria. Under Soviet-Allied Yalta Agreements about 45,000 of them were forcibly repatriated to the USSR, ultimately delivering the Cossack leadership to execution and the rank-and-file to the Gulag system and internal exile. Following the death of Joseph Stalin, they were amnestied and allowed to return to their native lands.

The division of the Cossacks in both the Russian Civil War and the Second World War continues to be a controversial issue to this day.

== Present ==
=== Russia ===
Since the collapse of the Soviet Union in Russia emerged numerous cossack communities all over the country. In Russia, both registered and unregistered communities identify with cossackism. The Cossack communities in Russia cooperate with each other as well as with the Russian Orthodox Church. End of 2018 the Cossacks have set up an All-Russian Cossack Community to coordinate cultural work and strengthen the Cossack roots (such as to introduce the original Cossack costumes again). During the 2018 FIFA World Cup, Cossack groups were incorporated into Russian police forces in order to suppress anti-Putin protests.

=== Ukraine ===
In 21st-century Ukraine, there are hundreds of diverse associations of Cossacks.

The organization "The Ukrainian Registered Cossacks" (URC) was established on March 29, 2002, by the decision of the Grand Rada of All-Ukrainian public organization "Ukrainian Registered Cossacks" (URC) and was registered in the Ministry of Justice on 8 July 2002.

Hetman of URK

- Anatoliy Shevchenko March 29, 2002 - present

== See also ==
- Cossack motorcycles
- Hetman
- Hetmans of Ukrainians Cossacks
- Kosiński Uprising
- Rezā Shāh

== External articles ==
- Ukrainian Cossacks
- Cossacks (Encyclopedia of Ukraine)
