= Reunion and Concord (monument) =

- Russian: Памятник Примирения и Согласия
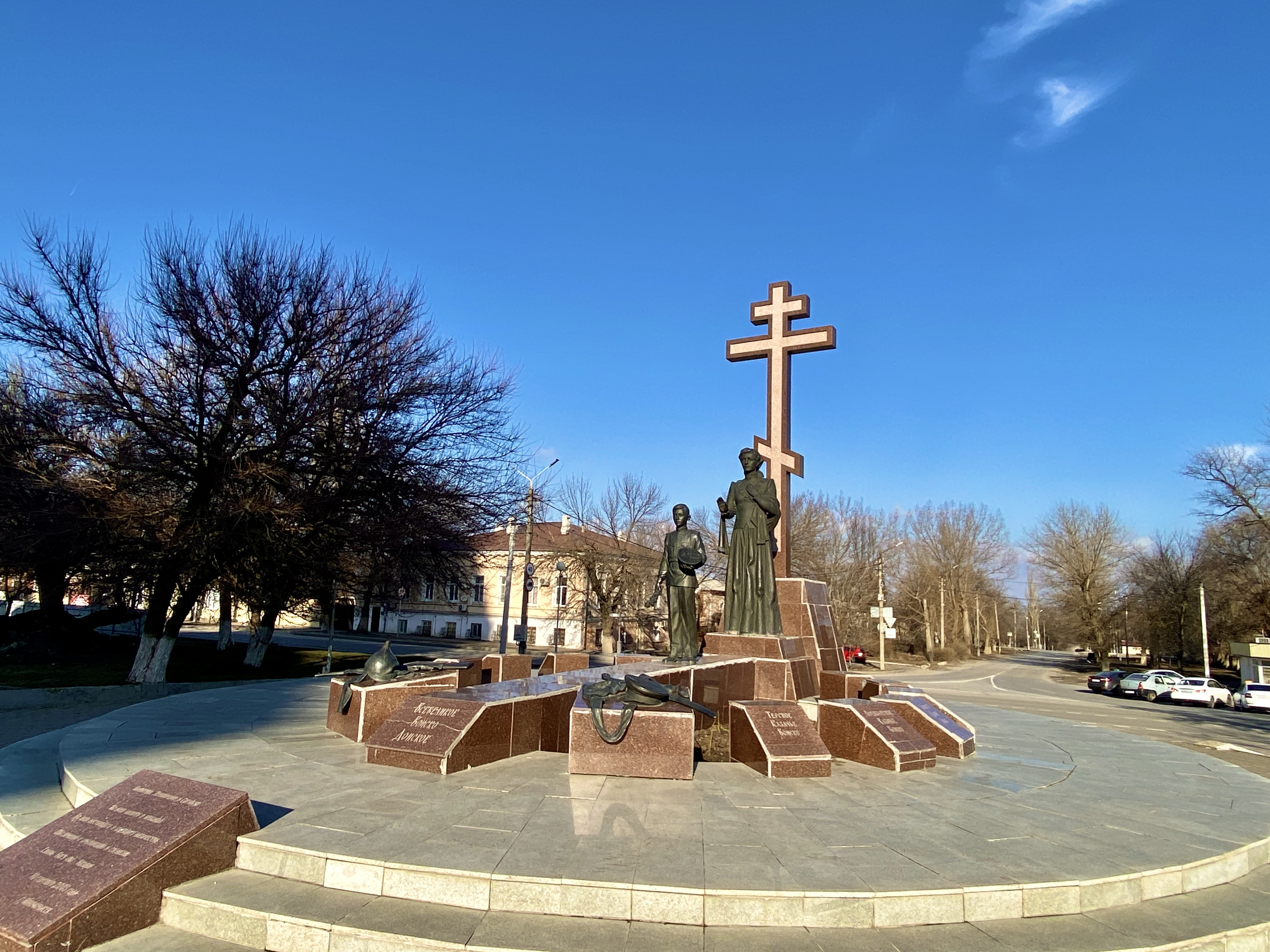
- Interactive map of Reunion and Concord
- Location: Yermaka square in Novocherkassk, Rostov oblast, Russia
- Coordinates: 47°24′51″N 40°06′40″E
- Designer: Anatoly Sknarin
- Type: Monument
- Material: Bronze, granite
- Opening date: 2005

Reunion and Concord (Russian: Примирение и согласие, romanized: Primirenije i soglasije) is a bronze monument, which symbolizes unity of the Cossacks and their reunited with each other irrespective of political opinions and beliefs. It located on Yermaka square in Novocherkassk, Rostov oblast, Russia. The monument was designed by sculptor Anatoly Sknarin and architect I. Zhukov. The opening ceremony of the monument took place on Yermaka square in 2005 and was held in conjunction by the 200-year anniversary of Novocherkassk.

== Description ==
A large granitical Orthodox cross is a main element of the composition. The monument is 7 m height. Twenty stones are erected around the cross. Names of the Cossack armies are written on the stones: the Don, Kuban, Terek, Astrakhan, Ural, Orenburg, Siberian, Semiryeche, Transbaikal, Amur, and Ussuri. A bronze cossaсk peaked cap, a bashlyk and a shashka are positioned to the right of the Cross. A rifle and a budenovka are positioned on the other side. All these items are attributes of warring the Red Guard and the Don Army during the Russian Civil War. A bronze statue of Cossack woman stands in front of the Cross and looks at the boy, who stands ahead of her. The boy holds peaked cap. In front of the sculpture composition there is a marble slab with carved words:

We came to an agreement and concord in order to memory of the past, in order to the present and the future of the Cossacks. Thank goodness we are the Cossacks.

Civil War in the Don region had been characterized by the duration and the magnitude. The segment of the local population embraced the Soviet rule. Other part resisted them so bitterly. War crimes of murder and robbery were perpetrated by both parties. The idea of building the monument was proposed by ataman of Russian and foreign Cossacks V. Volodatskiy and the headship of the Imperial Family of Russia Maria Vladimirovna.
