= Terek Cossacks =

Cossack host

Regions with significant populations
- Russia: Stavropol Krai; North Ossetia–Alania; Dagestan; Chechnya; Ingushetia: 255,000 (1916)

Languages
- Russian

Religion
- Predominantly Russian Orthodox; Minority Starovers

Related ethnic groups
- Russians, Ukrainians, Ossetians, Dagestanis, Chechens and Ingush people

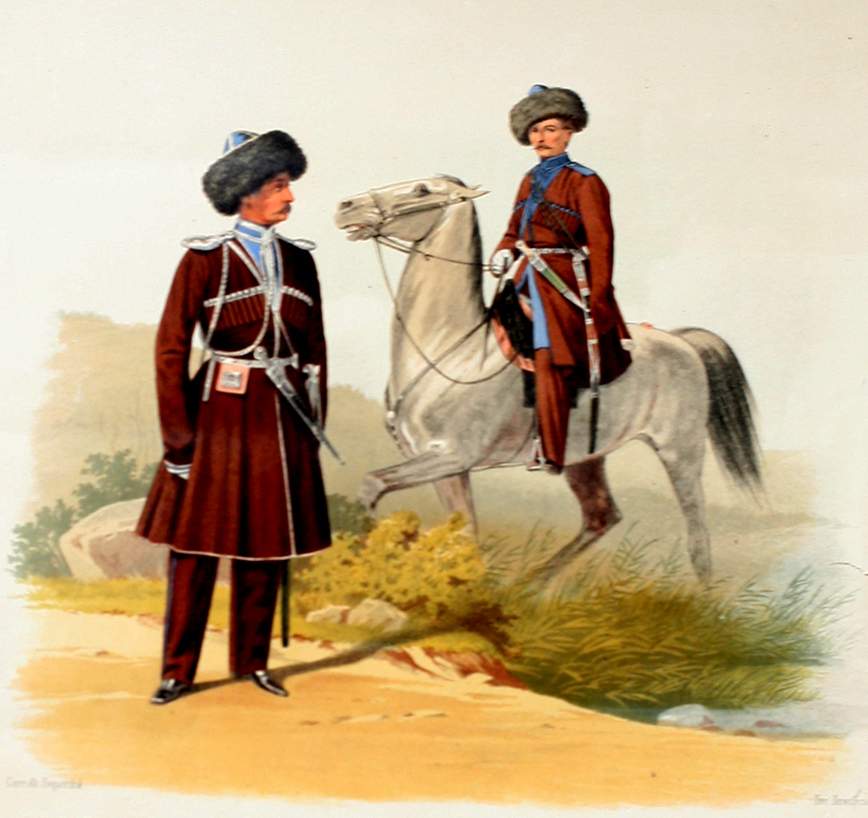

The Terek Cossack Host (Note: Russian: Терское казачье войско, romanized: Térskoye kazáchye vóysko, pronounced [ˈtʲerskəjɪ kɐˈzat͡ɕʲjɪˈ vojskə]) was a Cossack host created in 1577 from free Cossacks who resettled from the Volga to the Terek River. The local aboriginal Terek Cossacks joined this Cossack host later. In 1792 it was included in the Caucasus Line Cossack Host and separated from it again in 1860, with the capital of Vladikavkaz. In 1916 the population of the Host was 255,000 within an area of 1.9 million desyatinas.

The host would be destroyed during De-Cossackization between 1919 and 1933, however, in the 1990s Russian speakers living in territories formerly controlled by the host have attempted to revive Cossack traditions and culture but were largely expelled from the Chechen Republic of Ichkeria, their main power base, due to the First Chechen War. A "Terek Cossack Host" was formed in Stavropol on February 12, 1997, however, has no connection to the original host, and is instead a "Registered Cossack" paramilitary.

== History ==
=== Early history ===
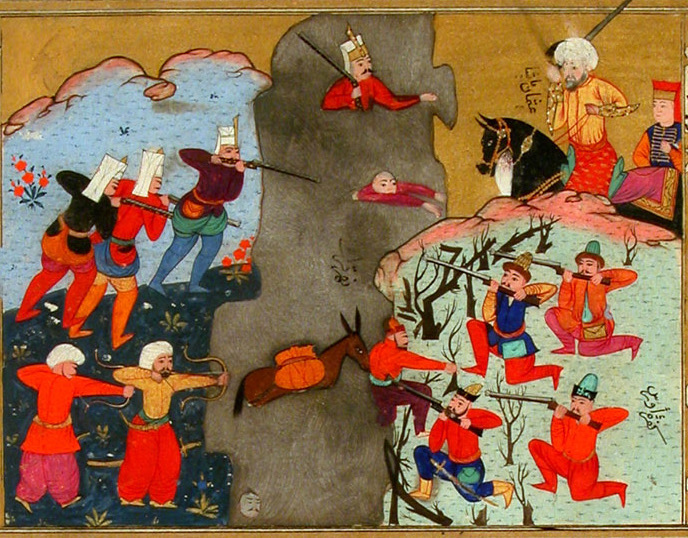
Cossacks (right) attack the Ottoman army at the crossing of the Terek in the Battle of Sunzha River, during the Ottoman–Safavid War (1578–1590). Secaatname (1586)

It is unclear how the first Cossack community appeared on the Terek. One theory is that they were descendants of the Khazar state and of the Tmutarakan Principality, as there are records indicating that Mstislav of Tmutarakan in the Battle of Listveno in 1023 had Cossacks on his side when he destroyed the army of Yaroslav the Wise. This would mean the Slavic peoples of the Caucasus are native to the region having settled there much earlier.) But later Terek Cossacks assimilated the first Terek Cossacks and introduced their own new agriculture.

The earliest known records of Slavic settlements on the lower Terek River date to 1520 when the Ryazan Principality was annexed by the Grand Duchy of Moscow and a lone group left and settled in the natural haven of the Terek River (modern northern Chechnya). The early settlement was located at the mouth of the Aktash River. This formed the oldest Cossack group, the Greben Cossacks (Гребенские казаки Grebenskiye Kazaki) who settled on both banks of the river.

In 1559–71 the Tsardom of Russia, in the course of several campaigns, built several fortifications, during which the first Terka was built, later taken over by the still independent Cossacks. In 1577, after the Volga Cossacks were defeated by the stolnik Ivan Murashkin, many scattered, some of whom settled in the Terek basin and voevoda Novosiltsev built the second Terka on the Terek, marking the start of the Terek Cossacks. In 1584 this Terka was again taken over by Cossacks, some of whom were recruited by the Georgian king Simon I of Kartli.

In a separate story, an ataman of the Don Cossack Host named Andrei Shadrin led a band of three Cossack sotnias to the Kumyk lands, founding a frontier town called 'Tersky' (location uncertain). This may have been partially motivated by his tense relations with Yermak Timofeyevich. He subsequently founded Andreyevo (the modern Endirey), which was said to be named for him.

In the late 16th century several campaigns by the Terek Cossacks were carried out against the Ottoman Empire (Temryuk) which led the Sultan to complain to Ivan the Terrible. In 1589 the first outpost on the Sunzha was built and a permanent Terka, later known as Tersky Gorodok, was built on the lower Terek.

=== 18th century ===
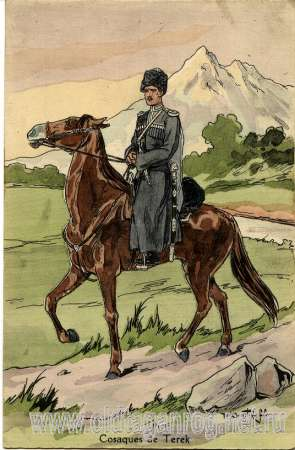
Terek Cossacks uniform of 1st Volgsky Regiment

In 1711 Graf Apraskin re-settled all of the Rowing Cossacks on the left bank of the Terek River, this move was met with resentment, and during the entire 18th century the Terek Cossacks would still inhabit the left bank and use the rich vineyards and lands right up until 1799. Also in 1720 the Rowers and Tereks were fully incorporated into the Russian Empire and during the Russo-Persian War (1722–1723), the Cossacks aided Peter I of Russia in his conquest of the eastern Dagestan and the capture of Derbent. During the campaign the 1000 re-settled Don Cossacks on the Agrakhan and the Sulak formed the Agrakhan Cossack Host (Аграханское Казачье Войско), which was united with the Terek Cossacks. In 1735 by a new agreement with Persia the Sulak line was abandoned, and Agrakhan Cossacks were re-settled on the lower Terek Delta, and the fort of Kizlyar was founded.

Thus in 1735 three hosts were formed: Grebenskoye (Гребенское Rowing) from the descendants of the earliest Cossacks, Tersko-Semeynoye (Терско-Семейное Terek-Family) from the re-settled Agrakhan Cossacks up to Kizlyar, and Tersko-Kizlyarskoye (Терско-Кизлярское Terek-Kizlyar) from the Agrakhan Cossacks as well as Armenians and Georgians. When the Kalmyks arrived in the northwestern Caspian a combined campaign was waged against Temryuk during the Russo-Turkish War (1735–1739), where the Terek Cossacks were led by Atamans Auka and Petrov.

In 1736 and again in 1765 the right bank of the Terek, still nominally Cossack property, was offered to Chechens who wanted to adopt Russian patronage and re-settle there (noting that historically, the lands immediately north of the Terek river were indeed Chechen before the Mongol invasion and even to a degree after it, and the Chechen highlands were dependent on their agricultural production). By the latter half of the 18th century, relations between the Cossacks and the mountain people began to sour. In 1765 the outpost of Mozdok was founded, which became an immediate target for Kabardins who attacked the Terek line and Kizlyar. In 1771 Yemelyan Pugachev arrived in Terek, and, to show loyalty, Ataman Tatarintsev arrested him. Pugachev fled and the Pugachev Rebellion in 1772–1774 gained no support on the Terek.

=== Caucasus War (1770s–1860s) ===
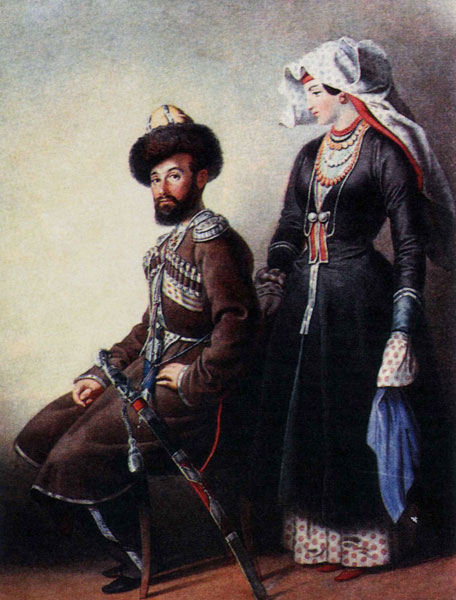
Terek Cossack couple in the 19th century, painting by a Prince Gagarin

The Russo-Turkish War (1768–1774) and the resulting Treaty of Küçük Kaynarca gave Russia the pretext under which they could begin their expansion into the Caucasus, marking the start of the century-long Caucasus War. In 1769–1770 almost half of the Volga Cossacks were re-settled around Mozdok. In 1776 further settlers arrived including more of the Volga Cossacks (the remaining Cossacks on the lower Volga were separated into the Astrakhan Cossacks Host) and the Khopyor Cossacks from the eastern Don territory. These formed the Azov-Mozdok defence line. Major foreposts for Russian expansion into the central Caucasus were founded by the re-settlers including: Georgiyevsk in 1777 by the Khopyor regiment, and Vladikavkaz in 1784.

During this early phase several high-profile battles took place. In June 1774 Devlet-Girey sent a massive Kabardin Army against the Terek Cossacks, on 10-11 of June the stanitsa of Naurskaya was heroically defended against the invaders and in 1785 Kizlyar was defended against Sheikh Mansur. In 1788–91 the Terek Cossacks took part in three campaigns which took them to the Circassian port of Anapa in western Caucasus. The major gap in the western section of the line of defense was solved in 1792 when the Black Sea Cossacks were re-settled there.

The next three decades brought severe difficulties for the Russian effort in the Caucasus. After the joining of Georgia to Russia in 1801 and the subsequent Russo-Persian War (1804–1813), the Terek Cossacks spared some men and took part in combat under Yerevan, but on the whole most of them were in constant defence of their home lines. All this changed when in 1816 General Yermolov took command of the Caucasus army. Having by now secured major strategic footholds in most of the North Caucasus and Georgia following the last war fought with Persia and the resulting Treaty of Gulistan, he found himself able to make major adjustments. In 1818 he changed the Russian tactics from defensive to offensive and began building the Sunzha-Vladikavkaz line where strongholds such as Groznaya and Vnezapnaya were founded. Yermolov further reformed the whole structure of the Cossacks and in 1819 replaced elected Atamans with appointed commanders.

In Transcaucasia, Cossacks took part in the Russo-Turkish War (1828–1829) where they participated in the Siege of Kars and other key battles. After Yermolov was recalled from the Caucasus, a new reform took place and the interim regiments in the central Caucasus were united with the three Hosts on the Terek to form the Caucasus Line Cossack Host (Кавказское линейное казачье войско, Kavkazskoye lineynoye kazachye voysko) in 1832.

By this point the Russian control in the Caucasus had improved. Most of the battles took place in Chechen and Dagestani territories far away from Cossack homes. During the 1840s several successful expeditions were mounted deep into the mountains. The Line Cossacks participated in the Crimean War (1853–1856) and finally in the closing phase of the Russian advance against Shamil in 1859.

=== Terek Cossack Host 1860–1920s ===
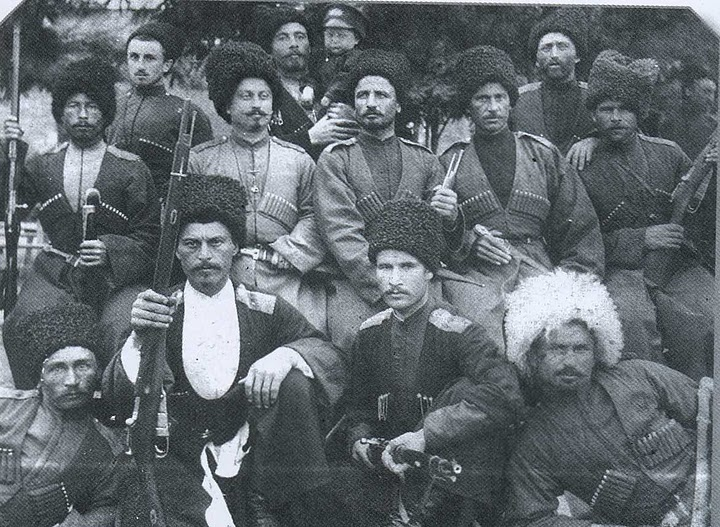
Cossacks of the 2nd Mountain-Mozdok Regiment of the Terek Cossack Army

The end of the Caucasus War marked the end of the Line Cossack Host. In 1860 it was divided, with the two western regiments joining the Black Sea Cossacks to form the Kuban Cossack Host and the remaining into the Terek Cossack Host. The next decade showed a gradual reform from military to civil control. In 1865 a permanent police force was formed, and in 1869 the Terek Oblast was formed, consisting of eight mountainous districts (populated by indigenous people) and seven Cossack subdivisions. Several regimental reforms followed: Kizlyar and Rower as well as Mountain and Mozdok regiments were united into two (reducing the number of sub-divisions to five), and in 1871 a charter for Terek Cossacks was published.

From the 1870s onwards the Eastern Caucasus remained largely peaceful (if one discounts uprisings waged by the Chechens in the late 1870s and the occasional exchange of raids). However the Terek Cossacks took part in several Imperial Wars, including campaigns against Khiva in 1873. During the Russo-Turkish War (1877–1878) the Terek Cossacks sent six cavalry regiments, one Guards squadron and one mounted artillery regiment to the Balkans and a further seven regiments and mounted battery were mobilized against the rebelling Chechens and Dagestanis, who initiated an uprising against Tsarist authorities in 1878.

In the 1880s the arrival of the railways and the discovery of oil made the Terek Oblast one of the wealthiest in the Caucasus, resulting in a large growth in Cossack and indigenous mountain populations. This created friction on land ownership. The Cossacks held extensive fertile areas in the lowlands and steppes, whilst the indigenous mountain populations only held land in the mountainous zones. Peace was preserved, by a complex Russian policy of supporting loyal clan leaders and free supplies of food and goods The Terek Cossacks took part in campaigns against Geok-Tepe in 1879 and in 1885 up to the Afghan border in Central Asia.

==== Uniform and equipment ====
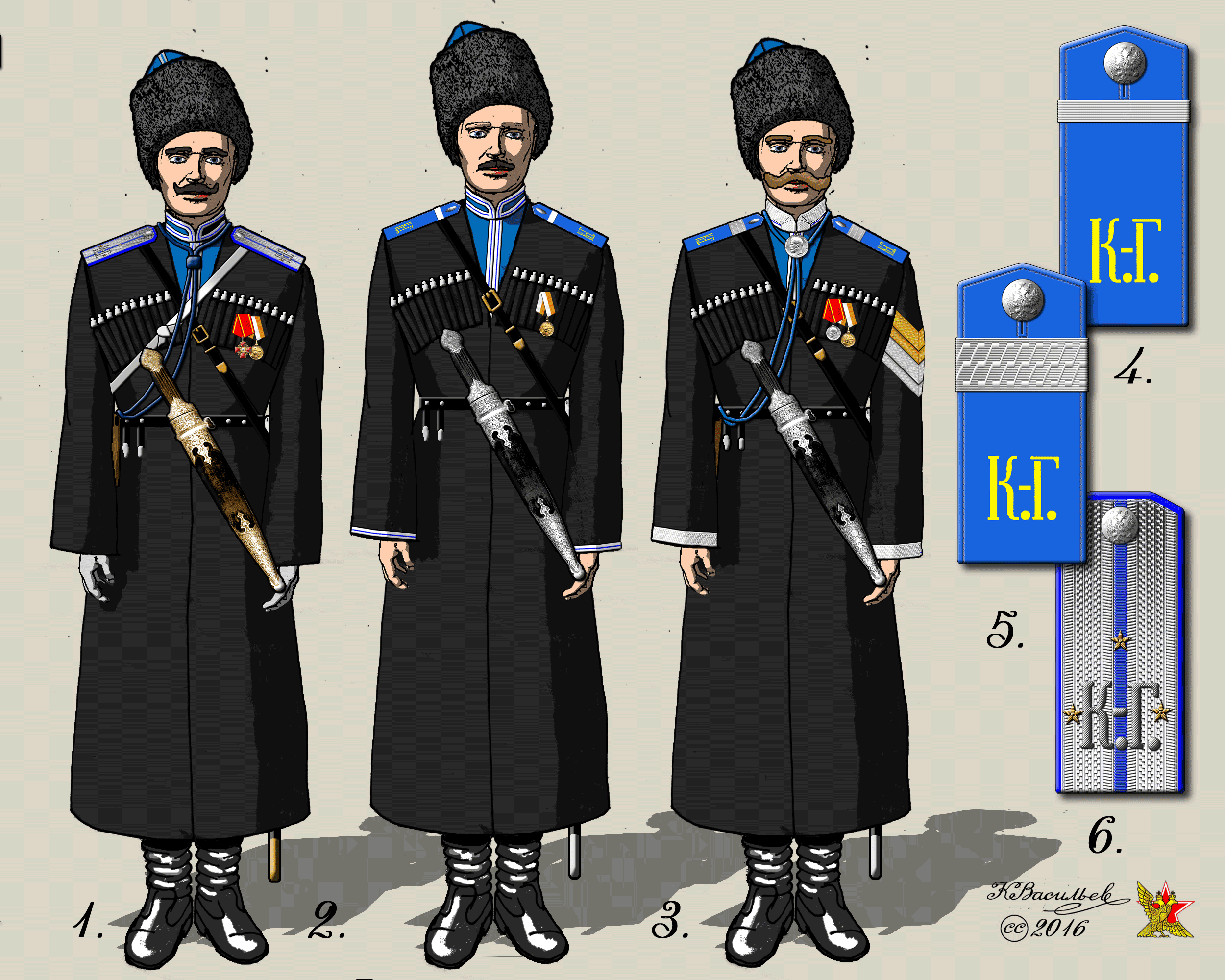
Uniform of Russian Kizlyar-Grebensky 1st Cossack horse regiment

Until 1914 the Terek Cossack Host wore a full dress uniform comprising a dark grey/black kaftan (knee length collarless coat) with light blue shoulder straps and braid on the wide cuffs. Ornamental containers (czerkeska) which had originally contained single loading measures of gunpowder for muzzle-loading muskets, were worn on the breasts of the kaftans. The kaftan had an open front, showing a light blue waistcoat. Wide grey trousers were worn, tucked into soft leather boots without heels. Officers wore silver epaulettes, braiding and ferrules, the latter in their czerkeskas. This Caucasian national dress was also worn by the Kuban Cossack Host but with different waistcoat and facing colours (red). Tall black fur hats were worn on all occasions with light blue cloth tops and (for officers) silver lace. A whip was used instead of spurs. Prior to 1908, individual cossacks from all Hosts were required to provide their own uniforms (together with horses, Caucasian saddles and harness). On active service during World War I the Terek Cossacks retained their distinctive dress but with a dark waistcoat replacing the conspicuous light blue one and without the silver ornaments or blue facings of full dress. A black felt cloak (bourki) was worn in bad weather both in peace-time and on active service.

The Terk and Kuban Cossacks of the Imperial Escort (Konvoi) wore a special gala uniform; including a scarlet kaftan edged with gold braid and a white waistcoat.

=== Soviet period ===
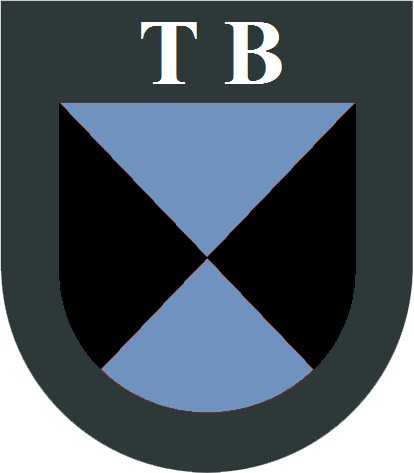
Patch of Terek collaborators in the German XV SS Cossack Cavalry Corps.

The arrival of the February and later the October Revolution caught most Terek Cossack units on the front lines in Kurdistan. The Chechen and Ingush mountain peoples, located along the Sunzha line, took full advantage of the crises, wiping out several Cossack stanitsas (district posts).

In 1918, according to Peter Kenez, "The Bolsheviks were more successful in the nearby Terek. In November the Twelfth Red army defeated the Cossacks who fought independently of the Volunteer army." However, by January 1919, the defeat of the Eleventh Red Army forced the Twelfth to retreat from Terek towards Astrakhan. Yet, according to Kenez, "The Chechen and the Ingush were never subdued and their raids and risings made the Northern Caucasus a festering sore for the Volunteer Army."

In 1920 many Terek Cossacks were deported to Ukraine and the northern part of European Russia, however soon after the deportation was reverted and in 1921 Mountain ASSR was formed. This left the former Sunzha-Terek Mesopotamia triangle split by the returned Chechen land stretching through the middle. The remaining portions were formed by the Sunzha Cossack Okrug which also encompassed lands around Grozny. However, the Sunzha's importance to the Vainakh peoples as their historical territorial heart ensured that the early communists, mindful of the claims of indigenous peoples, would return it in order to turn them from the Mensheviks toward the Bolsheviks (to balance out the anti-Bolshevik Cossacks). A deadlock formed in the Northern Caucasus. On one hand, the Cossacks were very adverse to Bolshevism, and the latter responded with a Decossackization policy. On the other hand, many mountainous peoples were hostile to any Russian rule, Red or White (most originally looked to the Reds as a force also fighting against their foes, the Cossacks, but after the Reds began adopting similar policies as their Tzarist predecessors, resentment resurfaced), and continued fighting Russian/Cossack populations. In the end, the Red Army had to use Cossack tactics and hire local levies to police the region. The idea of sandwiching a Cossack district within a Chechen autonomy was seen as a solution.

In the 1930s, to make the mountainous autonomies more sustainable in economical terms, they were united with the remaining Cossack holdings: the Sunzha district was retaken by the Chechen-Ingush ASSR, the former capital of the Terek Oblast, Vladikavkaz became the administrative centre for North Ossetia, likewise the Kabardino-Balkar Autonomous Oblast was also awarded to Cossack territories. On the lower Terek, between 1923 and 1937, the Dagestan ASSR administered the extensive territory there (Kizlyar, Terek Delta). Thus by the start of the Second World War only the historical Terek Left-bank was not administered by autonomies. However, on the other hand, all these lands (northern Chechnya, Kizlyar, Little Kabarda, historical North Ossetia, East Prigorodny/Western Ingushetia, etc.) had historically been inhabited by Caucasian peoples before the end of the Caucasian Wars.

Thus by the start of the Second World War only the historical Terek Left-bank was not administered by autonomies, however, most of the administration and urban population of those regions was dominated by ethnic Russians. This was paralleled with the gradual down-folding of anti-Cossack repressions and their eventual rehabilitation by the mid-1930s, including forming numerous units in the Red Army.

Cossacks fought on both sides of the Second World War. Many Cossack prisoners of war joined Nazi Germany who promised to free their lands from Bolshevism. Terek Cossacks made up the Vth regiment of the 2nd Brigade of the 1st Cossack Division. Soon the war came to Cossack lands themselves, in 1942 the Nazi offensive Case Blue, and by autumn, the western regions of the former Terek Cossack Hosts were occupied. By November, the Battle of the Caucasus reached North Ossetia, and Germans were already making plans to lease the oilfields in Grozny. Most of the Cossack population took part in repelling the invader.

During the 1920s and 30s, despite efforts of Soviet Union to pacify the mountainous peoples via different programmes, such as Korenizatsiya, there was still low-level secession movements in the highlands. Nazi Germany decided to use this friction in creating a fifth column out of them. In the central Caucasus, these were the Karachay and Balkars who carried out low-level insurgency. Further east, these were the Vainakhs and an existing insurgency by a Khasan Israilov was fuelled by supplies via Nazi paradrops. By autumn 1942, the insurgency diverted significant Red Army resources, including aviation.

However, after the Battle of Stalingrad the Germans began a mass evacuation from the Caucasus. The price that mountainous people paid was dear, in late 1943 as part of Soviet Collective punishment, Operation Lentil began, which saw a total deportation of all Chechens, Ingush, Karachay and Balkar people to Kazakhstan. In the aftermath, most of the land was portioned, between loyal mountainous peoples such as Kabardins, Ossetians and Dagestanis, and Russians and Cossacks. For example, a vast Grozny Oblast was created encompassing almost all of the historic lower-Terek Cossack lands, whilst North Ossetia took the Sunzha and Kabardin ASSR had central line Cossack stanitsas.

This status quo continued until the second half of the 1950s, when there was once again a cool-down in Soviet government towards Cossacks after the death of Joseph Stalin. In 1957, all of the deported mountainous people were rehabilitated, and their republics restored. However this was not done in previous borders, for example, the historic homeland of lower Terek, Naursky and Schyolkovsky districts were incorporated into the Chechen-Ingush ASSR, whilst the Kizlyar district was passed onto Dagestan. Old problems of land ownership quickly resurfaced, and many returning Chechens and Ingush, forbidden to re-settle in the mountains, were settled in Cossack stanitsas.

The politics of Stagnationed USSR towards titular nations was also two-faced, on one hand all signs of nationalism were repressed, on the other hand Soviet authorities actively encouraged assignation of jobs and selection to the minorities rather than Russians. As a result, of the positive discrimination and better economic prospects in other regions of the USSR, many Russians migrated from the Northern Caucasus to other regions, such as the Tselina, Russian Far East and the Baltic Republics. Naturally, the high birth rate, of the mountainous peoples, meant that many sold their homes to them.

=== After 1990 ===
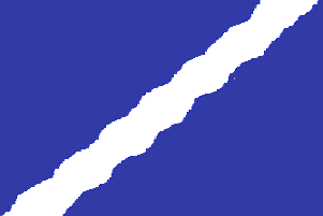
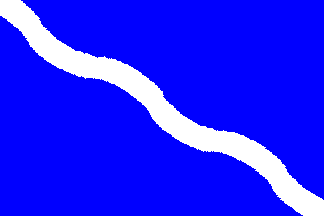
Flag of the Terek Cossack Host in Exile (left, c.1955) based in Cleveland inspired the proposed flag of a Terek Cossack Republic (right) which attempted to seceded from Chechnya and become a constituent of Russia in 1991 during the dissolution of the Soviet Union.

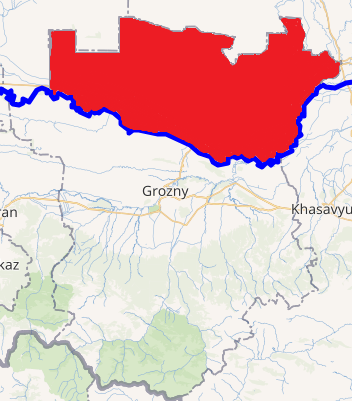
After Chechnya gained independence Russian speakers attempted to form the breakaway "Terek Cossack Republic" to rejoin Russia, claiming all territory north of the Terek river.

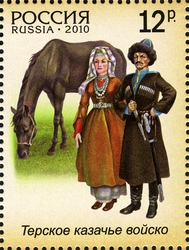
Terek cossacks on Russian postage stamp

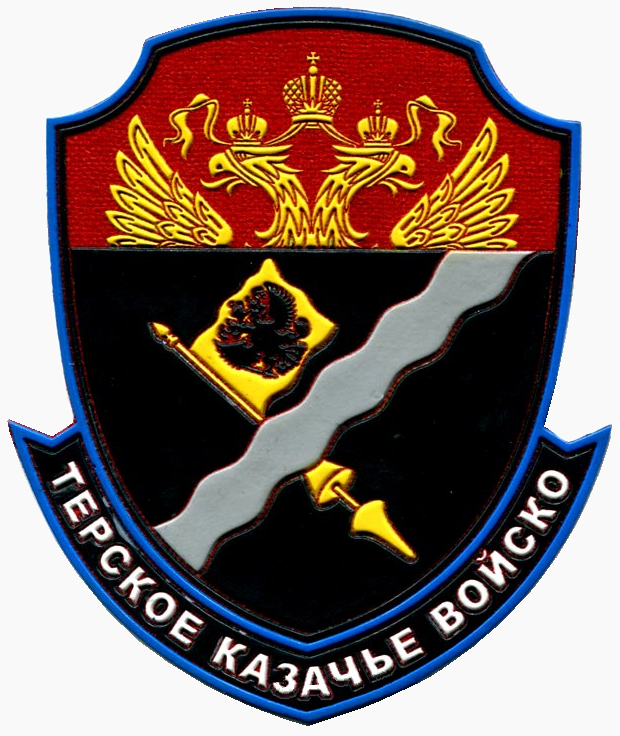
Emblem of registered Terek cossacks

Due to De-Cossackization during the Stalin era, any true Terek Cossacks would've been killed or deported, however, there remained a large Russian-speaking population in Chechnya made up of former Cossacks as well as newer Russian settlers. During glasnost and perestroika some Russian community leaders sought to revive the Cossack identity, however, any modern "Terek Cossack" is a modern invention and carries no continuity to the Terek Cossack host. Despite this, the revivalists crowned an ataman, and even formed a Cossack circle, which, on November 17, 1991, called for the secession of a "Terek Cossack Republic", consisting of all territory north of the Terek River, from the now independent Chechen Republic of Ichkeria, to rejoin Russia. At the time approximately 28% of Chechnya (280,000-300,000 people) was ethnically Russian, however, due to the revivalists fringe nature Chechen authorities where able to arrest their leaders and disrupt their rallies, preventing any serious uprising in the north.

An exodus of ethnic Russians occurred, although its causes and intensity are disputed. Some sources say that virtually the whole Russian population that left (300,000 people) before the First Chechen War, which others dispute, saying that while tens of thousands (as opposed to 300,000) left, most left due to the First Chechen War during it; Russian sources claim it was due to anti-Russian discrimination and violence, whereas others (such as Russian liberals Boris Lvin and Andrei Illarionov, and Western commentators Gall and De Waal see below) cite economic reasons and the loss of the previous disproportionate privilege held by the Russians during Soviet times, as well as the mass bombing of Grozny during the First Chechen War, where 4 out of 5 Russians in Chechnya lived. As noted by ethnic Russian economists Boris Lvin and Andrei Illiaronov, the rate and number of departures of ethnic Russians from Chechnya during 1991–94 was actually less than other areas (Kalmykia, Tuva and Yakutia).

After an attempted coup against Dudayev (who was seen as a threat to Russian oil transit) failed, Moscow responded with a military operation to reconquer Chechnya (see First Chechen War); many Terek Cossacks jumped at the opportunity to show their loyalty, and formed volunteer units that operated with the Russian Army. These were created to fight in the Sunzha and Terek stanitsas against Chechens.

During the Second Chechen War, once again Cossack units took part as an auxiliary support, and this time were allowed to establish in the Naursky raion, which still had a Russian minority; today the stanitsa of Naurskaya remains strongly associated with the Cossack movement in Chechnya.
