= Cossack host =

Territorial subdivision or military formation of Cossacks within the Russian Empire

A Cossack host, (Note: Ukrainian: Козацьке військо, romanized: Kozaćke vijśko, pronounced [kɔˈzatsʲke ˈʋijsʲkɔ]; Russian: Казачье войско, romanized: Kazačje vojsko, pronounced [kɐˈzatɕʲje ˈvojskə]) sometimes translated as Cossack army, was an administrative subdivision of Cossacks in the Russian Empire. Earlier the term voysko (host, in a sense as a doublet of guest) referred to Cossack organizations in their historical territories, most notable being the Zaporozhian Host of Zaporozhian Cossacks.

== Russian Empire ==
Each Cossack host consisted of a certain territory with Cossack settlements that had to provide military regiments for service in the Imperial Russian Army and for border patrol operations. Usually the hosts were named after the regions of their location. The stanitsa, or village, formed the primary unit of this organization.

In the Russian Empire (1721-1917), the Cossacks constituted twelve separate hosts, settled along the frontiers:

- the Don Cossack Host
- the Bug Cossacks
- the Kuban Cossack Host
- the Terek Cossack Host
- the Astrakhan Cossack Host
- the Ural Cossack Host
- the Orenburg Cossack Host
- the Siberian Cossacks
- the Semiryechye Cossack Host
- the Transbaikal Cossack Host
- the Amur Cossack Host
- the Ussuri Cossack Host

There was also a small number of the Cossacks in Krasnoyarsk and Irkutsk, who would form the Yenisey Cossack Host and the Irkutsk Cossack Regiment of the Ministry of the Interior in 1917.

Cossack hosts on Russian soil were disbanded in 1920, in the course of the Russian Civil War of 1917–1922 in a deliberate process of De-Cossackization to remove their autonomy.

== List of hosts ==
- Amur Cossack Host (1860–1918)
- Astrakhan Cossack Host (1737–1920)
- Azov Cossack Host (1832–1862)
- Baikal Cossack Host (1851-1920)
- Bashkir Host (1798-1865)
- Black Sea Cossack Host (1787–1864)
- Buh Cossack Host (1769–1817)
- Caucasus Line Cossack Host (1832–1860)
- Danube Cossack Host (1828–1868), an Imperial Russian Cossack Host formed from descendants of the Zaporozhian Cossacks
- Don Cossack Host (1570-1918, reconstituted in 1992)
- Greben Cossacks Host (1711–1745 (Note: merged into Terek Cossack Host)–1845-60 (Note: merged into, and re-emerged from, Caucasus Line Cossack Host (as part of Terek Cossack Host))–1920, reconstituted in 1992)
- Kuban Cossack Host (1860–1920, reconstituted in 1992)
- Orenburg Cossack Host (1755–1920)
- Semiryechye Cossack Host (1867–1920)
- Siberian Cossack Host (1582-1918)
- Terek Cossack Host (1577–1792 (Note: merged into Caucasus Line Cossack Host)–1860 (Note: re-emerged from Caucasus Line Cossack Host)–1920, reconstituted in 1992)
- Transbaikal Cossack Host (1851–1920)
- Ural Cossack Host (c. 14th century-end–1920)
- Ussuri Cossack Host (1889–1922, re-established in 1990 (Note: as a non-administrative unit of any sort))
- Volga Cossack Host (1734–1777)
- Zaporozhian Host (1572 (Note: as Registered Cossacks of Polish–Lithuanian Commonwealth army)/1649 (Note: as Zaporozhian Sich)–1775), of the Zaporozhian Cossacks who lived in Zaporizhia, Dnieper Ukraine, during the 16th — 18th centuries.

== See also ==
- Allotment system
- Colonia (Roman)
- Danubian Sich
- Military settlement
- Sloboda Ukraine
