= Black Sea Cossack Host =

Cossack host in southern Ukraine

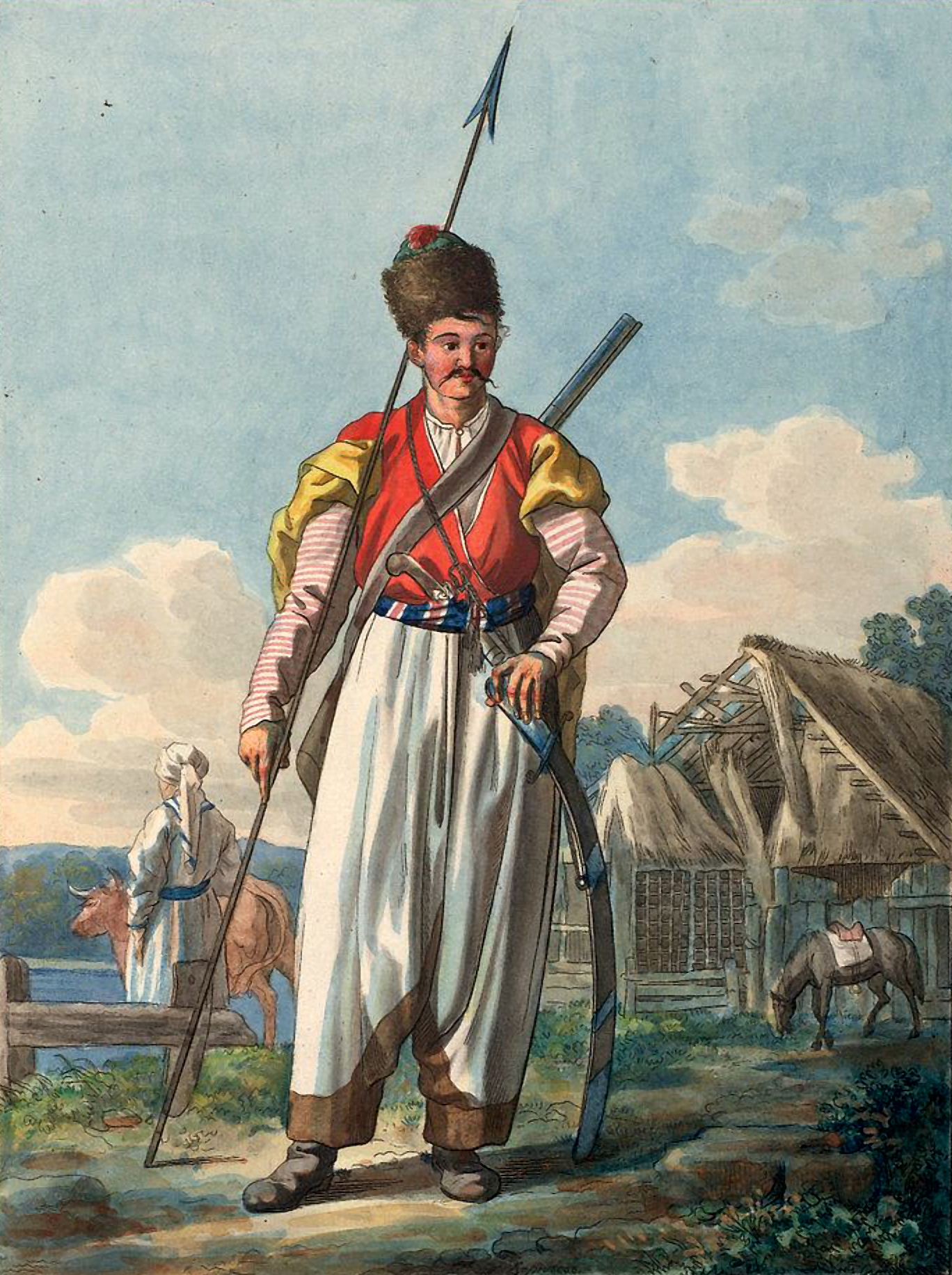
E.M. Korneev "Black Sea Cossack", 1812.

The Black Sea Cossack Host (Russian: Черномо́рское каза́чье во́йско; Ukrainian: Чорномо́рське коза́цьке ві́йсько), also known as Chernomoriya (Russian: Черномо́рия, lit. 'Black Sea region'), was a Cossack host of the Russian Empire created in 1787 in southern Ukraine from former Zaporozhian Cossacks. In the 1790s, the host was re-settled to the Kuban River. It comprised the Caucasus Fortified Defence Line from the mouth of the Kuban River to the mouth of the Bolshaya Laba River.

== History ==
The Black Sea host played a crucial role in the Russo-Turkish War of 1787–1797. As a result, Catherine II rewarded them with the Kuban land in the North Caucasus (north of the Kuban River, south of the Yeya River and east of the Sea of Azov) by her decree of June 30, 1792. At that time the area was inhabited by Nogain steppe nomads. When Russia annexed the Crimean Khanate in 1783 it inherited the Crimean claim to this land. South of the Kuban were Circassians.

Renamed the Black Sea Cossack Host in honor of the victories during the Russo-Turkish War, a total of 25,000 people made the migration in 1792–1794 from Ukraine, settling in the regions north of the Kuban River. Initially, the Black Sea Cossacks adhered to Zaporozhian traditions, such as the democratic election of the host government, but in time they adopted many Russian ways.

Instead of a central Sich, they formed a defence line from the inlet of the Kuban River into the Black Sea to the inlet of the Bolshaya Laba River, and colonised the land north of this line with stanitsas.

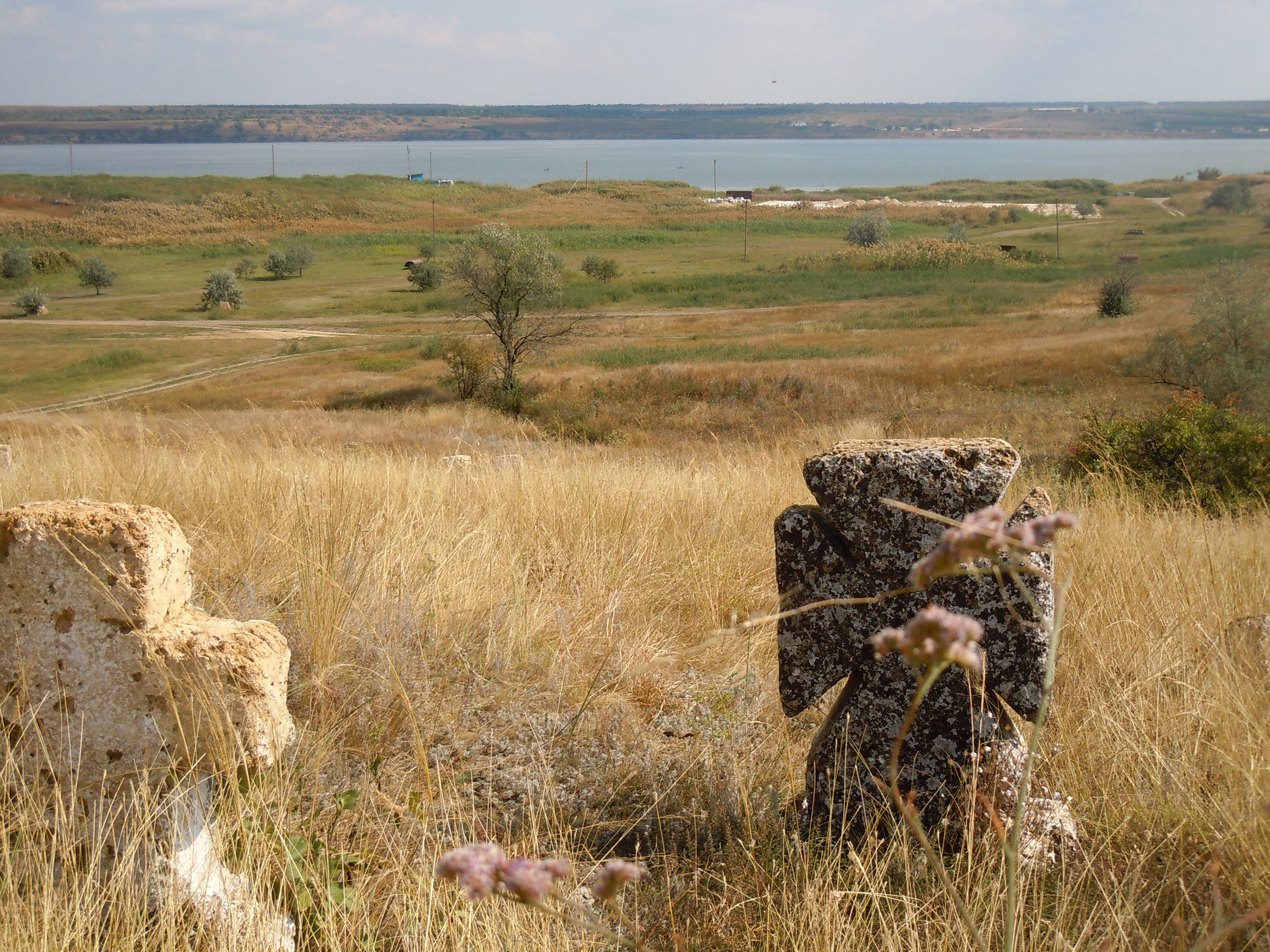
Cossack graves in the steppe, SW Ukraine

The Cossacks founded the administrative centre of Yekaterinodar (literally "Catherine's gift") in 1794. At the same time, however, the Black Sea Cossacks also sent men to many major campaigns of the Russian Empire, such as the suppression of the Polish Kościuszko Uprising in 1794 and the ill-fated Persian Expedition of 1796 where nearly half of the Cossacks died from hunger and disease.

The Host sent the 9th plastun (infantry) and 1st joint cavalry regiments as well as the first Leib Guards (elite) sotnia to aid the Russian Army during the Patriotic War of 1812. The new host also participated in the Russo-Persian War (1826–1828) where they stormed the last remaining Ottoman bastion of the northern Black Sea Coast, the fortress of Anapa, which fell on June 12, 1828. In the course of the Crimean War, the Cossacks foiled attempts by allied forces to land on the Taman Peninsula, whilst the 2nd and 5th plastun battalions took part in the Defence of Sevastopol (1854–1855).

As the years went by, the Black Sea Cossacks continued their systematic penetration into the mountainous regions of the Northern Caucasus. Taking an active part in the finale of the Russian conquest of the Northern Caucasus (1817–1864), they settled regions as these were conquered. To aid them, a total of 70,000 additional ex-Zaporozhians from the Bug, Yekaterinoslav, and finally the Azov Cossack Host migrated there in the mid 19th century. All three hosts needed to be removed to vacate space for the colonisation of New Russia, and with the increasing weakness of the Ottoman Empire as well as the formation of independent buffer states in the Balkans, the need for further Cossack defensive presence in New Russia had ended. They migrated to the Kuban in 1860 and merged with the Caucasus Line Cossack Host, which consisted of migrated Don Cossack elements. Finally, in 1864, the Black Sea Cossacks and the Azov Cossacks were united into the Kuban Cossack Host, ninety years after the destruction of the Zaporozhian Sich.

== Administration ==
Upon creation, the territory of the host was governed by the military government. Later, a dedicated military executive office was created, which was headed by the host's ataman. In military matters, this office was subordinated to Kherson's military governor and, since 1802, to the Crimean Inspectorate. In civil matters, the office was subordinated to the Governor of Taurida Governorate.

== Gallery ==
flags of the Black Sea Cossack host

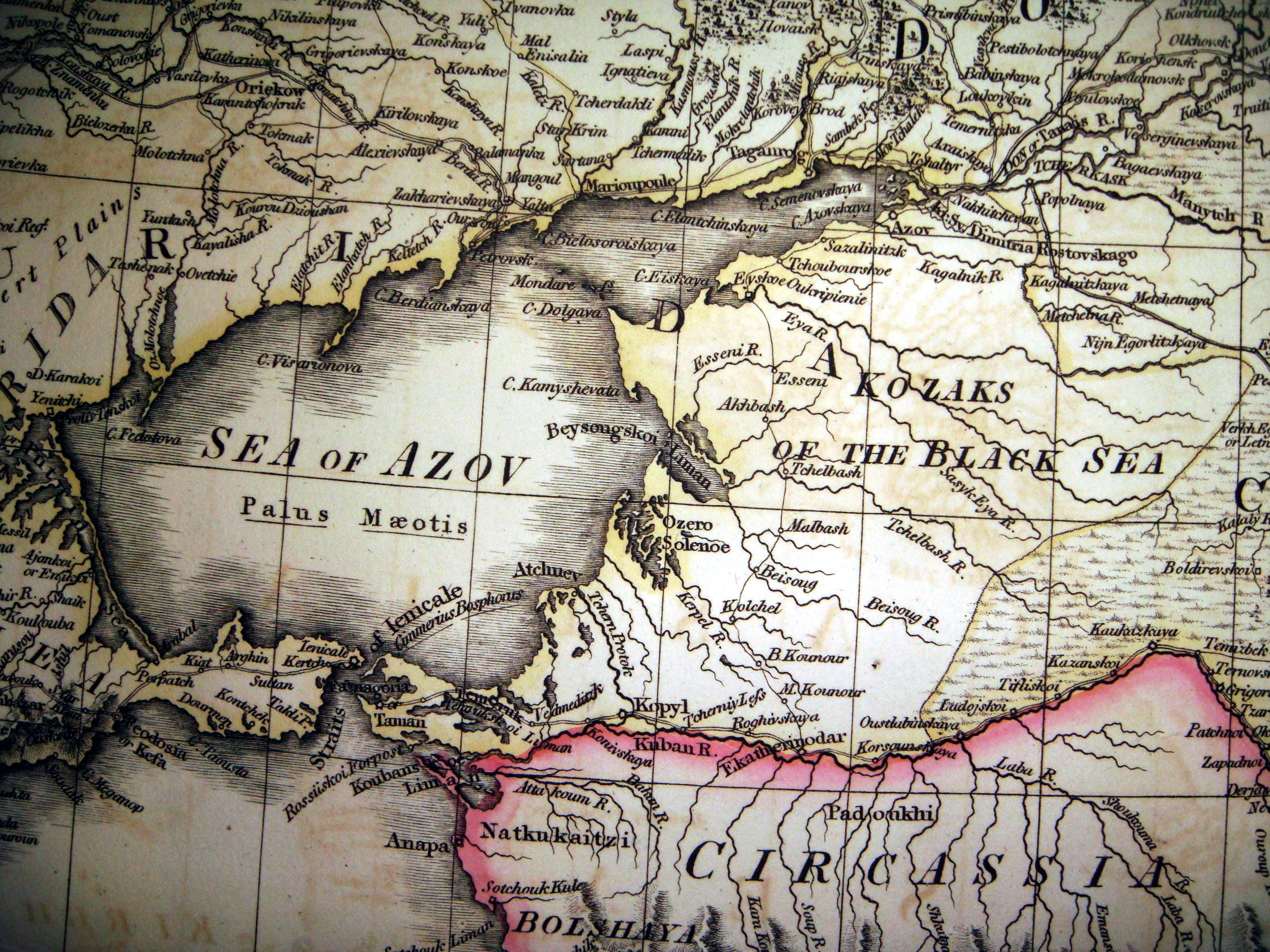
Map of Chornomoria territories in 1806

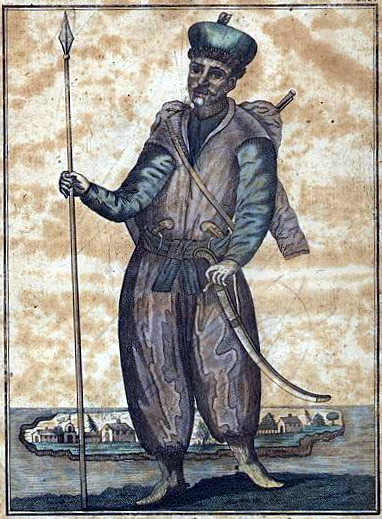
Black Sea Cossack (1781)

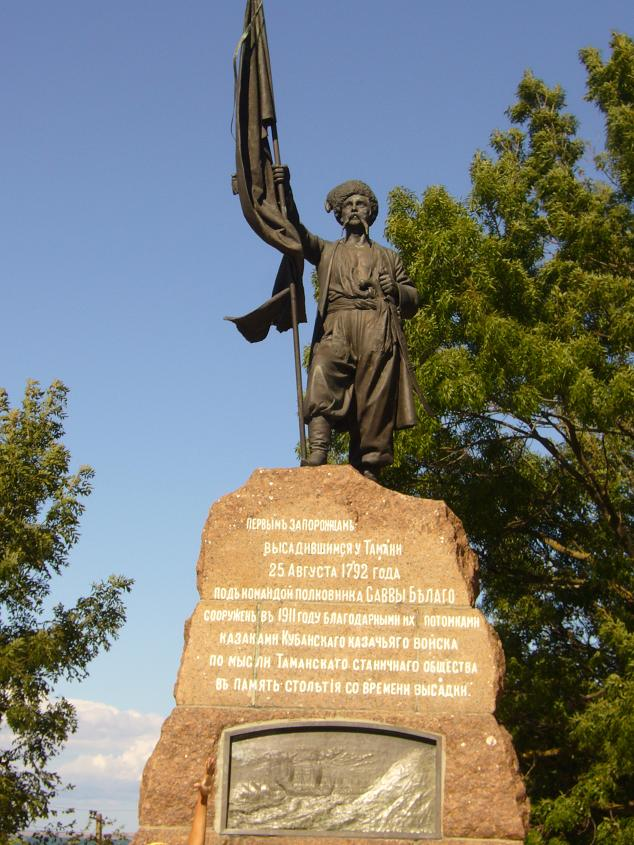
Monument to the first Zaporozhian who landed at the Kuban' shores in 1792, Temryk

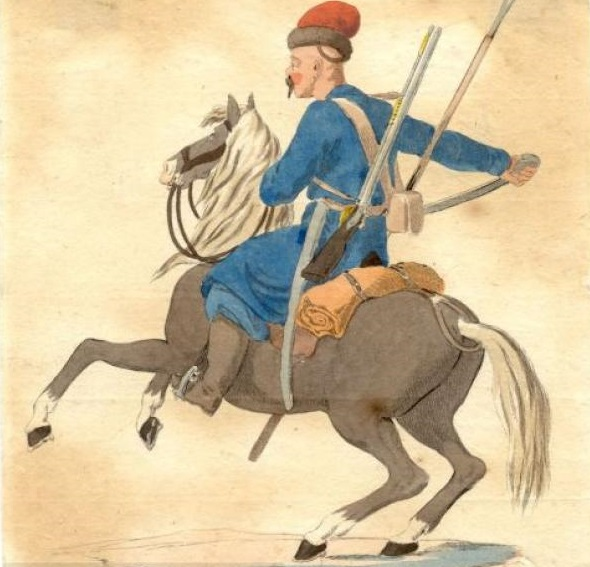
Black Sea Cossack (1804)

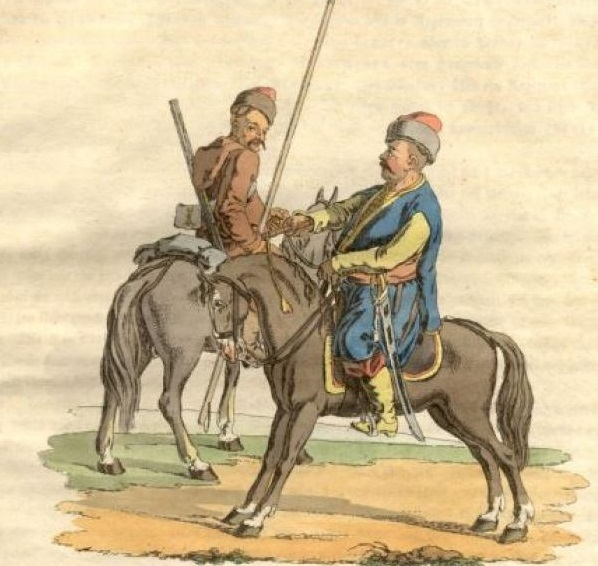
Black Sea Cossacks (1804)

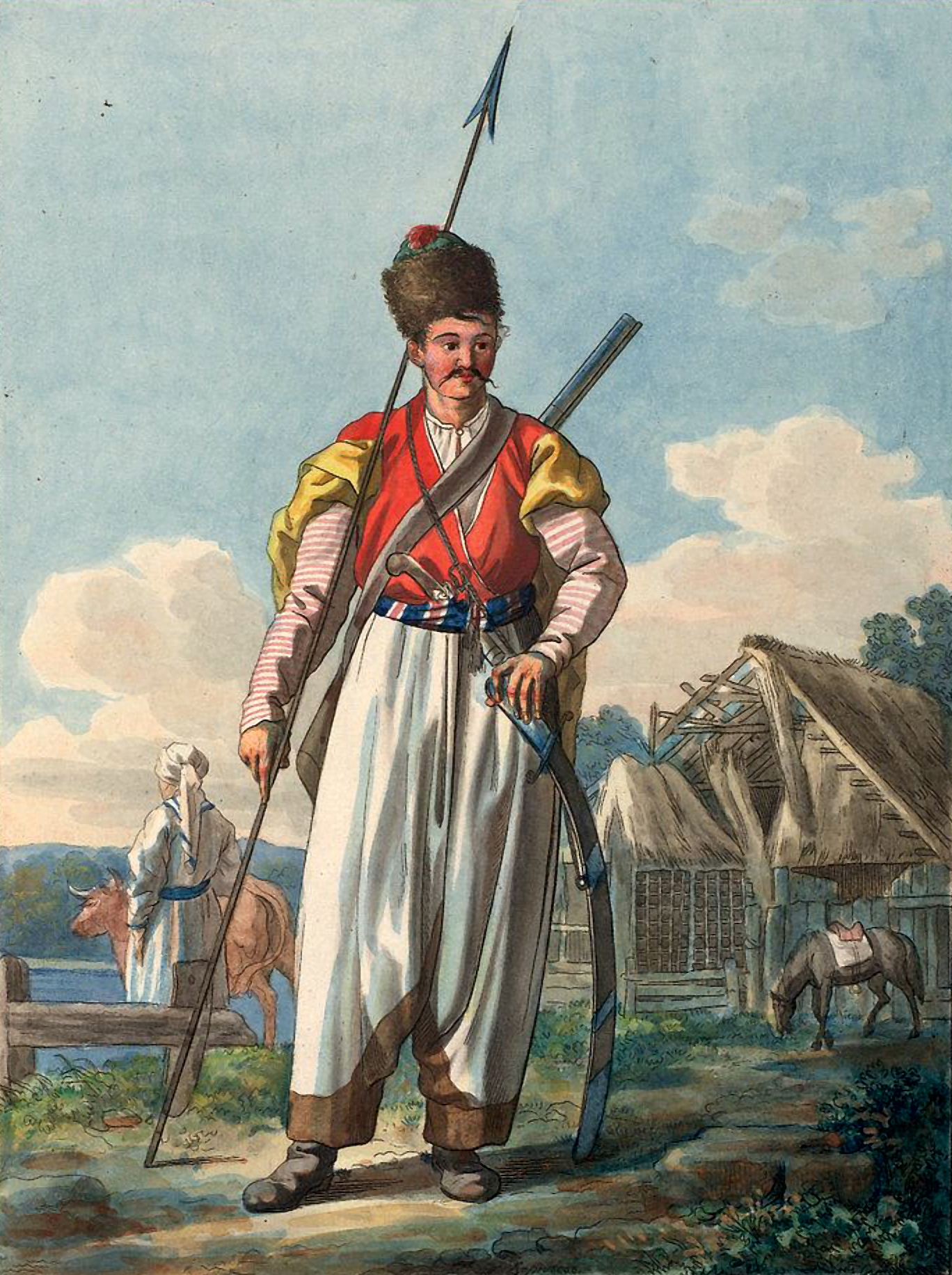
Painting from "Nations of Russia" (1812-13, Paris)

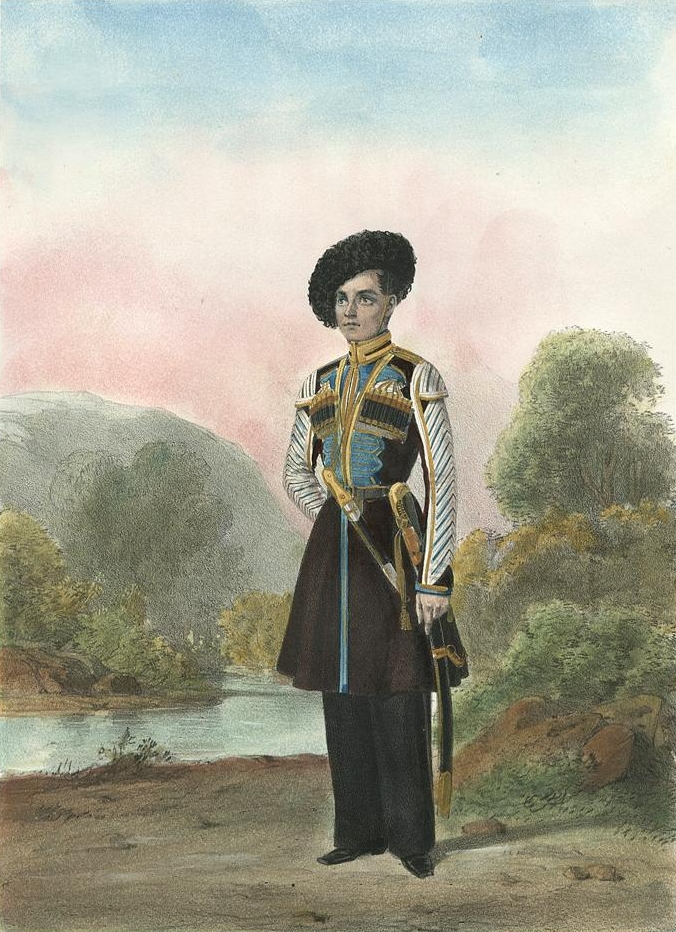
Trumpeter of cavalry and artillery batteries of the Black Sea Cossack Troops (1840-1845)

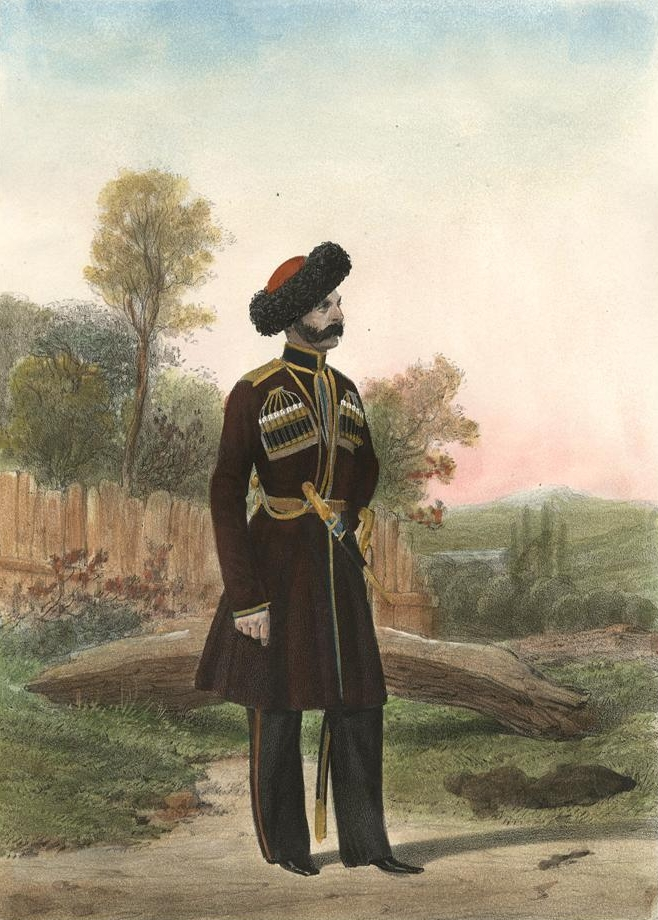
Cossack of cavalry artillery batteries of the Black Sea Cossack Army (1840-1845)

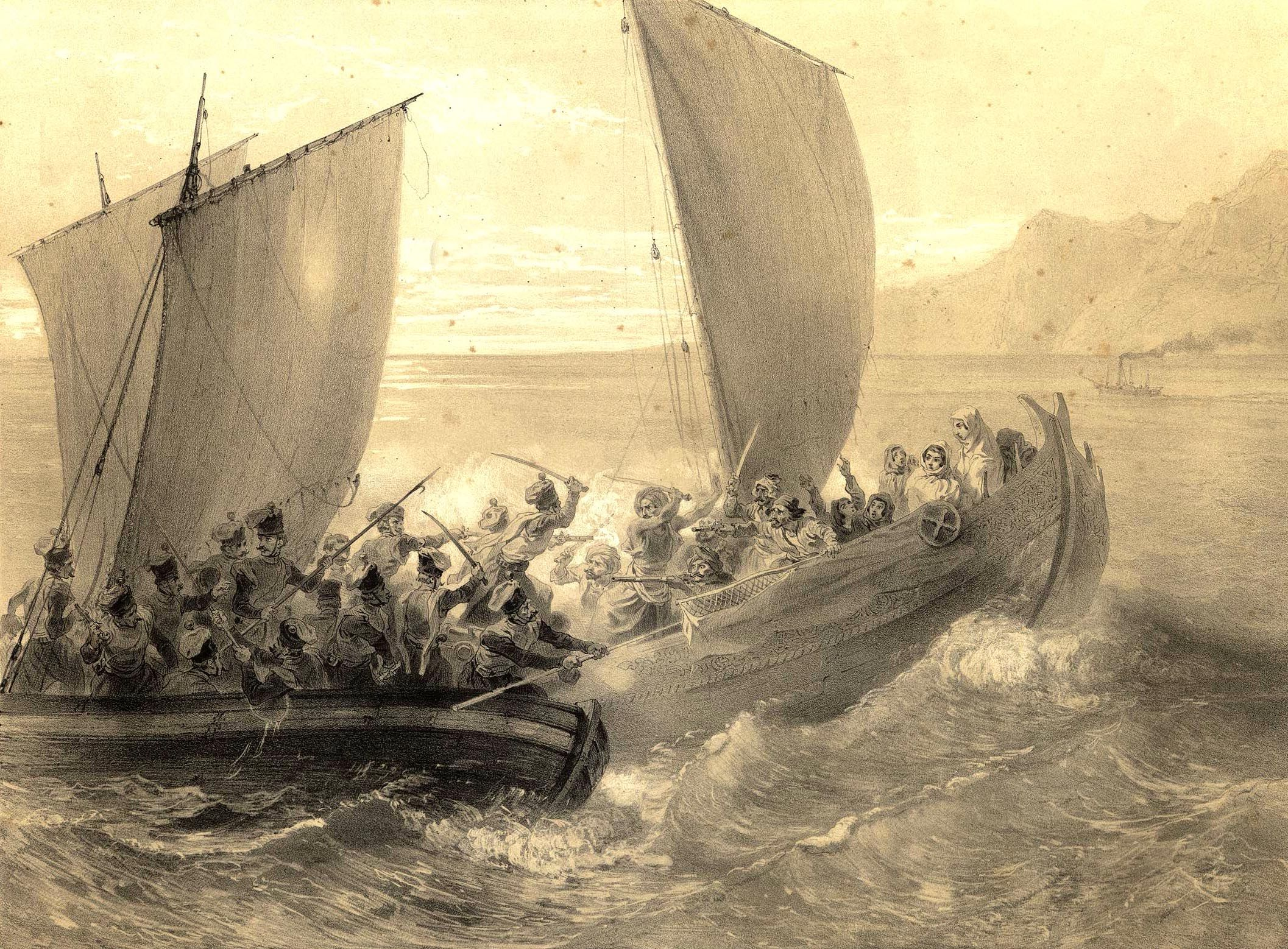
Azov Cossacks fighting Turks near the Black Sea coast (1847)

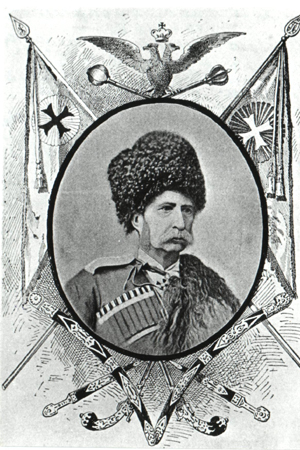
Otaman Yakov Kukharenko (1852)

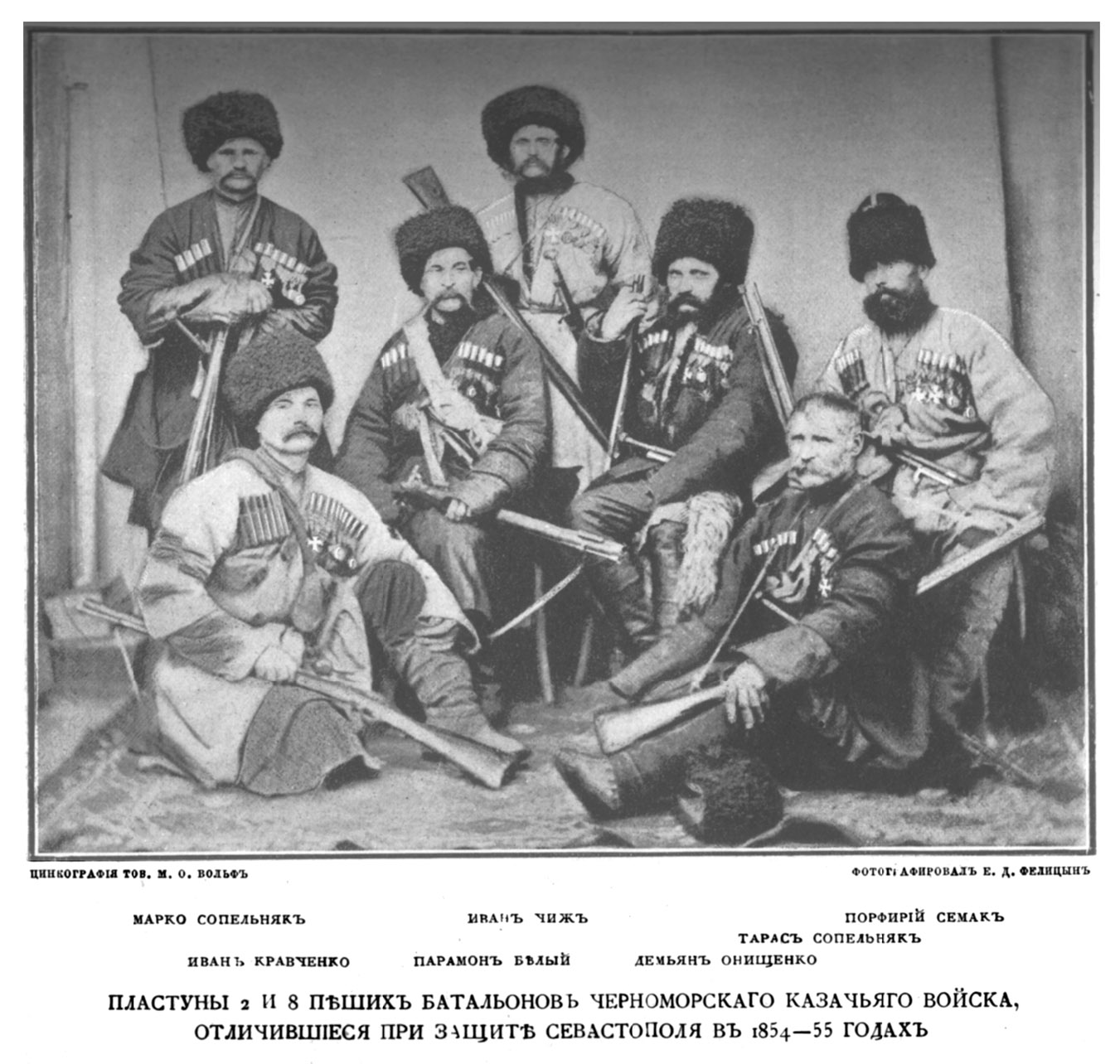
Plastuns of the Black Sea Cossack Army, who distinguished themselves during the defense of Sevastopol (1854-1855)

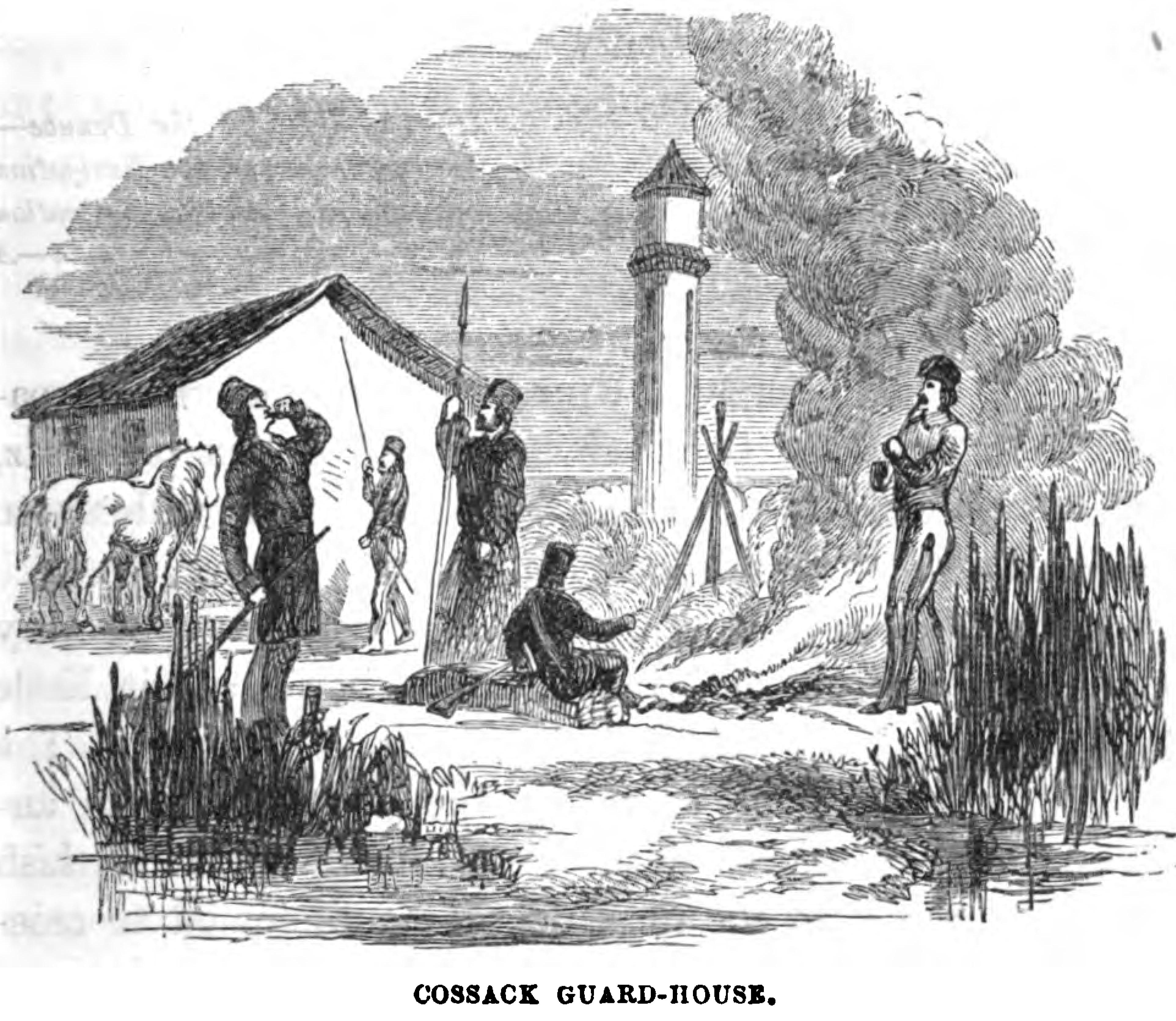
Cossack guard-house by Edmund Spencer (1855)

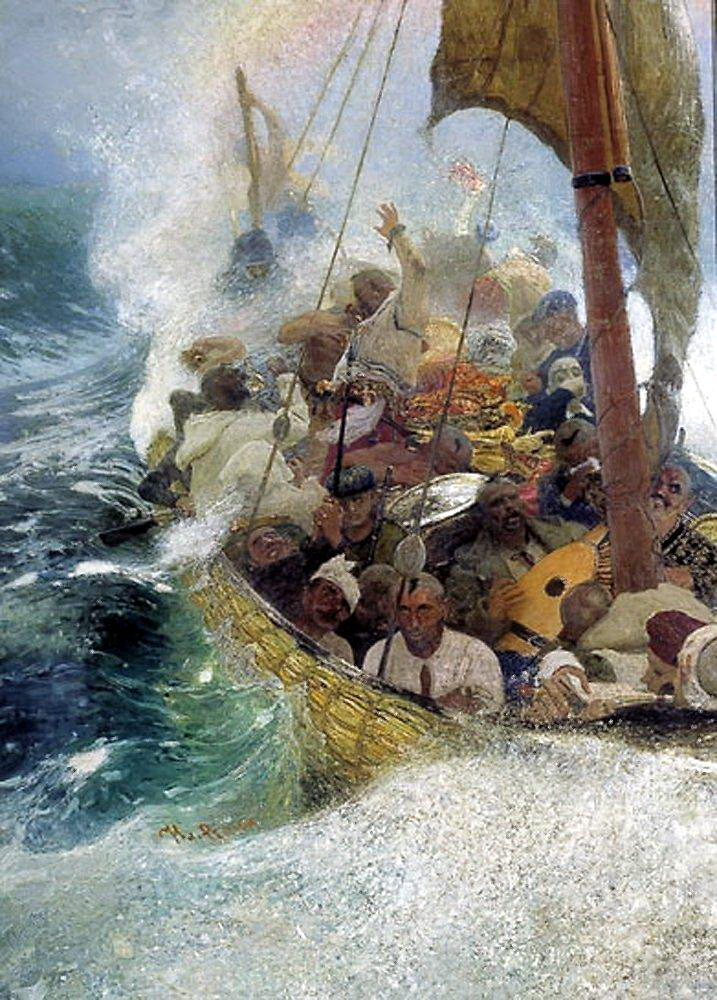
Cossacks on the Black Sea by I.Repin (1908)

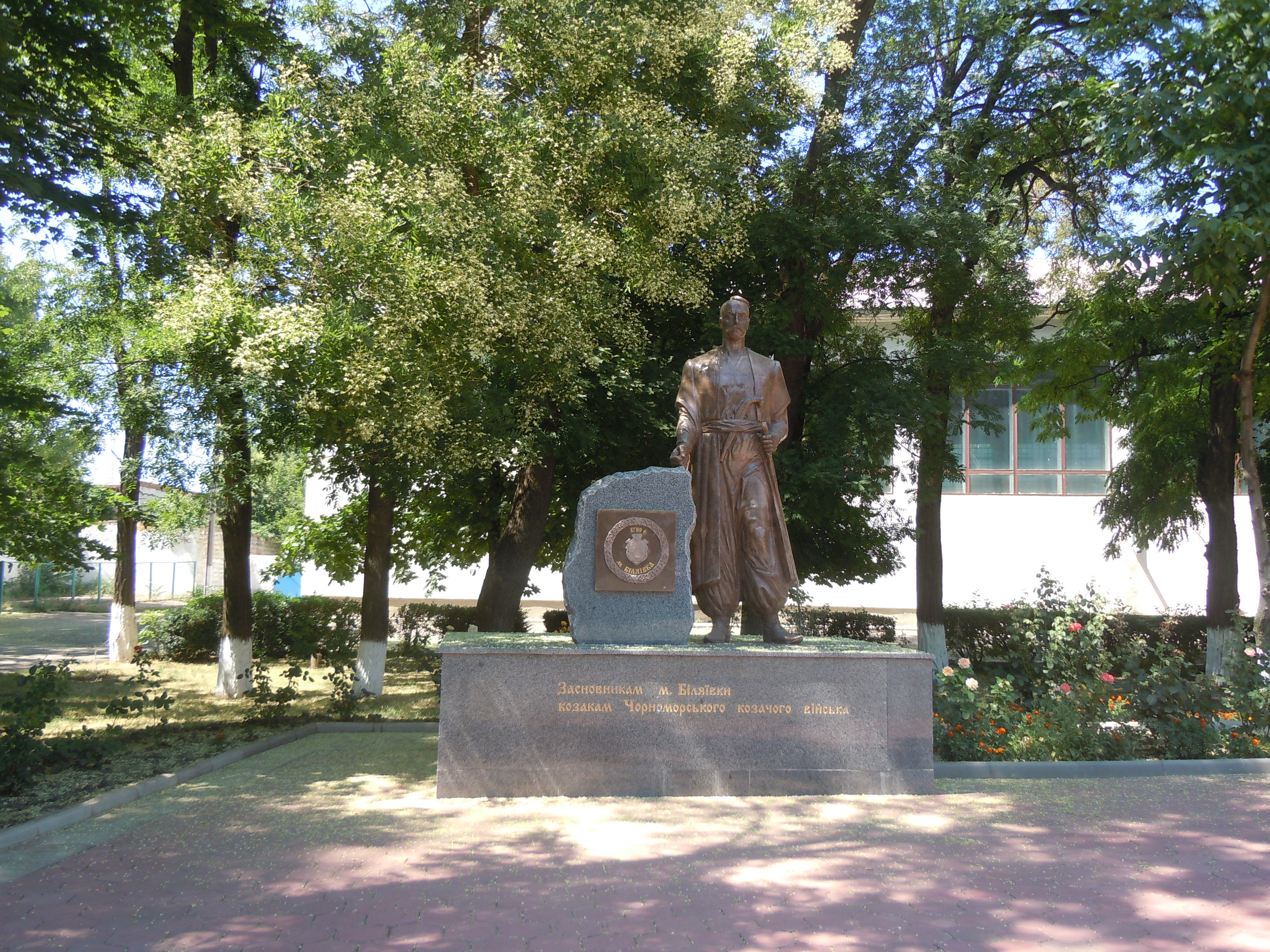
Monument to the founders of Bilyayivka - the Cossacks of the Black Sea Cossack Army. Victory Park, Bilyayivka

== Sources ==
- Азаренкова, А. С.; И. Ю. Бондарь; Н. С. Вертышева (1986) [1986]. Основные административно-территориальные преобразования на Кубани (1793–1985 гг.) (in Russian). Краснодарское книжное издательство.
