= Chuguev uprising =

1819 revolt in Ukraine

The Chuguev uprising was an armed revolt, conducted by military settlers of the Chuguev Regiment in the town of Chuguev (Chuhuiiv) in 1819, against the harsh working conditions and regulations in military settlements, in which military service was combined with farm work, being introduced into the Russian Empire in 1816.

The uprising began on July 9, 1819, with a demand that military settlements be abolished. Peasants from neighboring villages and military settlers from Balakleya (Balakliia) soon joined the military settlers of the Chuguev Regiment in the uprising. In order to crush the revolt, the Russian government dispatched four infantry regiments and two artillery batteries under the command of the minister of war, General Aleksey Arakcheyev. Finally, after a month of fighting, the uprising was crushed. The crushed uprising resulted in the arrests and cruel punishment to about 2,000 rebels, which included 20 rebels being shot and killed, and 400 being subject to hard labor. In 1820, similar revolts occurred in southern Ukraine and involved about 200 different villages.
