= Caucasus Line Cossack Host =

Caucasus Line Cossack Host (Кавказское линейное казачье войско) was a Cossack host created in 1832 to 1860 for the purpose of conquest of the Northern Caucasus. Together with the Black Sea Cossack Host, it defended the Caucasus Fortified Defense Line from the inlet of Terek River to the inlet of Kuban River while the lower reaches of the Kuban were occupied by the Black Sea army. The headquarters of the army was located first in Pyatigorsk, and then in Stavropol.

It consisted of the following regiments:

- Vladikavkaz regiment
- Volga regiment
- Gorsky (Mountain) regiment
- Grebensky regiment
- Caucasus regiment
- Kizlyar regiment
- Labinsky regiment
- Mozdok regiment
- Stavropol regiment
- Sunzhen regiment
- Terek regiment
- Urup regiment
- Khoper regiment

== History ==
In 1777, with the extension of the line of fortresses in the Caucasus to the west from Mozdok to Azov, a part of the Volga army was sent here, settled in five stanitsas, from the Catherine to the Alexander fortress, for about 200 versts. Retaining their former name, the Cossacks formed the Volga Cossack Regiment of five hundred members. Gradually, the Cossack villages moved forward. To reinforce the strength of the army, four civilian villages along the Kuma with a population of up to 4,050 persons of "both sexes" were assigned to it as early as 1832. April 11, 1786, when the Russian government formed a front to fight the robber mountaineers. The local Grebensky Cossacks are reinforced by the Volga and Little Russian Cossacks. From the disparate stanitsas they formed a single front line along the Terek River.

The Caucasian Cossack Line Army was formed (established) in 1832 from five regiments of the Terek Cossacks (Kizlyar, Terek-Semeyny, Grebensky, Mozdok and Gorsky), stationed from the mouth of the Terek River to Mozdok, and five Cossack regiments of the Azov-Mozdok line (Volga, Caucasian, Stavropol, Khoper and Kuban).

At the beginning of the XIX century, the villages of Temizhbek, Kazan, Tiflis, Ladoga and Voronezh were settled on the Caucasian Line. The population of these stanitsas, which made up the Caucasian Cossack Regiment, was recruited from the southern Russian odnodvorets (Kursk, Voronezh, and Oryol provinces). By the middle of the XIX century, odnodvorets would form the main backbone of the emerging linear Cossacks.

The army also included the Sunzhensky (formed in 1817) and the 1st and 2nd Vladikavkaz regiments (formed in 1831 under the name of Little Russia).

The Caucasian Cossack Line Army, together with the Black Sea Cossack Army, occupied the Caucasian defensive line from the mouth of the Terek to the mouth of the Kuban and, together with the Separate Caucasian Corps, participated in the Caucasian War.

In 1838, the Kizlyar and Terek-Family regiments were merged, in 1840 the Labinsk regiment was formed, and in 1850 the Urupsky regiment was formed.

On February 14, 1845, the first Statute of the Caucasian Cossack Line Army was approved.

With the growth of the population in the territory of the army (in the middle of the 19th century it was over 300,000 people) in 1846, most of the regiments were deployed into brigades, and by 1860 the army consisted of 9 brigades and 4 separate regiments.

On November 19, 1860, the entire army was transformed into the Terek Cossack Army, except for two western (right) regiments (Khoper and Kuban), which were combined with the Black Sea Regiment into the Kuban Cossack Army, another source indicated, with the exception of six brigades attached to the Black Sea Army (renamed the Kuban Cossack Army).
