= Semirechye Cossacks =

Cossack host in modern-day Kazakhstan and Kyrgyzstan

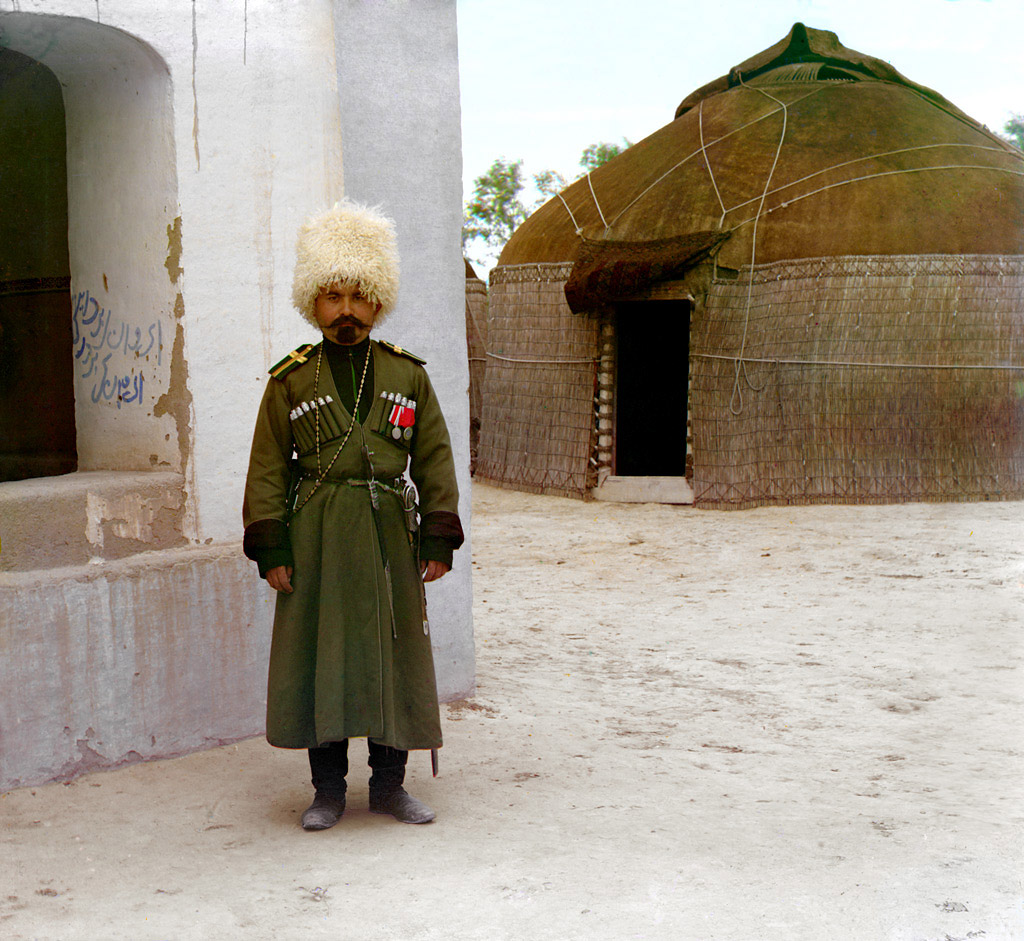
in present-day Kyrgyzstan and Kazakhstan (1911)

Semirechyenskoe Cossack Host (Russian: Семиреченское казачье войско) was a Cossack host in Imperial Russia, located in the Semirechyenskaya Oblast (today comprising most of Kyrgyzstan as well as Almaty oblysy, Taldy-Korgan (Taldyqorghan) oblysy, and parts of the Taraz oblysy and Semey oblysy in Kazakhstan) with the center in Verny.

The Semirechyenskoe Cossack Host was created out of a portion of the Siberian Cossack Host in 1867. It was commanded by a nakazny or ataman (who was also the military governor of the oblast). From 1882, the Semirechye Ataman was responsible to the Governor General of the Steppe; and from 1899 the Governor General of Turkestan.

In the early 20th century, the Semirechye Cossask Host supplied 1 cavalry regiment (4 sotnyas) and 1 platoon of local guards in times of peace. In times of war the host provided 3 cavalry regiments and 12 detached sotnyas. The Semirechyenskoe Cossasks possessed 7,440 km^{2} of land, including 710 km^{2} of arable land. In 1916, The Cossack population in this region numbered approximately 45,000 people.

The Semirechyenskoe Cossask Host played a role in the expansionist colonial policy of the Tsar in Kyrgyzstan and Kazakhstan. Semirechyenskoe Cossacks took part in the conquest of Central Asia and in World War I. During the Russian Civil War, the prosperous leadership of the Semirechyenskoe Cossask Host opposed the Soviets. After the defeat of the White movement in the Steppes in April 1920, the Semirechyenskoe Cossask Host was disbanded. As part of the process of "Decossackization", its former leaders were forcibly transferred to the Russian Extreme North.

Flag of the Semirechyenskoe host

== Distinctions ==
The distinguishing colour of the Semirechyenskoe Cossack Host was "raspberry red" (crimson); worn on the cap bands, shoulder straps and wide trouser stripes of a green uniform of the loose-fitting cut common to the Steppe Cossacks. Officers wore silver epaulettes and braid. High fleece hats were worn on occasion, with crimson cloth tops. Until 1908 cossacks from all hosts were required to provide their own uniforms; together with horses, saddlery and sabers. However the prosperous Semirechyenskoe Host was able to maintain its own clothing factories and stores as community owned resources.
