= Baikal Cossacks =

Host of Cossacks in the Transbaikal region of eastern Russia

Baikal Cossacks were Cossacks of the Transbaikal Cossack Host (Russian: Забайка́льское каза́чье во́йско); a Cossack host formed in 1851 in the areas beyond Lake Baikal (hence, Transbaikal).

== Organisation ==
The Transbaikal Cossack Host was one of those created during the 19th century as the Russian Empire expanded to the Far East and South-East. It remained smaller than the Don Cossacks and other longer-established Hosts. The Transbaikal Cossack Host partially consisted of Siberian Cossacks, Buryats, Evenk (Tungus) military units, and included the peasant population of some of the regions. The military component included three cavalry regiments and three unmounted brigades. Its main purpose was to patrol the Sino-Russian border and perform everyday military duties in the region. The official leader of the Transbaikal Cossack Host had the title of Nakazny ataman ("the one who was appointed"). From 1872 he also served as military governor of the Transbaikal oblast, which had with its headquarters in Chita.

In the early 20th century, the Transbaikal Cossack Host normally supplied one polusotnya (fifty men) of guards for rural policing work, four cavalry regiments, and two batteries in time of peace. During World War I, the Host expanded to one polusotnya, nine cavalry regiments, four batteries, and three reserve sotnyas (each of one hundred men). In 1916, the Cossack population of the Transbaikal Cossack Host numbered 265,000 people, out of which 14,500 men served in the military.

The Chita Cossack Regiment of the Transbaikal Host at the front during 1914-17

== History ==
The Transbaikal Cossack Army is known to have participated in the suppression of the Boxer Rebellion in 1899–1901, the Russo-Japanese War of 1904–1905, and World War I. Many of the Cossack divisions were disbanded in 1917, but were recreated in 1918. During the Russian Civil War, the more prosperous Cossacks joined the ranks of the anti-Soviet armies of General Grigory Semenov and baron Roman Ungern. The poorer Cossacks took an active part in the guerrilla movement.

In 1920 at the end of the Russian Civil War, the Transbaikal Cossack Host was disbanded.

However, the remnant of Baikal Cossacks fled to Manchuria and some of their troops came under the command of the Japanese Manchukuo Imperial Army in order to resist Soviet Union.

== Distinctions ==
The distinguishing colour of the Transbaikal Cossack Host was yellow; worn on the cap bands, epaulettes and wide trouser stripes of a dark green uniform of the loose-fitting cut common to the Steppe Cossacks. Individual regiments were distinguished by numbers on the epaulettes. High lambs-wool hats (papakha) were worn on occasion, with yellow cloth tops. From 1908 the new khaki service jacket of the regular Russian cavalry was adopted, but the yellow shoulder straps of the full dress uniform were retained, as was yellow piping on the blue/grey breeches.
