= Astrakhan Cossacks =

Cossack Host in the Lower Volga region

Astrakhan Cossack Host (Russian: Астраханское казачье войско, romanized: Astrakhanskoye kazachye voysko) was a Cossack host of Imperial Russia drawn from the Cossacks of the Lower Volga region, who had been patrolling the banks of the Volga River from the time of Russia's annexation of Astrakhan Khanate in 1556.

== History ==
In 1737, the Russian government relocated a number of the Volga Cossacks to Astrakhan and formed a Cossack unit of 3 sotnyas, or 300 men, for escorting couriers and correspondence and for guard duty, which would be re-organized into the Astrakhan regiment (5 sotnyas, or 500 men) on March 28, 1750. It was settled along the right bank of the Volga River from Astrakhan to Cherniy Yar (a town in the Astrakhan Oblast). In the early 19th century, the regiment was reinforced with the Cossacks from Tsaritsyn, Kamyshin, Saratov, and also with the remnants of the Volga Cossacks, some Kalmyks and Tatars. In 1817, the Astrakhan regiment (16 sotnyas, by that time) was reorganized into a 3-regiment Astrakhan Cossack Host. In 1833, it was transferred from under the authority of the Caucasus corps to the governor (ataman) of Astrakhan. In 1872, the Astrakhan Cossack Host was divided into 2 departments and re-grouped into 1 cavalry regiment. The Astrakhan Cossack Host possessed 4 stanitsas next to Tsaritsyn, Saratov, Cherniy Yar and Krasniy Yar, 16 yurt stanitsas, 57 khutors (farms), and 808,000 desyatinas of land. One desyatina equals 2,7 acres (11,000 m^{2}).

The Astrakhan Cossack Host took part in the Patriotic War of 1812 and Russo-Turkish Wars of the 19th century. Major General Pyotr Mikhailovich Skarzhinsky was a notable commander(1790-1792). Skarzhinsky would also serve as governor of Astrakhan. At least two mounted regiments of Astrakhan Cossacks saw active service as part of the Tsarist armies in World War I.

During the Russian Civil War, Prince Tundutov formed a small army of Astrakhan Cossacks. A significant number of participated in the Astrakhan offensive. In October–November 1919, the Whites were defeated at Astrakhan, causing the disbandment of the Astrakhan Cossack Host in 1920.

== Organisation in final years ==
In 1916, the total number of Astrakhan Cossacks was approximately 40,000 people. In times of peace, the Astrakhan Cossack Host supplied 1 cavalry regiment (4 sotnyas) and 1 platoon of guards (local police); in times of war - 3 cavalry regiments, 1 platoon of guards, 1 battalion of infantry, 1 special and 1 reserve sotnyas (to a Host total of 2,600 men). In addition, one platoon of the Composite Cossack Regiment of the Imperial Guard was provided by the Astrakhan Host.

The Astrakhan Cossacks were unusual in that there was no single Host area. They had instead evolved into a number of separate districts, communities and farms located in clusters along the right bank of the Volga River between Astrakhan and Chenyi Yar. Although long-established, their relatively small numbers and scattered locations made the Astrakhan Cossacks one of the less significant of the Hosts, overshadowed by the neighboring Don Cossacks.

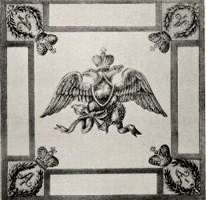
The flag of the Astrakhan-Cossack army in 1818.

== Uniform distinctions ==
The distinguishing colour of the Astrakhan Cossack Host was yellow; worn on the cap bands, epaulettes and wide trouser stripes of a dark blue uniform of the loose-fitting cut common to the Steppe Cossacks. Individual regiments were distinguished by numbers on the epaulettes. Lambs-wool hats (papakha) were worn on occasion with yellow cloth tops.

No spurs were worn by the Astrakhan and other cossack hosts. After 1907 a khaki-grey jacket was adopted for field uniform, worn with blue-grey breeches. The astrakhan hats and yellow trouser stripes of the peacetime uniform were however retained during World War I.
