= Buh Cossacks =

Irregular Cossack army of the Russian Empire

The Bug Cossack Host (Ukrainian: Бузьке козацьке військо; Russian: Бугское казачье войско) was a Cossack host and irregular army within Tsarist Russia, which used to be located along the Southern Bug River. The 2nd Bug Regiment was led by Ataman Pyotr Mikhailovich Skarzhinsky. The 1st regiment was commanded by Ivan Kasperov. In 1788, the two regiments merged into one Bug Cossack (1500 cavalry). The combined regiment was commanded by Lieutenant Colonel Pyotr Mikhailovich Skarzhinsky, who would become the first ataman of the Bug Cossack army.

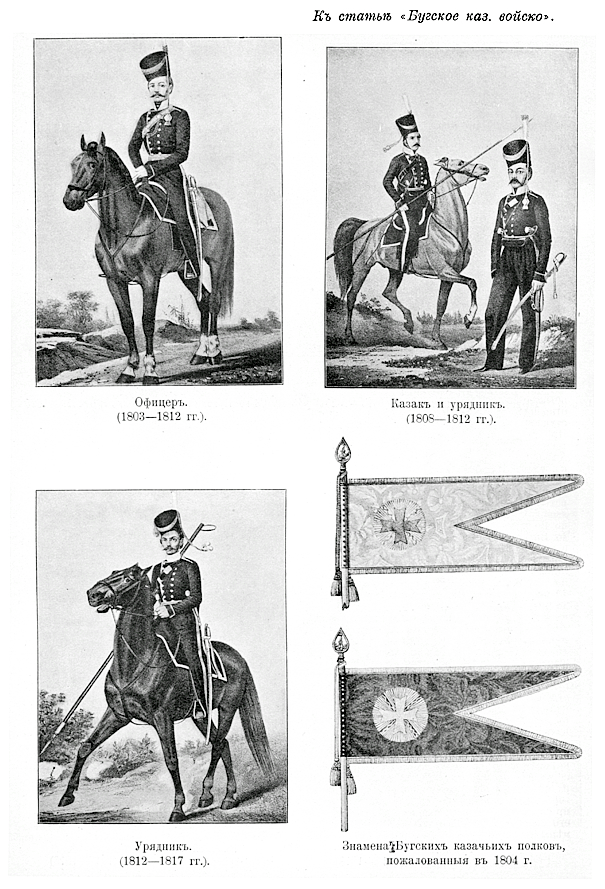
Bug Cossacks

The Bug Cossack Host was formed in 1769 out of Ukrainians, Vlachs, and Bulgarians, who had taken the side of Russia during the Russo-Turkish War of 1768-1774. After the war, the regiment was quartered on the Southern Buh River. In 1788, the Bug Cossack Host became a part of the Yekaterinoslav Cossack Host (disbanded in 1796) and protected the border. It was disbanded in 1800, only to be created again in 1803 under the original name. The Bug Cossack Host had to provide three regiments of 500 men each in the times of war. During the Russo-Turkish War (1806–1812), the Bug Cossacks participated in the siege of Izmail and battles in Bessarabia, Moldova, and Wallachia. During the war with Napoleon I of 1812–14 they conducted operations as partisans. Detachments led by D. Davydov, O. Figner, O. Seslavin, successfully fought in France, for which they were awarded the Order of St. George standard "For Bravery" by Russian Tsal Alexander I. In 1817, it was included into the military settlements and combined with the two Cossack regiments into a Bug Uhlan Division of the Russian Imperial Army.
