= Kuban bandurists =

A Kuban bandurist is a person who plays the Ukrainian plucked string instrument known as the bandura, who is from Kuban, a geographic region of southern Russia surrounding the Kuban River.

The tradition of the kobzar in Kuban migrated from central Ukraine. According to the historian and archivist Ivan Kyiashko the Kuban Cossacks played on the kobza, violin, jaw harp, hurdy-gurdy, basses, tsymbaly, and sopilka.

The Cossacks were especially respectful to itinerant blind singers who played the bandura or kobza. To them, the blind kobzar was a living reminder of their past. In previous eras they themselves were veterans of past battles and campaigns. Their repertoire retold the stories of past battles in the many epic ballads known as dumy (sung epic poems).

== Early development ==
The first known bandurist of the Kuban was Antin Holovaty, who because of his fine the art of playing the bandura was able to gain the territories of the Kuban for the Black Sea Cossack Host. Songs created by him became popular folk songs which continue to be sung by the Cossacks there today. Some are considered hymns. The bandura became a popular instrument in the hands of Kyrylo Rosynsky who often played for the ataman of the Kuban host Yakiv Kukharenko.

Scholars point to some differences between the bandurist of the Kuban with their counterparts in Ukraine. In Ukraine where the feudal system and mentality had lasted well past its abolishment 1861, the art form survived in the hands of blind itinerant musicians who wandered from village to village with the aid of a young children. In the Kuban the bandura became a symbol and an element of Cossack pride, and as a result the cossack bandurist was usually a young person who had all his faculties. The Kuban bandurists however kept close quarters with itinerant kobzars from Ukraine such as Mykhailo Kravchenko, Hryhory Kozhushko, Ivan Zaporozhenko and others.

== The Bandura in the 20th century ==
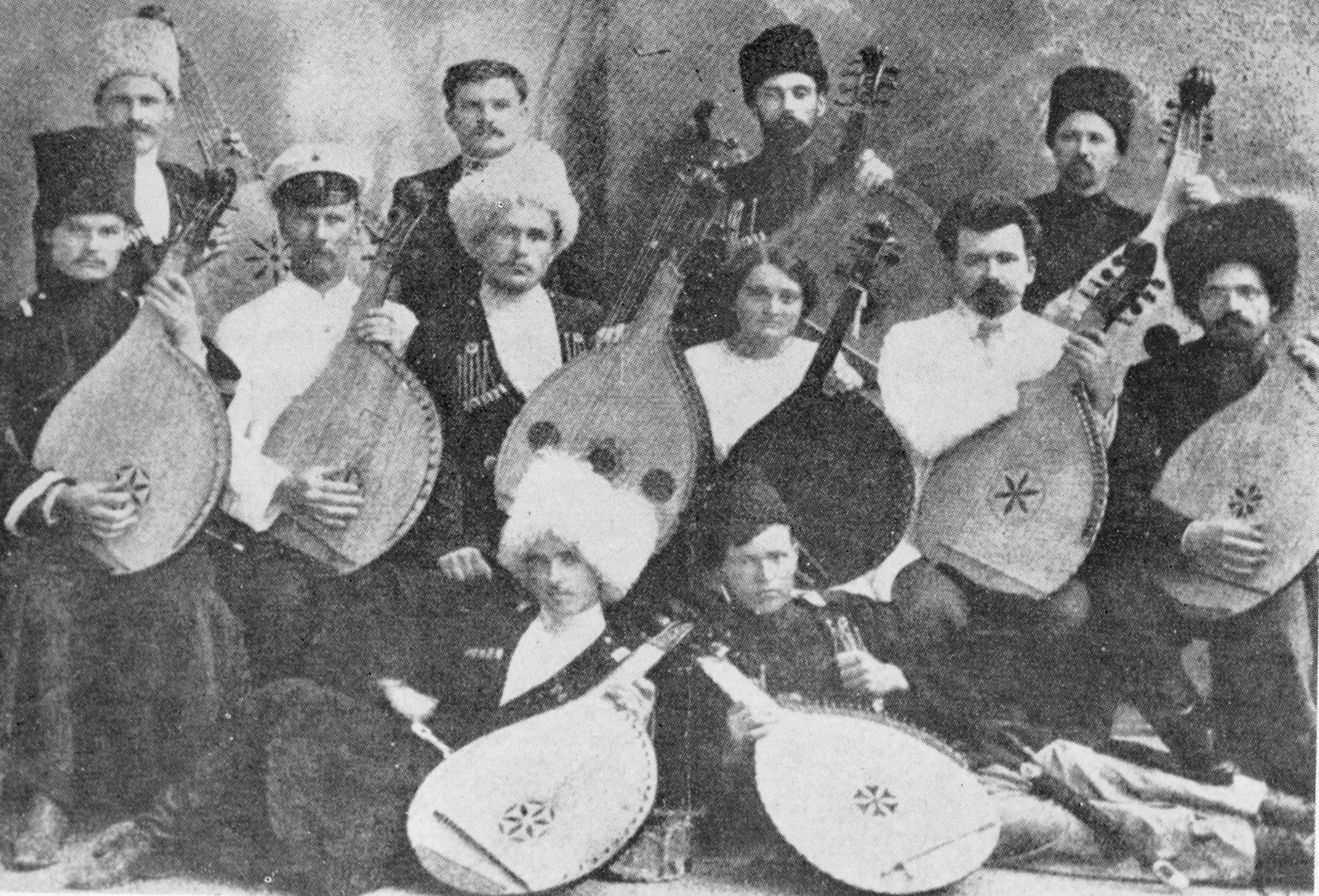
The first bandura school in 1913 directed by V. Yemetz. (centre).

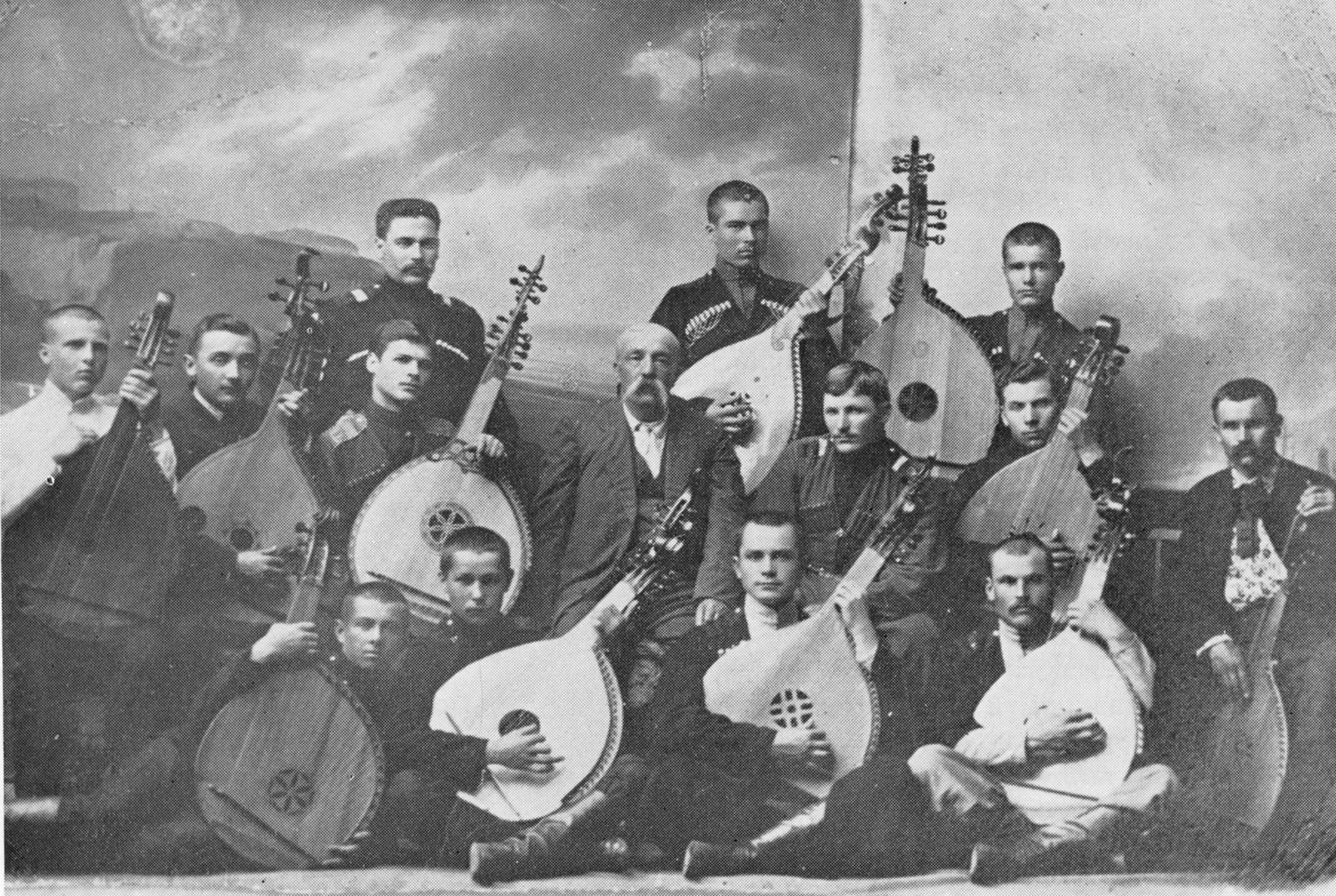
The second summer bandura school. M. Bohuslavsky in the centre.

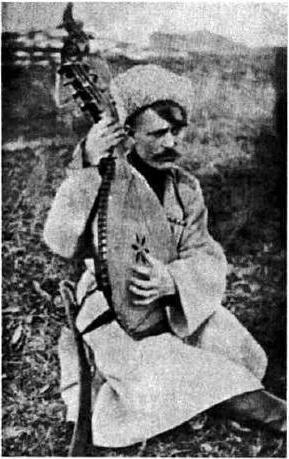
Bandurist Petro Buhai, 1913.

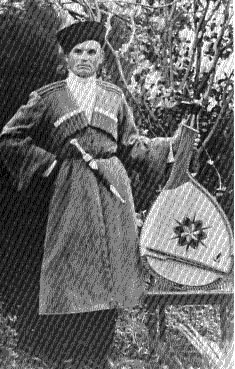
Bandura maker Antin Chorny.

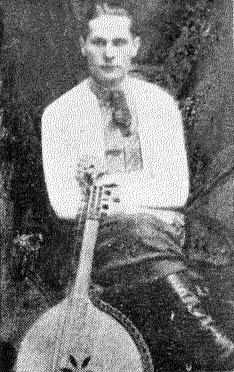
Bandurist M. Teliha, 1923.

In May 1913 Hnat Khotkevych toured the Kuban with concerts performances. He was invited by Mykola Bohuslavsky to return to Yekaterinodar to run a summer bandura school. Khotkevych declined the invitation, however he suggested a young and promising University Student from Kharkiv - Vasyl Yemetz. That summer, the first summer kobzar school was organized in Yekaterinodar. Among his students were Antin Chorny, Oleksiy Obabko who continued running the kobzar school after 1916. The next generation included the bandurists Sava and Fedir Dibrova, Vasil Lyashenko, Dokia Darnopykh, Petro Buhay, and the son of the otaman of the Okhtiskaya stanitsa Mykhailo Teliha (who was shot by the Nazis in 1942 in Kyiv in Babiy Yar), composer of the renowned Cossack March.

== Bandura making ==
Many of the banduras used in the Kuban were made by Kyiv bandura maker Antin Paplynsky, however, the Kuban also had its own bandura makers such as M. Veres (Saratovskaya stanitsa) G. Huzar (Kanevskaya stanitsa) P. Kikot' (Gelendzhik), Kuzma Nimchenko (Pashkovskaya stanitsa) D. Dykun (Yekaterinodar) S. Tuchinsky (Azovskaya stanitsa). Antin Chorny continued making banduras in Argentina. Initially instruments were diatonically tuned, having some 32 strings. In the mid-1920s chromatic instruments became popular.

== Significant contributions ==
Three editions of a Bandura primer were published in Moscow by Kuban bandurist Vasyl Shevchenko. The first professional Bandurist Capella was organized in Yekaterinodar in 1917 by Kravchenko under the auspices of the Prosvita organization. This capella existed a year before the establishment of a similar professional bandurist capella in Kyiv in 1918. Many of the members of the Kyiv Bandurist Capella were in fact Kuban Cossacks who had learned to play the bandura in Yekaterinodar. Kuzma Nimchenko made significant contributions to the development of bandura construction in the late 1920s and early 30s. Kuban bandurists were very prominent in the Kyiv bandurist Capella and also in the establishment of bandura groups in Prague and in the Ukrainian diaspora.

== Early 20th century ==
After the 1902 Archeological conference in Kharkiv, Ukrainian Intellectuals seized the opportunity to use the bandura as a tool for fighting aspsects of the Tsarist regime and as a tool for Ukrainianization. Such prominent writers as Olena Pchilka and Hnat Khotkevych noted the importance of using the bandura as a way of affirming national rights. A result, the Imperial government officials in the Kuban negatively reacted to the rise in the popularity of the bandura.

In the 1920 and early 30s however the bandura flourished in the Kuban. A significant number of Kuban bandurists who had emigrated to the West continued to perform. However, as part of the de-ukrainisation of the Kuban that was implemented in 1930, many of the bandurists such as Svirid Sotnichenko, Konon Bezchasny, Mykola Bohuslavsky were arrested and received terms of imprisonment of 5–10 years or exile. Many more were purged in the Yezhovschina wave of repressions in 1937–38.

== The Bandura in the Kuban today ==
Today the art of the bandura is once again becoming popular in the Kuban particularly amongst the performers of the Kuban Cossack Choir, the Kubantsi ensemble and a number of other semi-professional groups. A museum dedicated to the collection of the kobzar and bandura legacy of the Kuban and Crimea is located in Yalta. The bandura is currently taught in the music college in Krasnodar. Notable exponents include Yuri Bulavin - the concertmaster of the Kuban Cossack choir. The bandura is being taught in the music college of Krasnodar.
