= Kuban Cossacks =

Cossack host by the Kuban River

- Flag of the Kuban Cossacks

- Flag of the Kuban Cossack Host

Languages
- Russian, Don Gutor (local southern Russian dialect), Balachka

Religion
- Predominantly Russian Orthodoxy

Related ethnic groups
- Russians, Ukrainians

Kuban Cossacks (Note: Russian: Кубанские казаки, romanized: Kubánskiye kazáki; Ukrainian: Кубанські козаки, romanized: Kubanśki kozaky) or Kubanians (Note: Russian: кубанцы, romanized: kubáncy; Ukrainian: кубанці, romanized: kubanci) are Cossacks who live in the Kuban region of Russia and form an integral part of Russian Cossackdom. Historically, they constituted a branch of the Cossack hosts in the North Caucasus of the Russian Empire, inhabiting the territories of modern Krasnodar Krai, the western part of Stavropol Krai, as well as Adygea and Karachay-Cherkessia. The Kuban Cossack Host was formed by imperial decree of 19 November 1860, which amalgamated the Caucasus Line Cossack Host with the Black Sea Cossack Host. The remaining units of the Caucasus Line Cossack Host were reorganized into the Terek Cossack Host. The Kuban Host drew its personnel from two main groups: the "Lineitsy", descendants of Don Cossacks (along with Khopyor Cossacks) settled along the Kuban River starting in 1777, and the "Chernomortsy", who partly descended from the Zaporozhian Cossacks and were settled in the region in 1792–1793.

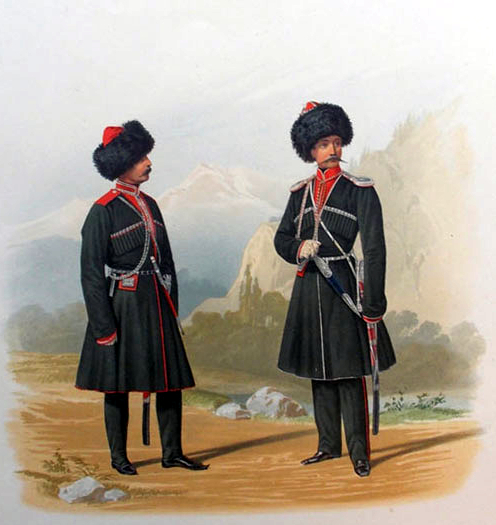
Kuban Cossacks in 1861 (rider and ober-officer in parade uniform). Illustration by Karl Piratsky.

The Kuban Cossack Host (Кубанское казачье войско), the administrative and military unit of the Russian Empire, existed until 1918. During the Russian Civil War, the Kuban Cossacks proclaimed the Kuban People's Republic and took part in the southern theatre of the conflict. Later, they were affected by the Soviet policy of decossackization, between 1919 and 1933. During the Second World War, the Kuban Cossacks fought in the Red Army, while scattered groups collaborated with the Nazi German Wehrmacht. The modern Kuban Cossack Host was re-established in 1990, near the end of the Soviet Union.

== Formation history of the Kuban Cossack Host ==
Following the historical presence of the medieval Brodniki, Don Cossacks were among the first permanent Slavic settlers in the Kuban region. Their organized resettlement began to guard the southern frontier of Russia. In 1708, Don Cossack Old Believers (Nekrasovtsy) fled to the Kuban after the Bulavin Rebellion. The modern Kuban Cossacks claim 1696 as their foundation year, when the Don Cossacks from the Khopyor served as a vanguard in the Azov campaigns of Peter the Great, providing the amphibious and siege capabilities needed to breach the Ottoman fortresses. During this early period, these Cossack detachments launched military raids into the Kuban region, a frontier under the nominal control of the Crimean Khanate and inhabited by nomadic Nogai tribes. In 1784, the Lower Kuban formally passed to the Russian Empire. This integration transformed the new Cossack settlements into a fortified frontline for anchoring further expansion in the Caucasus.

=== Caucasus Line Host ===
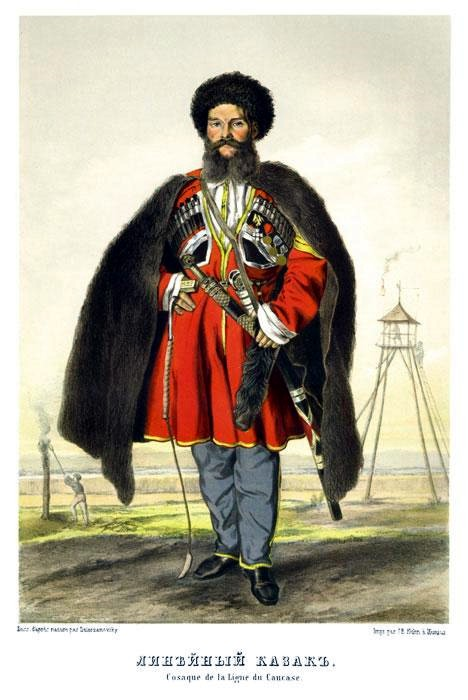
Line Cossack, 1862

The Caucasian Line Cossack Host was an irregular military force of the Russian Empire in the 19th century and was stationed from the mouth of the Terek River to the mouth of the Kuban River. It was formed in 1832 during the Caucasian War of 1817–1864. Its history was closely linked to earlier Cossack formations, above all the Khopyor and Kuban regiments.

The Khopyor Regiment traced its roots between the Khopyor and Medveditsa rivers to 1444. After the Bulavin Rebellion some Bulavin supporters fled to the Kuban and formed the Nekrasov Cossacks. In 1716 Cossacks who had fought in the Great Northern War returned to the Khopyor, and build the Novokhopyorsk fortress. Over the next half-century the Khopyor Regiment grew.

In the central Caucasus, the Khopyor Cossacks took part in campaigns against Kabarda. In 1786, the Host was preceded by the creation of a force called the "Settled Cossacks of the Caucasian Line," composed of Greben, Tersko-Semeiny, and Volga Cossacks, as well as the Mozdok and Khopyor regiments.

On October 25, 1832, the Caucasian Line Cossack Host was officially established. It included the Kizlyar, Tersko-Semeiny, Greben, Mozdok, and Gorsky Cossack regiments, as well as five Cossack regiments of the Azov-Mozdok Line: the Volga, Caucasus, Kuban, Stavropol, and Khopyor regiments. Its headquarters were initially located in Pyatigorsk, and from 1837 in Stavropol. By 1832, the core of the Line Cossacks consisted of descendants of Don Cossacks and Russian odnodvortsy.

Unlike other Cossack hosts, the regiments of the Caucasian Line Host were in constant combat readiness, and they were often commanded by officers of the regular army. In 1845, a Regulation on the Host was approved, defining its structure and tasks. Service lasted 30 years (from 1856, 25 years) and was divided into field service (duty at posts and guards, participation in expeditions) and internal service (guarding stanitsas and escorting prisoners). In 1846, a brigade system was introduced, and by 1860 the Host consisted of 10 brigades, 4 separate regiments, 2 foot battalions, and 4 horse-artillery batteries.

As the Russian Empire moved toward victory in the Caucasian War, the Host took part in the campaigns against the Caucasian tribes. During the Crimean War of 1853–1856, the Host was awarded the Host St. George Banner "For Bravery" in 1856. In 1860, the Vladikavkaz, Mozdok, Greben, Kizlyar, 1st and 2nd Sunzha Cossack regiments were awarded St. George Banners.

On November 19, 1860, the Caucasian Line Cossack Host was abolished in connection with the administrative reform in the Caucasus. When the Kuban Cossack Host was formed, its seniority was inherited from the Khopyor Regiment, the oldest component, which traced its history to 1696, when the Khopyor Cossacks distinguished themselves during the Azov campaigns of Peter I.

=== Zaporozhian Cossaks ===
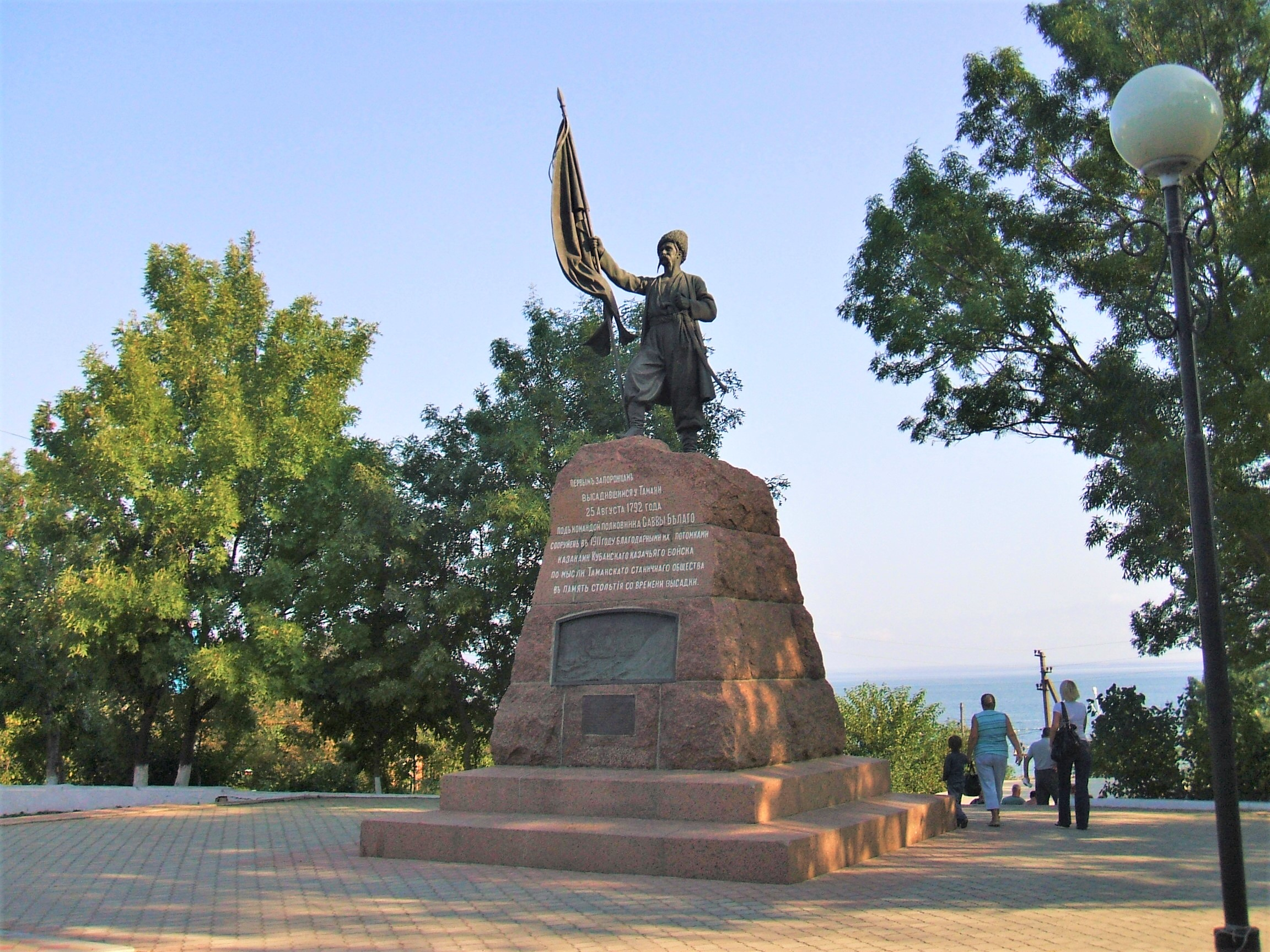
The Monument to the Cossacks in Taman

The Zaporozhian Cossacks inhabited the middle Dnieper region. By the late 18th century, their military role had diminished. After the Treaty of Küçük Kaynarca (1774) and the annexation of the Crimean Khanate (1783), the southern frontier became more stable, and the Russian government saw less need for the Zaporozhian Sich as a military outpost. In 1775, after numerous attacks on Serbian colonisers, the Russian Empress Catherine the Great had Grigory Potemkin destroy the Zaporozhian Host. The operation was carried out by General Pyotr Tekeli. The liquidation of the Sich in 1775 and the incorporation of its lands into the Novorossiysk and Azov governorates were measures aimed at extending effective administration, securing the southern borderlands, and integrating the region into the empire.

The Zaporozhians scattered; some (five thousand men or 30% of the host) fled to the Ottoman-controlled Danube area. Others joined the Imperial Russian Husar and Dragoon regiments, while most turned to local farming and trade.

A decade later, the Russian administration was forced to reconsider its decision, with the escalation of tension with the Ottoman Empire. In 1778 the Turkish sultan offered the exiled Zaporozhians the chance to build a new Danubian Sich. Potemkin suggested that the former commanders Antin Holovaty, Zakhary Chepiha and Sydir Bily round the former Cossacks into a Host of the loyal Zaporozhians in 1787.

The new host played a role in the Russo-Turkish War (1787–1792), and for their loyalty and service to the Russian Empress, they were resettled to the Kuban region, which had been previously inhabited by Nogai nomadic groups. This settlement subsequently served as a strategic base during the Caucasus War, enabling the Russian military to push its defensive lines further into Circassia. Renamed the Black Sea Cossack Host, a total of 25,000 men made the migration in 1792-93. By 1794, former Zaporozhian Cossacks constituted no more than 30% of the Black Sea Cossack Host, with the remaining 70% composed of various volunteers recruited during the Russo-Turkish War of 1787–1791 and others who joined the Host on its way to the Kuban.‌

=== Caucasian Line Cossacks on the Russian frontier (1777–1860) ===
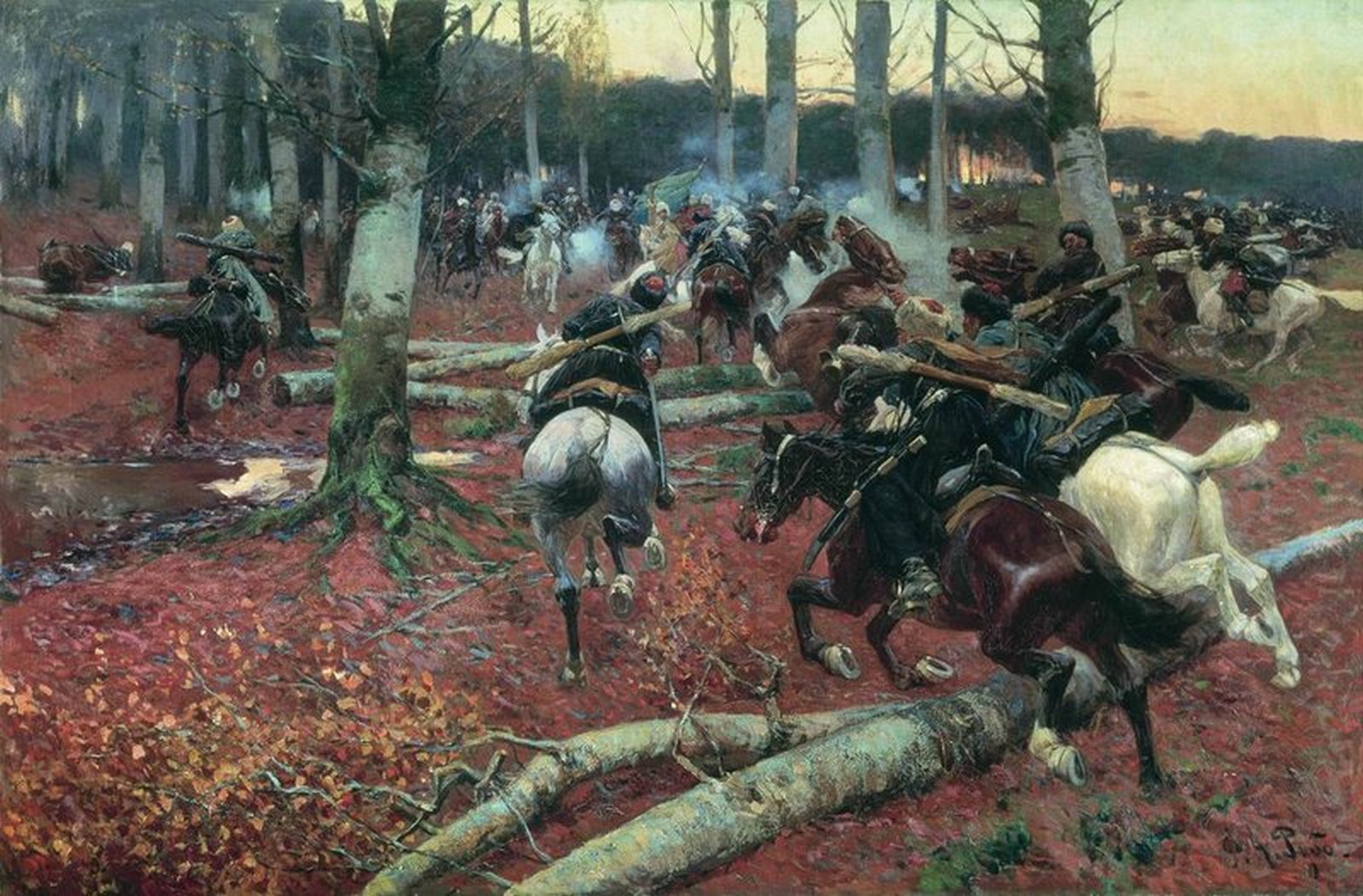
Cossack reconnaissance during the Caucasus wars, by Franz Roubaud

During the Russo-Turkish War (1768–1774), the Don Cossacks and the Khopyor Cossaks took part in the campaign, and in 1770 – then numbering four settlements – requested to form a regiment. Owing to their service in the war, on 6 October 1774 Catherine the Great issued a manifesto granting their request.

The end of the war and the Treaty of Küçük Kaynarca brought Russia's frontiers south from the Kuban River's entry into the Azov Sea along its right bank and right to the bend of the Terek River. This created a 500-verst undefended border, and in the summer of 1777 the Khopyor regiment – in addition to the remnants of the Volga Cossacks and a Vladimir Dragoon regiment – were re-settled in the Northern Caucasus to build the Azov-Mozdok defence line. This marked the start of the Caucasus War.

The Khopyor regiment was responsible for the western flank of the line. In 1778-1782, Khopyor Cossacks founded four stanitsas: Stavropolskaya (next to the fortress of Stavropol, established on 22 October 1777), Moskovskaya, Donskaya and Severnaya – with approximately 140 Cossack families in each. In 1779, the Khopyor regiment was given its own district. In 1825-1826 the regiment began its first expansions, pushing westwards to the bend of the Kuban River and founding five new stanitsas (the so-called new-Kuban line: Barsukovskaya, Nevinnomysskaya, Belomechetskaya, Batalpashinskaya (modern Cherkessk), Bekeshevskaya and Karantynnaya (currently Suvorovskaya). In 1828 the Khopyor Cossacks participated in the conquest of Karachay and became part of the first Russian expedition to reach the summit of Elbrus in 1829.

To streamline administration along the frontier in 1832 military reform united ten regiments from the mouth of the Terek River all the way to the Khopyor in the western Kabarda, forming a single Caucasus Line Cossack Host. The Khopyor regiment was also given several civilian settlements, raising its manpower to 12,000. With the further advance to the Laba River the Khopyor district was split into two regiments, and Spokoynaya, Ispravnaya, Podgornaya, Udobnaya, Peredovaya, Storozhevaya formed the Laba line.

=== Black Sea Cossack Host ===
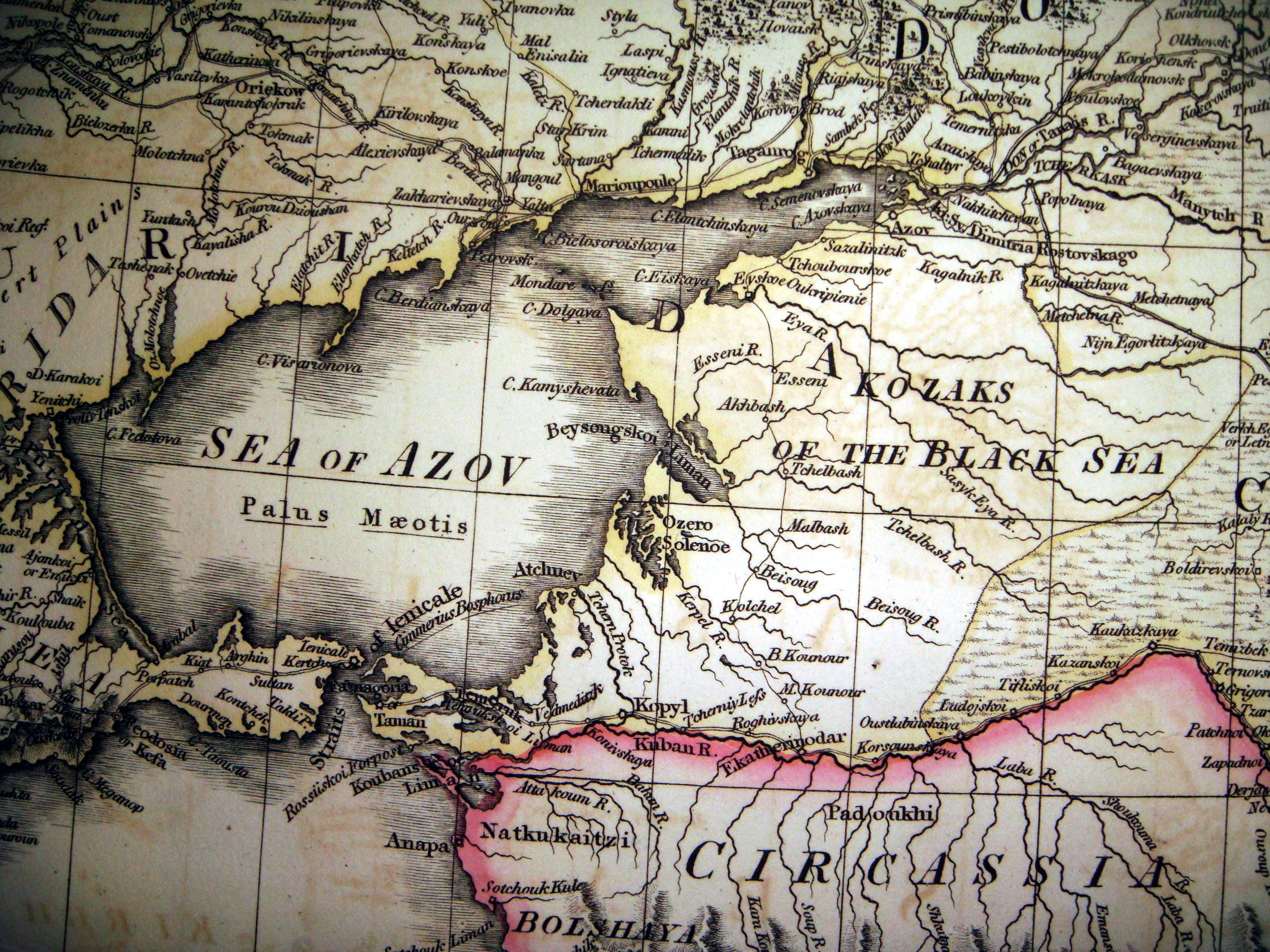
The settlement of the Black Sea Cossacks in 1806

As a constituent part of the Russian Empire's military forces, many traditions of the Zaporozhian Cossacks continued in the Black Sea Cossacks, such as the formal election of the host administration, but in some cases, new traditions replaced the old. Instead of a central Sich, a defence line was formed from the Kuban River Black Sea inlet to the Bolshaya Laba River inlet. The land north of this line was settled with villages called stanitsas. The administrative centre of Yekaterinodar (literally "Catherine's gift") was built. The Black Sea Cossacks participated in many major campaigns, such as the suppression of the Polish Kościuszko Uprising in 1794, the ill-fated Persian Expedition of 1796 where nearly half of the Cossacks died from hunger and disease, and sent the 9th plastun (infantry) and 1st joint cavalry regiments as well as the first Leib Guards (elite) sotnia to aid the Russian Army in the Patriotic War of 1812. The new host participated in the Russo-Persian War (1826–1828) where they stormed the last remaining Ottoman bastion of the northern Black Sea coast, the fortress of Anapa, in 1828. In the course of the Crimean War of 1853 to 1856, the Cossacks foiled any attempts of allied landing on the Taman Peninsula, whilst the 2nd and 5th plastun battalions took part in the Defence of Sevastopol.

In the land they left behind, the Buh Cossacks were able to provide a strong buffer from the Danubian Sich. After the Russo-Turkish War (1828–1829) most of the Danube Cossacks officially turned themselves over to Russia and under amnesty were resettled between the Prymorsk and Berdyansk, forming the Azov Cossack Host.

== Expansion ==
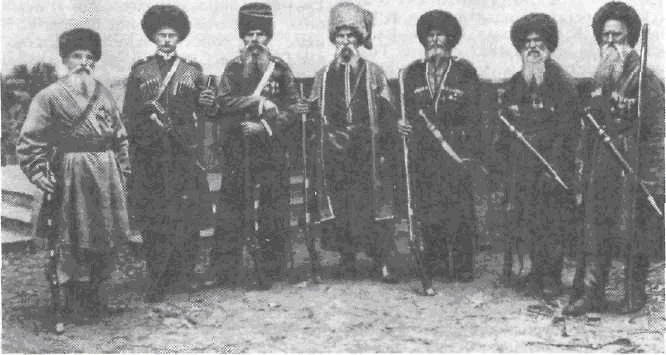
Late 19th century

As the years went by, the Cossacks continued its systematic penetrations into the mountainous regions of the Northern Caucasus. Taking an active part in the finale of the Russian conquest of the Northern Caucasus, they settled the regions each time these were conquered. To aid them, a total of 70 thousand additional ex-Zaporozhians from the Bug, Yekaterinoslav, and finally the Azov Cossack Host migrated there in the mid 19th century. All three of the former were necessary to be removed to vacate space for the colonisation of New Russia, and with the increasing weakness of the Ottoman Empire as well as the formation of independent buffer states in the Balkans, the need for further Cossack presence had ended. They made the migration to the Kuban in 1860. Black Sea Cossacks resettled to the lower Kuban and faced the Caucasian mountain tribes. To their east at that time stood the Caucasus Line Cossack Host.

=== Apogee of the Kuban Host ===
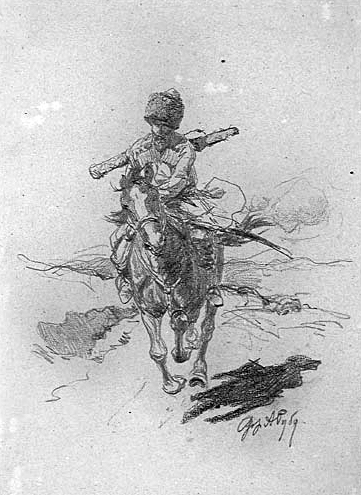
Kubanets a sketch by Franz Roubaud.

The new Host grew to be the second largest in Russian Empire after the Don Cossack Host. The Kuban Cossacks continued to make an active part in the Russian affairs of the 19th century starting from the finale of the Russian-Circassian War which ceased shortly after the hosts' formation. A small group took part in the 1873 conquest that brought the Khanate of Khiva under Russian control. Their largest military campaign was the Russo-Turkish War (1877–1878), on both the Balkan and the Caucasus fronts. The latter in particular was a strong contribution as the Kuban Cossacks made 90% of the Russian cavalry. Famous achievements in the numerous Battles of Shipka, the defence of Bayazet and finally, in decisive and victorious Battle of Kars where the Cossacks were the first to enter. Three Kuban Cossack regiments took part in the storming of Geok Tepe in Turkmenistan in 1881. During the Russo-Japanese War (1904–1905), the host mobilised six cavalry regiments, five plastun battalions and one battery to the distant region of Russia.

The Cossacks also carried out the second strategical objective, the colonisation of the Kuban land. In total, the host owned more than six million tithes, of which 5.7 million belonged to the stanitsas, with the remaining in the reserve or in private hands of Cossack officers and officials. Upon reaching the age of 17, a Cossack would be given between 16 and 30 tithes for cultivation and personal use. With the natural growth of the population, the average land that a Cossack owned decreased from 23 tithes in the 1860s to 7.6 in 1917. Such arrangements, however ensured that the colonisation and the cultivation would be very rational.

The military purpose of the Kuban was echoed in its administration pattern. Rather than a traditional Imperial Guberniya (governorate) with uyezds (districts), the territory was administered by the Kuban Oblast which was split into otdels (regions, which in 1888 counted seven). Each otdel would have its own sotnias which in turn would be split into stanitsas and khutors. The ataman (commander) for each region was not only responsible for the military preparation of the Cossacks, but for the local administration duties. Local Stanitsa and Khutor atamans were elected, but approved by the atamans of the otdel. These, in turn, were appointed by the supreme ataman of the host, who was in turn appointed directly by the Russian Emperor. Prior to 1870, this system of legislature in the Oblast remained a robust military one and all legal decisions were carried out by the stanitsa ataman and two elected judges. Afterwards, however, the system was bureaucratised and the judicial functions became independent of the stanitsas.

The more liberal policy of the Kuban was directly mirrored in the living standards of the people. One of the central features of this was education. By 1860, the host had one male high school and 30 elementary schools. In 1863, the first periodical Кубанские войсковые ведомсти (Kubanskiye voiskovye vedomsti) began printing, and two years later the host's library was opened in Yekaterinodar. In all, by 1870, the number of schools in rural stanitsas increased to 170.

During the administrative reforms of Alexander II in 1860, the military territories of the Kuban Oblast and Terek Oblast were separated from the civilian Stavropol Governorate. This administrative shift allowed the Stavropol region to develop primarily as a civil province populated by migrating peasant families. However, the governorate still retained a significant Cossack population, and the imperial government carefully preserved neighboring military lands to secure the territorial and economic foundations of the Kuban and Terek Cossack hosts. These migrations led to a Armenian and Ukrainian minorities to form. Such that by 1888, the non-Cossack share of Kuban Oblast was 48%. Other administrative reforms, prevented the Cossacks from colonising regions of the Kuban such as its Black Sea Coast, where a separate Black Sea Governorate existed.

=== Russian Revolution and Civil War ===
During the Russian Revolution and resulting Civil War, the Cossacks found themselves conflicted in their loyalties. In October 1917, the Kuban Soviet Republic and the Kuban Rada were formed simultaneously, with both proclaiming their right to rule the Kuban. Shortly after the Rada declared a Kuban National Republic, but this was soon dispersed by Bolshevik forces. While most Cossacks initially sided with the Rada, many joined the Bolsheviks who promised them autonomy.

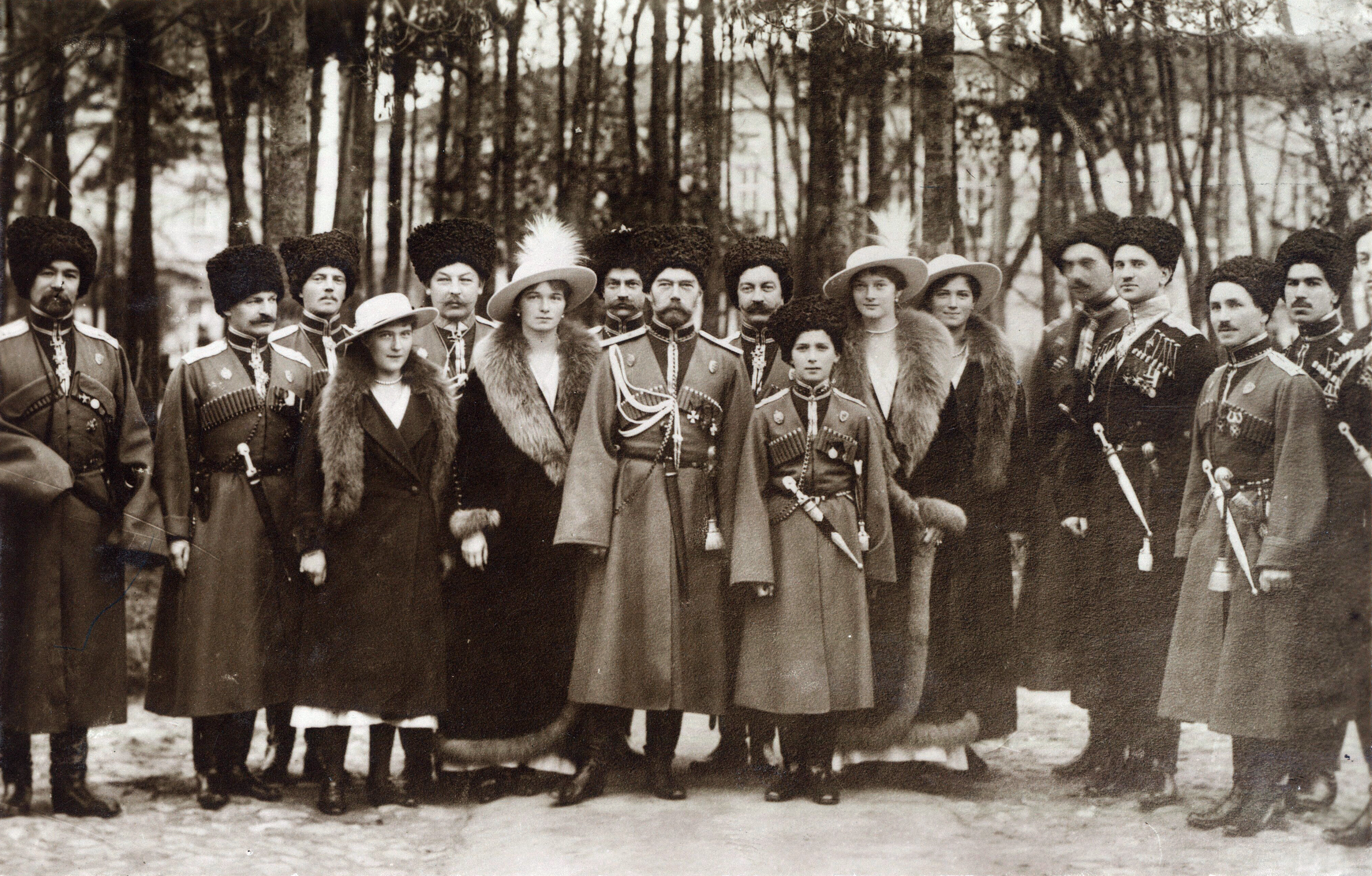
Kuban Cossacks of the Imperial Escort pose with Nicholas II and his family in October 1916.

In March 1918, after Lavr Kornilov's successful offensive, the Kuban Rada placed itself under his authority. With his death in June 1918, the Kuban government engaged in negotiations with the Ukrainian State under Hetman Pavlo Skoropadsky. Additionally, there was an internal struggle among the Kuban cossacks over loyalty towards Anton Denikin's Russian Volunteer Army and the Ukrainian People's Republic.

On 6 November 1919, Denikin's forces surrounded the Rada, and with the help of Ataman Alexander Filimonov arrested ten of its members, including the Ukrainophile, P. Kurgansky, who was the premier of the Rada, and publicly hanged one of them for treason. Many Cossacks joined Denikin and fought in the ranks of the Volunteer Army. In December 1919, after Denikin's defeat and as it became clear that the Bolsheviks would overrun the Kuban, some of the pro-Ukrainian groups attempted to restore the Rada and to break away from the Volunteer Army and fight the Bolsheviks in alliance with Ukraine; however, by early 1920 the Red Army took most of Kuban, and both the Rada and Denikin were ousted.

The Soviet policy of de-Cossackization repressed Cossacks and aimed to eliminate Cossack distinctness. The de-Cossackization is sometimes described as an act of genocide.

=== World War II ===
==== Red Army Cossacks ====
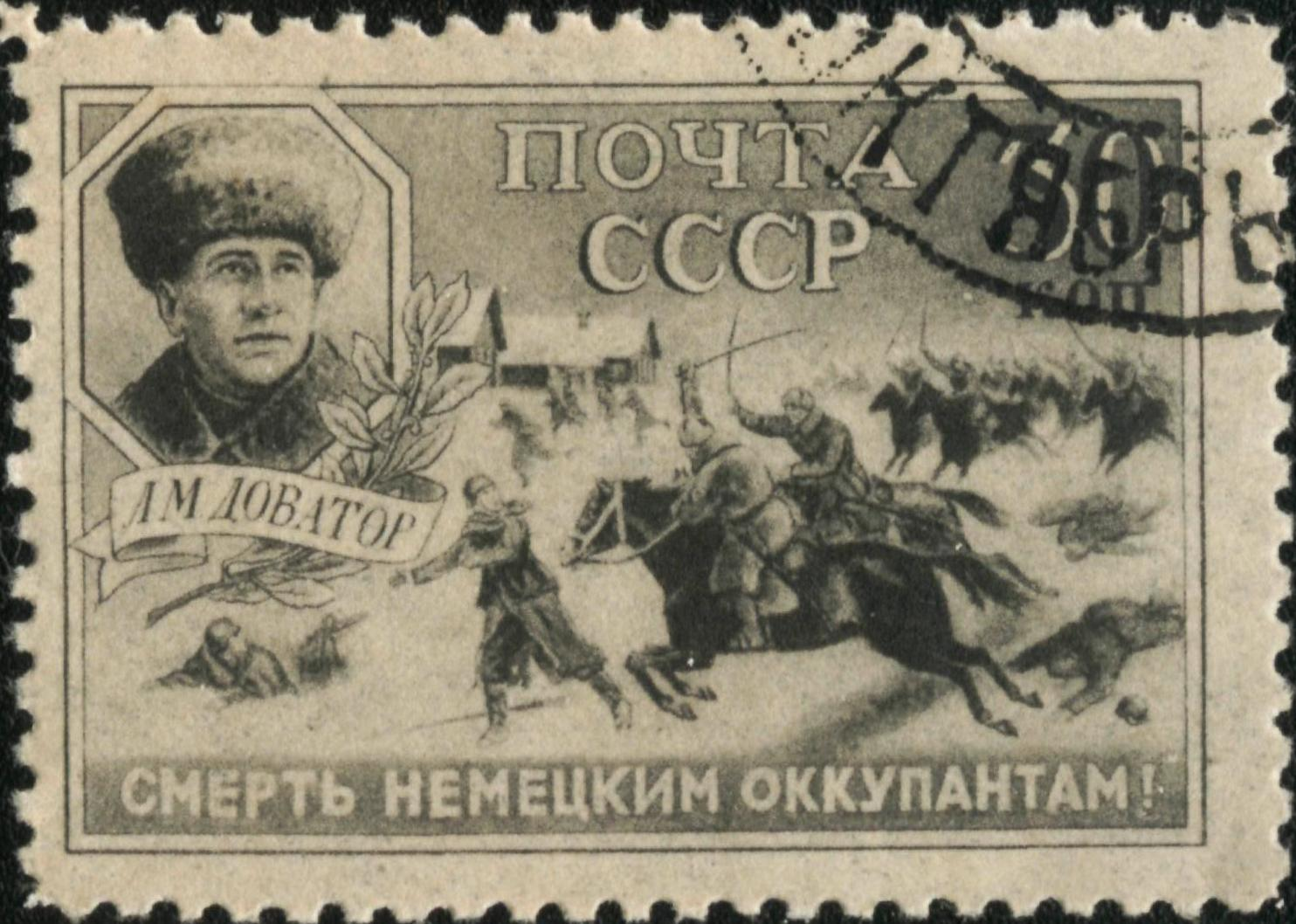
Lev Dovator (upper left) on the Soviet stamp published during the war. The text says "Death to German invaders!"

Despite the defections that were taking place, the majority of the Cossacks remained loyal to the Red Army. In the earliest battles, particularly the encirclement of Belostok Cossack units such as the 94th Beloglisnky, 152nd Rostovsky and 48th Belorechensky regiments fought to their death.

In the opening phase of the war, during the German advance towards Moscow, Cossacks became extensively used for the raids behind enemy lines. The most famous of these took place during the Battle of Smolensk under the command of Lev Dovator, whose 3rd Cavalry Corps consisted of the 50th and 53rd Cavalry divisions from the Kuban and Terek Cossacks, which were mobilised from the Northern Caucasus. The raid, which in ten days covered 300 km, destroyed the hinterlands of the 9th German Army before successfully breaking out. Whilst units under the command of General Pavel Belov, the 2nd Cavalry Corps made from Don, Kuban and Stavropol Cossacks spearheaded the counter-attack onto the right flank of the 6th German Army delaying its advance towards Moscow.

The high professionalism that the Cossacks under Dovator and Belov (both generals would later be granted the title Hero of the Soviet Union and their units raised to a Guards (elite) status) ensured that many new units would be formed. In the end, if the Germans during the whole war only managed to form two Cossack Corps, the Red Army in 1942 already had 17. Many of the newly formed units were filled with ethnically Cossack volunteers. The Kuban Cossacks were allocated to the 10th, 12th and 13th Corps. However, the most famous Kuban Cossack unit would be the 17th Cossack Corps under the command of general Nikolay Kirichenko.

During one particular attack, Cossacks killed up to 1,800 enemy soldiers and officers, they took 300 prisoners, seized 18 artillery pieces and 25 mortars. The 5th and 9th Romanian Cavalry divisions fled in panic, and the 198th German Infantry division, carrying large losses, hastily departed to the left bank of the river Ei.

During the opening phase of the Battle of Stalingrad, when the Germans overran the Kuban, the majority of the Cossack population, long before the Germans began their agitation with Krasnov and Shkuro, became involved in Partisan activity. Raids onto the German positions from the Caucasus mountains became commonplace. After the German defeat at Stalingrad, the 4th Guards Kuban Cossack Corps, strengthened by tanks and artillery, broke through the German lines and liberated Mineralnye Vody, and Stavropol.

For the latter part of the war, although the Cossacks did prove especially useful in reconnaissance and rear guards, the war did show that the age of horse cavalry had come to an end. The famous 4th Guards Kuban Cossacks Cavalry Corps which took part in heavy fighting in the course of the liberation of Southern Ukraine and Romania was allowed to proudly march on the Red Square in the famous Moscow Victory Parade of 1945.

==== Collaborators in Wehrmacht and Waffen SS ====
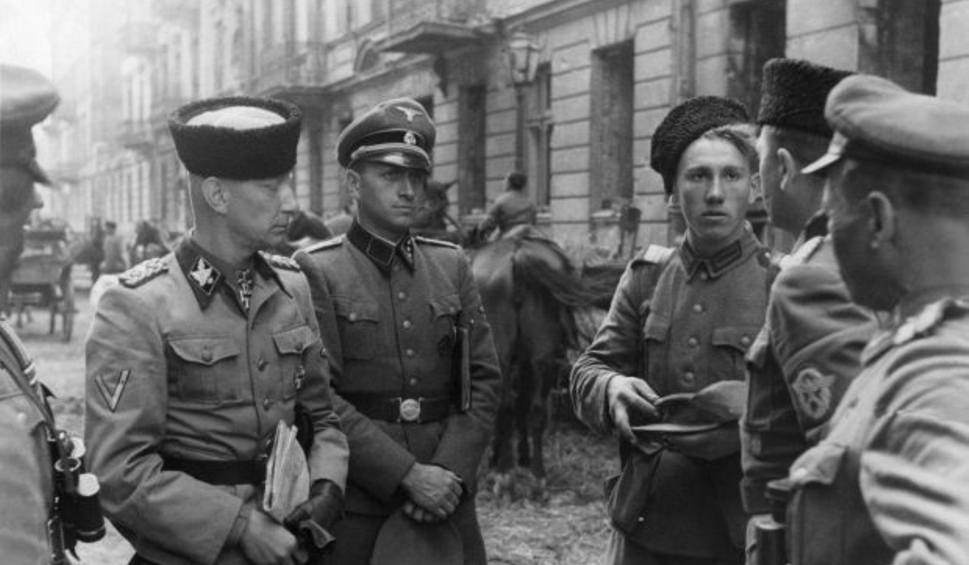
Waffen SS and the Regiment III of Cossacks during Warsaw Uprising. The regiment was composed of both Don and Kuban Cossacks

The first collaborators were formed from Soviet Cossack POWs and deserters after the consequences of the Red Army's early defeats in the course of Operation Barbarossa. During the Battle of the Caucasus in summer of 1942 some Soviet Kuban Cossacks chose to defect to Nazi service either when in POW camps or on active duty in the Soviet Army. For example, Major Kononov deserted on 22 August 1941 with an entire regiment and was instrumental in organizing Cossack volunteers in the Wehrmacht. Some Cossack emigres, such as Andrei Shkuro and Pyotr Krasnov chose to collaborate with the Nazis as well and stood at the helm of two Cossack divisions on Nazi service. However, most volunteers came after the Nazis reached the Cossack homelands in summer of 1942. The Cossack National Movement of Liberation was set up in hope of mobilizing opposition to the Soviet regime with an intent to rebuild an independent nationalist Cossack state.

While there were several smaller Cossack detachments in the Wehrmacht since 1941, the 1st Cossack Division made up of Don, Terek and Kuban Cossacks was formed in 1943. This division was further augmented by the 2nd Cossack Cavalry Division formed in December 1944. Both divisions participated in hostilities against Tito's partisans in Yugoslavia. In February 1945, both Cossack Divisions were transferred into the Waffen-SS and formed the XV SS Cossack Cavalry Corps. At the end of the war, the Cossack collaborators retreated from Italy (Kazachi Stan) and from Yugoslavia (XV SS Cossack Cavalry Corps) into Austria and surrendered to the British army. Under the Yalta agreement, they were forcibly repatriated with the rest of the collaborators to the Soviet authorities and some executed. One of the Kuban leaders, the ataman Vyacheslav Naumenko served as their principle historian after World War Two, writing the first Russian language book about the forced repatriation of Cossacks in his two volume work published in 1962 and 1970 entitled The Great Betrayal.

== Modern Kuban Cossacks ==
Flag of the Kuban Cossacks

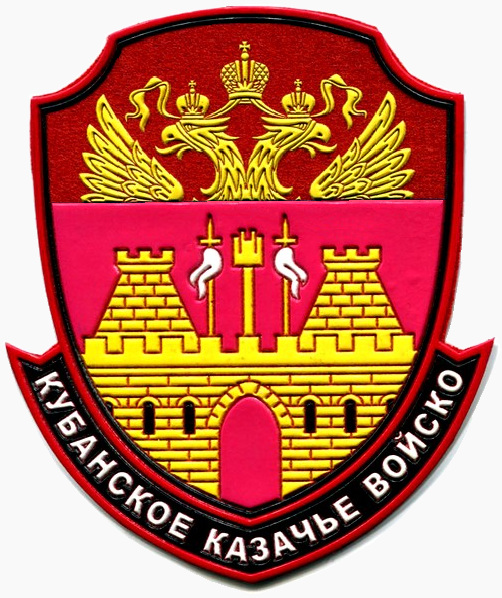
Emblem of registered Kuban cossacks

Following the war, the Cossack regiments, along with remaining cavalry were disbanded and removed from the Soviet armed forces as they were thought to be obsolete.

Starting in the late 1980s, there were renewed efforts to revive Cossack traditions which went to great lengths; in 1990, the Host was once again recognised by the Supreme Ataman of the All-Great Don Host (Всевеликое Войско Донское). At this time some pro-Ukrainian sentiment emerged among some Kuban Cossack leaders. For example, when in May 1993 Cossack leader Yevhen Nahai was arrested and accused of plotting a coup, another Cossack leader (kish otaman Pyuypenko) threatened to call for support for Ukraine if Nahai's rights were violated.

The Cossacks have actively participated in some of the more abrupt political developments following the dissolution of the Soviet Union: invasions of South Ossetia, Crimea, Transnistria and Abkhazia and nominally as peacekeepers in Kosovo. The latter conflict was in particular special for the Kuban Cossacks, initially a number of Cossacks fled from the de-Cossackization repressions of the 1920s and assimilated with the Abkhaz people. Before the Georgian-Abkhaz Conflict there was a strong movement of creating an Abkhaz-Kuban Host among the descendants. When the civil war broke out, 1500 Kuban Cossack volunteers from Russia came to aid the Abkhaz side. One of the notable groups was the 1st sotnia under the command of Ataman Nikolay Pusko which reportedly completely destroyed a Ukrainian volunteer group fighting on the Georgian side and then went on to be the first to enter Sukhumi in 1993. Since then, a detachment of Kuban Cossacks continue to inhabit Abkhazia, and their presence continues to influence the Georgian-Russian relations.

According to human rights reports from the 1990s, the Cossacks regularly harassed non-Russians, such as Armenians and Chechens, living in southern Russia.

Close to one thousand Kuban Cossacks joined Crimean "self-defence" units during the Annexation of Crimea by the Russian Federation in 2014. A contingent of Kuban Cossacks (led by Head of the All-Russian Cossack Society, Cossack General Nikolai Doluda) took part in the 2015 Moscow Victory Day Parade for the first time.

=== Present day military units ===
With the help of the governor of Krasnodar Krai, Aleksandr Tkachyov, the host has become an integral part of the Kuban life, there are joint combat training operations with the Russian Army, policing of the rural areas with the Police of Russia, and preparation of local youth for the one-year military conscription term. Not only is their aid in military affairs important, during the floods in 2004 of the Taman Peninsula they provided men and equipment for relief missions. Today, the host numbers 25 thousand men and has its own distinct forces: a whole regiment of the 7th "Cherkassy" Guards Air-Assault Division (the 108th "Kuban Cossack" Guards Airborne Regiment) in the Russian VDV; 205th Motorised Rifle Brigade, within the Southern Military District in the Russian Ground Forces, in addition to border guards.

On 2 August 2012, the governor of Krasnodar Krai, Alexander Tkachyov announced a controversial plan to deploy a paramilitary force of one thousand unarmed but uniformed Kuban Cossacks in the region to help police patrols. The cossacks were to be charged with preventing what he described as "illegal immigration" from the neighboring Caucasian republics.

The Kuban Cossacks has maintained a guard of honour since the mid 2000s. The formation of the guard of honor began in April 2006 by a group of Cossacks with the support of the Cossack chieftain, General Vladimir Gromov. On 12 June 2006, the guard performed for the first time at the Cossack monument in Krasnodar. Cossack Colonel Pyotr Petrenko has been in charge of this unit for 12 years. They wear the historical uniform of the His Majesty's Own Cossack Escort Regiment. After an increase in personnel took place, an equestrian group was formed. The requirements for members of the guard of honor include a lack of a criminal record and being more than 180 centimeters in height. During the Russo-Ukrainian War, numerous Russian Cossack volunteer units have been actively deployed to the front lines, with over 40,000 Cossacks rotating through the combat zone and approximately 19,000 serving on the front lines simultaneously. These formations, including the "Don", "Kuban", and "Terek" volunteer battalions, primarily operate within the BARS military reserve system and specialized assault corps.

== List of Atamans of the Kuban Cossack Host ==
· Nikolay Yevdokimov (1860–1861)

· Nikolay Ivanov (1861–1863)

· Felix Sumarokov-Elston (1863–1869)

· Mikhail Tsakni (1869–1873)

· Nikolay Karmalin (1873–1882)

· Sergey Sheremetev (1882–1884)

· Nikolay Leonov (1884–1892)

· Yakov Malama (1892–1904)

· Dmitry Odintsov (1904–1906)

· Nikolai Mikhailov (1906–1908)

· Mikhail Babich (1908–1917)

· Alexander Filimonov (1917–1919)

· Nikolai Uspensky (1919)

· Nikolai Bukretov (1920)

· Vasyl Ivanis (1920)

· Vyacheslav Naumenko (1920–1958)

· Vladimir Gromov (1990–2008)

· Nikolai Doluda (2008–2019)

· Nikolai Pervakov (2019–2020)

· Alexander Vlasov (2021–2025)

· Alexander Agibalov (2025–Present)

== Uniform and equipment ==
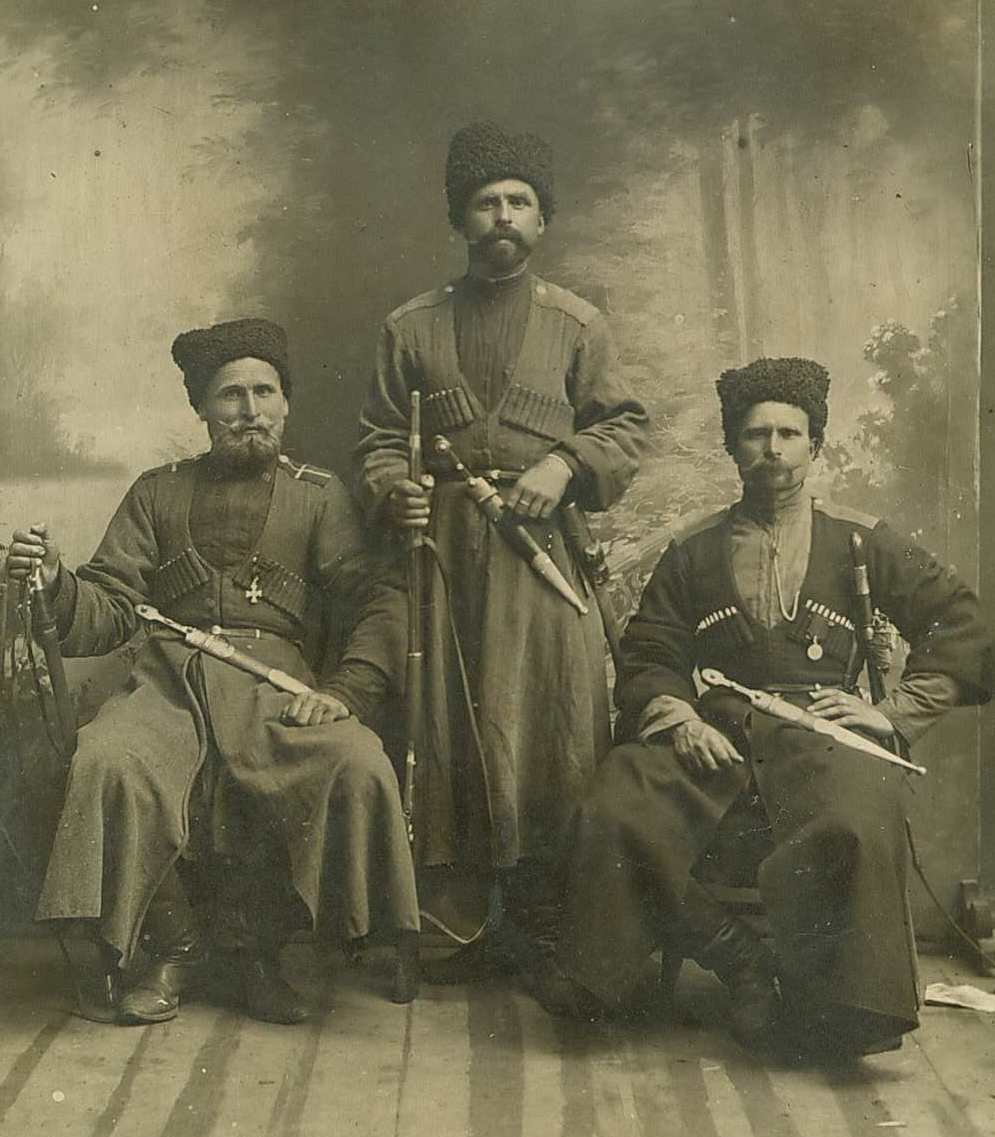
Kuban Cossacks in 1915.

Until 1914 the Kuban Cossack Host wore a full dress uniform comprising a dark grey/black kaftan (knee length collarless coat) with red shoulder straps and braiding on the wide cuffs. Ornamental containers (gaziri) which had originally contained single loading measures of gunpowder for muzzle-loading muskets, were worn on the breasts of the kaftans. The kaftan had an open front, showing a red waistcoat. Wide grey trousers were worn, tucked into soft leather boots without heels. Officers wore silver epaulettes, braiding and ferrules. This Caucasian national dress was also worn by the Terek Cossack Host but in different facing colors. Tall black fur hats were worn on all occasions with red cloth tops and (for officers) silver lace. A white metal scroll was worn on the front of the fur hat. A whip was used instead of spurs. Prior to 1908, individual cossacks from all Hosts were required to provide their own uniforms (together with horses, Caucasian saddles and harness). On active service during World War I the Kuban Cossacks retained their distinctive dress but with a black waistcoat replacing the conspicuous red one and without the silver ornaments or red facings of full dress. A black felt cloak (bourki) was worn in bad weather both in peace-time and on active service.

The 200 Kuban and 200 Terek Cossacks of the Imperial Escort (Konvoi) wore a special gala uniform; including a scarlet kaftan edged with yellow braid and a white waistcoat. Officers had silver braiding on their coats and epaulettes. A dark coloured kaftan was issued for ordinary duties together with a red waistcoat.

== Culture ==
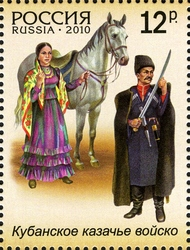
Kuban Cossacks on Russian post stamp

Because of the unique migration pattern of the Cossack's group, the Kuban Cossack identity has produced one of the most distinct cultures not only amongst other Cossacks but throughout the whole Eastern Slavic identity. The proximity to the Caucasus mountains and the Circassian people influenced the dress and uniform of the Cossacks — the distinctive cherkeska overcoat and the bashlyk scarf, local dance such as the Lezginka too came into the Kuban Cossack lifestyle. At the same time, the Cossacks continued much of their Don and Zaporozhian legacy, including a Kuban Bandura movement and the Kuban Cossack Choir which became one of the most famous in the world for their performance of Cossack and other folk songs and dances, performed in both the Russian and Ukrainian languages.

== Ethnocultural identity ==
The identity of the Kuban Cossacks is traditionally viewed as complex and multi-layered, shaped by their diverse historical origins and geographic location. It encompasses a unique blend of regional Cossack subculture, strong ties to Russian imperial and state identity, and significant linguistic influences from both Ukrainian (Zaporozhian) and Southern Russian heritages.

In the 1897 language-based census, 47.3% of the Kuban population (including the non-Cossack migrants from both the Great Russian and Little Russian governorates of the Russian Empire) referred to their vernacular as Little Russian, while 42.6% referred to theirs as Great Russian. In the major cities of the region, Great Russian predominantly constituted the majority of the population. According to the 1897 census, Great Russian speakers made up 52.9% of the inhabitants in the regional capital, Ekaterinodar (with Little Russian speakers at 38.3%), 72.8% in the major port city of Yeysk, and 61.3% in the administrative center of Maykop.

Between 1890 and 1910, the cultural landscape of the Kuban was dominated by the Russian language, which served as the primary medium for regional literature, theatrical productions, and the local press, including the prominent newspaper "Kubanskie Oblastnye Vedomosti". Politically, the region was integrated into the imperial system; during the 1905 Revolution, major political organizations established local branches. During the Russian Civil War, the pro-Ukrainian faction of the Kuban Rada attempted to align the Kuban People's Republic with the Ukrainian People's Republic, even voting for a resolution to join Ukraine on a federal basis in late 1918. During World War I, Austrian officials received reports from a Ukrainian organization of the Russian Empire that 700 Kuban Cossacks in eastern Galicia had been arrested by their Russian officers for refusing to fight against Ukrainians in the Austrian army. Russian remained the official language of administration. Federalist and autonomist aspirations caused intense friction with the leadership of the White Volunteer Army under General Denikin, culminating in a military coup in November 1919, during which the White movement forcibly dissolved the Rada and executed its pro-Ukrainian leaders.

After the Bolshevik Victory in the Russian Civil War, the Kuban was viewed as one of the most hostile regions to the young Communist state. In his 1923 speech devoted to the national and ethnic issues in the party and state affairs, Joseph Stalin identified several obstacles in implementing the national programme of the party. Those were the "dominant-nation chauvinism", "economic and cultural inequality" of the nationalities and the "remnants of nationalism among a number of nations which have borne the heavy yoke of national oppression". For the Kuban, this was met with a unique approach. The victim/minority became the non-Cossack peasants who, like their counterparts in New Russia. To counter "dominant-nation chauvinism" a policy of Ukrainization/Korenization was introduced. According to the 1926 census, there were nearly a million Ukrainians registered in the Kuban Okrug (or 62% of the total population).

Additionally, more than 700 schools with Ukrainian as the language of instruction were opened, and the Kuban Pedagogical Institute had its own Ukrainian department. Numerous Ukrainian-language newspapers such as Chornomorets and Kubanska Zoria were published. According to historian A.L. Pawliczko, there was an attempt to have a referendum on the joining of Kuban to the Ukrainian SSR. In 1930, the Ukrainian Minister ("People’s Komissar") Mykola Skrypnyk, involved in solving national issues in the Ukrainian SSR, put forward an official proposal to Joseph Stalin that the territories of Voronezh, Kursk, Chornomoriya, Azov, Kuban regions be administered by the government of the Ukrainian SSR.

By the end of 1932, the Ukrainization programme was reversed. By the late 1930s, number of Ukrainians in the Kuban had declined. In the 1939 census, Russians in the Kuban region were a majority, numbering 2,754,027 or 86% of the population. The 2nd edition of the Great Soviet Encyclopedia explicitly named the Kuban Cossacks as Russians.

According to modern sociolinguistic assessments and census data, the language of daily communication, education, and administration across present-day Krasnodar Krai is Contemporary Standard Russian. One of the historical Kuban vernacular, known as balachka, is an East Slavic contact speech that developed from the historical blending of the Southern Russian and Zaporozhian Ukrainian. Over time, systemic literacy and state educational transformed Balachka into a regional vernacular primarily spoken by a population with a predominant Russian identity. Balachka blended with Don Cossack Gutor, a local Southern Russian dialect which incorporated distinct military archaic loanwords. Some regions the vernacular includes Northern Caucasus words and accents. The influence of Russian grammatical forms is also apparent.

In the 2002 Russian census, the Cossacks were viewed as a socio-cultural and military group within the Russian population. The Kuban Cossacks living in Krasnodar Kray, Adygea, Karachayevo-Cherkessia and some regions of Stavropol Krai and Kabardino-Balkaria counted 25,000 men. However, the strict governance of the census meant that only Cossacks who are in active service were treated as such, and at the same time, 300,000 families are registered by the Kuban Cossack Host.

All Russia	145,166,731	140,028
Republic	Total population	Cossacks
Adygea	447,109	470
Kabardino-Balkaria	901,494	307
Karachayevo-Cherkessia	439,470	2,501
Krasnodar Krai	5,125,221	17,542
Stavropol Krai	2,231,759	3,902
Total in Kuban	9,145,053	24,722

== Genetic profile ==
Modern genetic studies indicate that the Kuban Cossacks form an integral part of the East Slavic genetic continuum, tightly clustering with neighboring Russian populations. Genetic analysis demonstrates a high degree of patrilineal proximity between the Kuban Cossacks, the Don Cossacks, and the broader Russian gene pool. The dominant paternal haplogroup among the Kuban Cossacks is R1a, followed by other European lineages such as I2 and I1. Despite their long-term settlement along the North Caucasus borders and close interactions with local Caucasian mountain tribes, the paternal gene pool of the Kuban Cossacks features minimal native Caucasus or East Asian genetic components. This reveals that the internal demographic expansion relied almost entirely on continuous migration waves of male settlers from internal Russian governorates rather than the genetic assimilation of the local autochthonous populations. Their autosomal profile mirrors the average genetic composition found in central and southern Russian populations (such as those from Kursk, Voronezh, and Ryazan oblasts).

== Organisation ==
=== Early 20th century ===
Within the Empire, the Kuban land was administered through the Kuban Oblast with a semi-military administration. It was composed of seven subdivisions (otdels), and numbered 1.3 million people (278 stanitsas and 32 khutors). Kuban Cossacks formed regular units of the Imperial Russian Army as listed below. The following lists the structure prior to the outbreak of World War I, although this was re-organised during the conflict (see foot-note).

In peacetime the Host provided 10 horse regiments making up a Kuban Cossack division, six plastun (infantry) battalions and six horse-artillery batteries; in addition to irregular and support units. The "first" regiments were linked to the specific locales that they were recruited from, although they would often be deployed elsewhere in the Empire. In wartime, recruits were drafted from each region to form "second" regiments during the stage of initial mobilization. If further manpower was required, a "third" regiment would be formed to be dispatched as reinforcements. During World War One a total of 37 horse (cavalry) regiments were raised by the Kuban Cossack Host.

A 1916 map of Kuban Oblast with the neighboring Black Sea Governorate and part of Sukhumi Okrug (in Russian)

Regiments:

- 1st and 2nd Kuban Life Guard sotnias of His Imperial Majesty's personal convoy (a special unit of the Imperial Guard acting for personal protection of the monarch)
- 1st Khopyor regiment "Her Imperial Highness Grand Duchess Anastasia Mikhailovna"
- 1st Kuban regiment "General Field Marshal Grand Duke Michael Nikolaevich"
- 1st Zaporozhian regiment "Empress Catherine the Great"
- 1st Yekaterinodar regiment "Kosh Ataman Chepiga"
- 1st Poltavskaya regiment "Yekatrinoslav Viceroy General Field Marshal Prince Potyomkin-Tavrichesky"
- 1st Umanskaya regiment "Brigadier Golovaty"
- 1st Taman regiment "General Bezkrovny"
- 1st Laba regiment "General Zass"
- 1st Line regiment "General Velyaminov"
- 1st Black Sea regiment "Colonel Bursak"

Divisions:

- Kuban Cossack Division (after the outbreak of World War I, the Russian Army began reforming this system along modern lines, but only one division was in existence in 1914)

Plastuns:

- 1st Kuban plastun battalion "General Field Marshal Grand Duke Michael Nikolaevich"
- 2nd through 6th Kuban plastun battalions

As noted the plastun units served as infantry. On mobilization an additional six battalions (numbered 7th through 12th) were added to the peacetime establishment, and a further two (13th and 14th) raised as reserve units. The effectiveness of these units was demonstrated during the war, particularly the Caucasus Front and by 1917 a total of 22 battalions, comprising one division plus four brigades, were on active service. A further three battalions were in reserve.

Horse artillery:

- 1st Kuban Cossack battery "General Field Marshal Grand Duke Michael Nikolaevich"
- 2nd through 5th Kuban Cossack batteries.

In addition there four commands that were responsible for support and home front organisation in the Kuban (supplies, hospitals etc.): Ust-Labinskaya, Armavirskaya, Labinskaya and Batalpashinskaya.

From 1914 to 1917 the Kuban Cossack Host committed a total of 89 thousand men to the Russian war effort. These included 37 horse regiments, a cavalry division, 2 mounted regiments recruited from mountain peoples (Adyghe and Karachay), six convoy (Imperial Guard) escort half-sotnias, two Leib Guard HIH personal sotnias, 4 infantry plastun brigades (22 battalions), a special plastun division, nine horse artillery batteries, four reserve horse regiments and three reserve plastun battalions.

== See also ==
- Auxiliaries
- Cossacks
  - Azov Cossack Host
  - Black Sea Cossacks
  - Caucasus Line Cossack Host
  - Danubian Sich
  - Don Cossacks
  - Zaporozhian Cossacks
- Decossackization
- Kuban Cossack culture
  - Balachka
  - Kuban bandurists
  - Kuban Cossack Choir
  - Cossacks of the Kuban – a color musical film
- Ukrainians in the Kuban
  - Felix Sumarokov-Elston
