= Antin =

Antin may refer to:

== Places ==
- Antin, Hautes-Pyrénées, a commune in the Hautes-Pyrénées department in France
- Antin, Croatia, a village in eastern Croatia

== People ==
=== Surname ===
- Benjamin Antin (1884–1956), New York politician
- Eleanor Antin (born 1935), American artist and writer
- Manuel Antín (1926–2024), Argentine film director and screenwriter.
- Mary Antin (1881–1949), American author and activist

=== Given name ===
Ukrainian form of Anton (given name)

- Antin Angelovych, Ukrainian cleric
- Antin Holovaty, Ukrainian Cossack leader
- Antin Paplynsky, Ukrainian bandura maker
- Antin Sielava, Ukrainian cleric

== Companies ==
- Antin Infrastructure Partners, private equity firm
