= Balachka =

Dialect of Ukrainian

- Native to: Russia (Krasnodar Krai, Rostov Oblast)
- Ethnicity: Kuban Cossacks
- Language family: Indo-European: Balto-Slavic; Slavic; East Slavic; Balachka
- Early forms: Proto-Indo-European: Proto-Balto-Slavic; Proto-Slavic; Old East Slavic; Ruthenian; Eastern dialect (Old Ukrainian)

Language codes
- ISO 639-3: –
- Glottolog: None

Balachka (Russian: бала́чка, romanized: baláčka; Ukrainian: бала́чка, romanized: baláčka) is the traditional variety spoken by the Kuban Cossacks. It is spoken in the Kuban region of southern Russia, particularly in present-day Krasnodar Krai. It developed among the Black Sea Cossacks who were resettled to the region in the late 18th century from territories of the former Zaporizhian Sich.

Balachka is an East Slavic language spoken in southern Russia which has significant Ukrainian influence. Its phonetics, vocabulary and certain grammatical features reflect a mixture of southern Russian dialectal forms and elements associated with central and eastern Ukrainian speech.

Historically, Balachka functioned as the everyday spoken language of Kuban Cossack stanitsas. It was used for day to day communications, oral traditions, folk songs, proverbs and local storytelling.

In the 20th century, De-Cossackization and Soviet language policy led to the predominance of Standard Russian language in education, administration and media. As a result, Balachka declined in everyday usage although it still remains in use in rural areas and in the preservation of Kuban Cossack cultural heritage.

== History ==
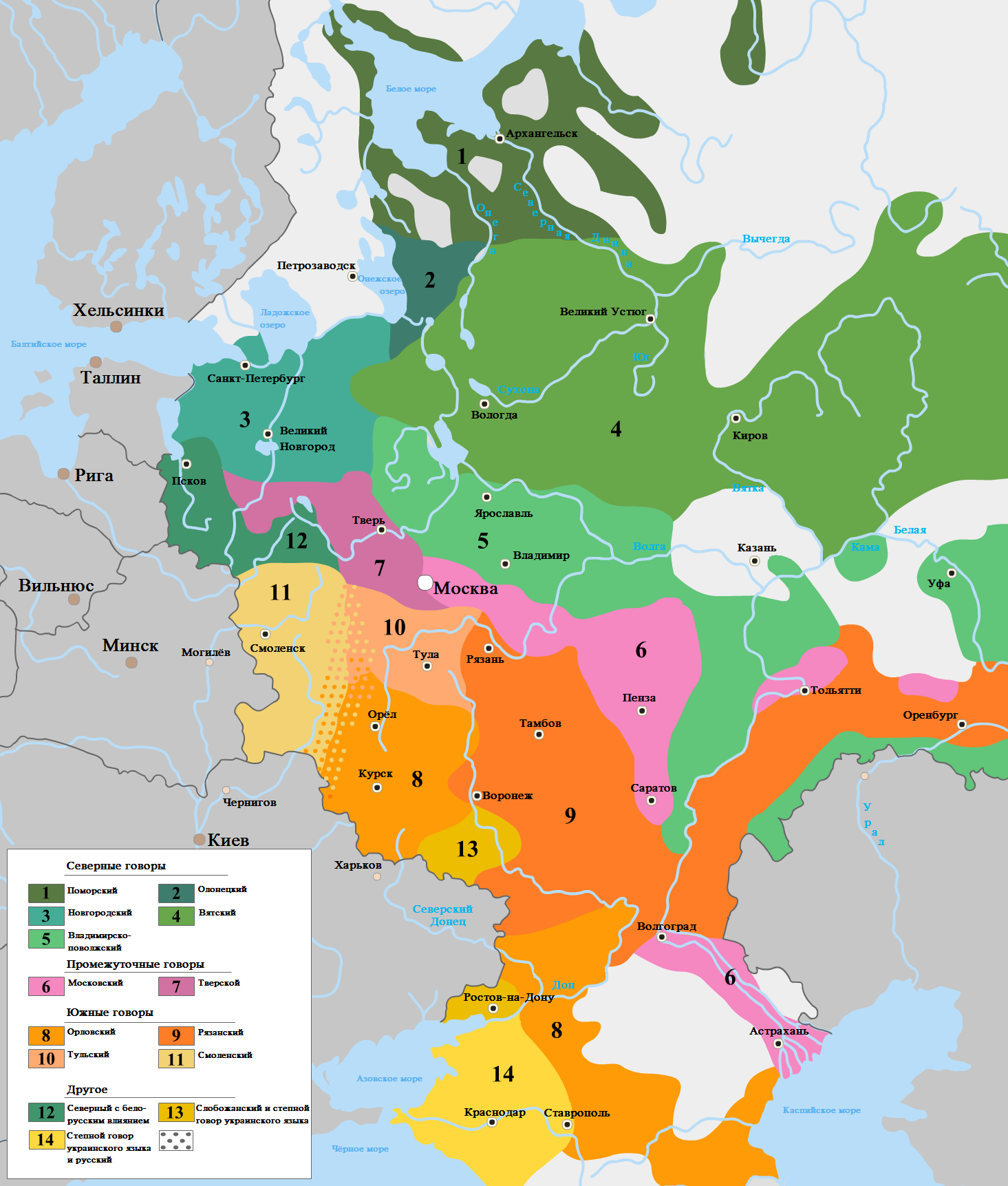
Areas of Russia where Balachka is commonly spoken are marked with No.14 on the map

The most significant instance of the dialect is in the Kuban region with the language being spoken by the Black Sea Cossacks who moved to there in 1792.

The Kuban Cossack Chorus artistic director Viktor Zakharchenko points to the local folk songs dating to early and mid-19th century, where those that originated in the Kuban would have their own unique literary flavour and differ from those in standard Russian and Ukrainian.

During the 1897 Russian census it was classified as a dialect of Little Russian (the Imperial-era Russian name for Ukrainian) language rather than Great Russian (Russian).

In modern times the everyday usage of Balachka is declining.

== Usage ==
=== Public usage ===
It is not known how widespread the use of Balachka is. Education and strict requirements of the Russian Academy of Sciences mean that local press such as TV and radio adhere to standard Russian, with a notable exception for historical films (particularly those involving Cossacks) and Folk music groups and ensembles, such as the Kuban Cossack Chorus.

As a result, there has been a gradual erosion in the use of authentic dialects and accents, with unique terms being slowly replaced by standard Russian ones. This is particularly noticeable in the younger generations. At the same time, beginning in the early 1990s, the re-awakening of the Cossacks movement was often done with rekindling of old traditions. It is thus not surprising that many Cossacks use Balachka (or some of its elements) in their speech to punctuate their Cossack heritage and/or affiliation.

As of 2010 the everyday usage of Balachka is declining. Some attempts are being made by local communities to preserve the dialect. It was proposed to teach Balachka in the schools and universities of Krasnodar Krai by students and teachers of Kuban State University. This attempts found no support from the federal administration.

=== Political aspects ===
Political aspects have played a direct role in the classification of the Kuban Balachka. Although this Balachka was initially officially classified as a dialect of the Little Russian language (the official term in pre-revolutionary Russia for the Ukrainian language), and some Ukrainian sources actively support the idea of Balachka being a dialect of the Ukrainian language, this is being contested by some Russian linguistic research, and some of the Kuban Cossacks themselves, who point out that already by the 1860s there was a separate dialect that morphed out of Ukrainian and Russian.

== Varieties ==
There 3 varieties of Balachka: Kuban, Don and Mountainous subdialects. The most widespread variety is Kuban subdialect which was originally used by the Cossacks of Black Sea Host.

== Examples ==
Examples of Balachka written in accordance to Russian and Ukrainian orthographies with translation in English.

Russian orthography	Ukrainian orthography	Translation
А грэць його зна! У нас в станыци на нэй кажэ багато людэй, хоч потрошкы йийи и забувають. Ось и я вжэ нэ вмию дужэ швыдко балакать, так, дви-тры фразы кажу, нэ бильш, писля на русскый пэрэстрыбую, бо и в Краснодари дужэ довго вчився, а колы в станыцю вэрнувся, багато позабував.	А грець його зна! У нас в станиці на ней каже багато людей, хоч потрошки її і забувають. Ось і я вже не вмію дуже швидко балакать, так, дві-три фрази кажу, не більш, після на русский перестрибую, бо і в Краснодарі дуже довго вчився, а коли в станицю вернувся, багато позабував.	Who knows! In our village, many people speak it, although they forget it little by little. And I can't chat very fast anymore too, like, I say two or three phrases, no more, then I jump to Russian, because I studied in Krasnodar for a long time, and when I returned to the village, I forgot a lot.
И звидкиля ты узявся такий, Степан Хуторской? Так складно балакаешь, такий сичный гумор в тебе, ну, чесне слово, прямо завидки беруть. Всэ у тебе е: и думкы, и смишинки, и сльозинки, и видвага, и гострый, як бритва, язык - отразу выдно, природный ты козак, добрый козак! По нраву ты, Степа, простым людям, и, звычайно, мэни, старому бандурысту. Разом даже лякаюсь: нэ пэрэплюнув бы мэне своимы бувальшинамы. Порой скыдаеся ты на нашего Олександра Пивня, на Козьму Пруткова, на других щирых гумористов, але, по правде сказать, свий у тебэ и голос, и обличче. Твори, любый! Нашим з тобою землякам Слово твое нынче, может, потрибнийше и важливийше самых живительных лекарств.	І звідкіля ти узявся такий, Стєпан Хуторской? Так складно балакаєш, такий січний гумор в тебе, ну чесне слово, прямо завидки беруть. Все у тебе є: і думки, і смішинки, і сльозинки, і відвага, і гострий, як бритва, язик - отразу видно, природний ти козак, добрий козак! По нраву ти, Стьопа, простим людям, і, звичайно, мені, старому бандуристу. Разом даже лякаюся: не переплюнув би мене своїми бувальшинами. Порой скидаєся ти на нашего Олександра Півня, на Козьму Пруткова, на других щирих гумористов, але, по правдє сказать, свій у тебе і голос, і обличче. Творі, любий! Нашим з тобою зємлякам Слово твоє нинчє, может, потрібнійше і важлівійше самих жівітєльних лєкарств.	And where did you came from, Stepan Khutorskoy? You talk so complexly, you have such a juicy sense of humor, well, honestly, I'm envious. You have everything: thoughts, jokes, tears, courage, and a tongue as sharp as a razor - it is immediately obvious that you are a natural Cossack, a good Cossack! Simple people like you, Styopa, and, of course, me, an old bandurist. Sometimes I'm even scared: would you outbid me with the adventures of yours. Sometimes you look like our Oleksandr Piven, Kozma Prutkov, other sincere humorists, but, to tell the truth, you have your own voice and face. Create, dear! To our compatriots, your Word is perhaps more needed and more important than the most healing medicines themselves.

The latter text is written by Ivan Varavva. The same text in standard Ukrainian and Russian:

Standard Ukrainian	Standard Russian
І звідкіля ти взявся такий, Степане Хутірський? Так складно балакаєш, такий соковитий гумор у тебе, ну, чесне слово, аж заздрощі беруть. Все у тебе є: і думки, і смішинки, і сльозинки, і відвага, і гострий, як бритва, язик — одразу видно, природжений ти козак, добрий козак! До вподоби ти, Степане, простим людям і, звичайно, мені, старому бандуристові. Часом навіть лякаюсь: не переплюнув би мене своїми бувальщинами. Часом скидаєшся ти на нашого Олександра Півня, на Кузьму Пруткова, на інших щирих гумористів, але, правду кажучи, свій у тебе і голос, і обличчя. Твори, любий! Нашим з тобою землякам Слово твоє нині, може, потрібніше та важливіше за найживильніші ліки.	И откуда ты взялся такой, Степан Хуторской? Так складно говоришь, такой сочный юмор у тебя, ну, честное слово, прямо завидно делается. Всё у тебя есть: и мысли, и смешки, и слёзки, и отвага, и острый, как бритва, язык — сразу видно, прирождённый ты казак, хороший казак! По нраву ты, Стёпа, простым людям, и, конечно, мне, старому бандуристу. Порой даже пугаюсь: не переплюнул бы меня своими бывальщинами. Порой смахиваешь ты на нашего Александра Пивня, на Козьму Пруткова, на других прирождённых юмористов, но, говоря откровенно, свои у тебя и голос, и лицо. Твори, дорогой! Нашим с тобою землякам Слово твоё нынче, может, нужнее и важнее самых живительных лекарств.

== Known speakers ==
- Aslan Tkhakushinov — Circassian public figure, former head (2007–2017) of Adyghea, worked on the repatriation program for Circassian people to return from the forced exile.
- Mykola Riabovil — Ukrainian political figure, chairman of the Kuban Legislative Council (1918) and the chairman of the Kuban Military Council (1919).
- Vasyl Mova — Ukrainian writer and poet from Krasnodar Krai, a member of Hromada, Ukrainian national movement and left-wing secret society.
- Yakiv Kukharenko — appointed otaman (leader) of Azov Cossack Host (1851–1852) and Black Sea Cossack Host (1852–1856), Kuban literature classic, a friend of Taras Shevchenko.
- Yulia Yurina — Ukrainian singer and public figure, hailing from the resort town of Anapa.

== See also ==
- Bałak, the use of Ukrainian and Jewish words on a Polish grammar matrix.
- Surzhyk, the use of Russian words on a Ukrainian grammar matrix.
- Diglossia, a situation of parallel usage of two closely related languages, one of which is generally used by the government and in formal texts, and the other one is usually the spoken informally
- Don group of Russian subdialects
