= Rostov-on-Don Hippodrome =

Horse racing track in Rostov-on-Don, Russia

Coordinates: 47.2363°N 39.7235°E

Rostov-on-Don Hippodrome (Russian: Ростовский ипподром) is a horse racing track in the city of Rostov-on-Don, Russia. It is one of the oldest hippodromes in Southern Russia.

== History ==
At the end of the 19th and beginning of the 20th century, horse breeding in Don Host Oblast was developing at a rapid pace, with both local Cossacks and private entrepreneurs were engaged at. The latter were also subsidized by the state. In the middle of 1880, in Zadonye there were 86-89 stud farms, and by 1900 their number had reached 145 with a total horse population of 83 thousand. Approximately during the same years, horse racing societies were established in Novocherkassk and Nakhichevan-on-Don. Amateur trotting races became a popular entertainment for locals. In Rostov-on-Don the racecourse was opened in 1902.

Under the Soviet regime, all private stud farms, as well as all cossack herds, were liquidated due to the policy of decossackization. The soon-to-come 1921-22 famine also contributed to the worsening of the situation: horse-breeding almost ceased to exist.

Yet right after the end of the 1917-23 Civil War, the authorities tried to improve the situation. For example, in November 1920 in Rostov-on-Don, the Office of Horse Breeding and Horse Breeding was established, and new stud farms were organized on those lands where there used to be private ones. Nevertheless, the situation remained extremely difficult: on the Don in 1923 there were only 2,000 valuable mares. The recovery of the industry took place with great hardship. With the gradual revival of horse breeding in the 1920s–1930s, Rostov Hippodrome was also reopened in 1925.

But already in 1952 by the decision of the authorities many horse farms were liquidated, and some of the horses were killed. In Rostov Oblast, out of 22 stud farms, only five were left, and out of 132 breeding farms, only three were left. These actions again caused great material and moral damage to the industry.

In 2002, on the eve of its 100th anniversary, Rostov Hippodrome ceased to be a state-owned enterprise. Currently it belongs to AgroSoyuz Yug Rusi LLC, thus becoming the first private racing track in modern Russia.

== Current state ==
When the hippodrome was privatized, the racetrack was re-equipped. Now it has 14 stables, including two two-story ones. The territory of the field occupies 28 hectares. There are two tracks ― for training and for races. The cover is ground and sand. There are also a forge, a veterinary hospital, an ammunition depot, and a granary.
