= Pavlo Holovaty =

Pavlo Andriyovych Holovaty (Ukrainian: Павло Андрійович Головатий; 1715–1795) was a Ukrainian military figure, a Kosh Otoman of the Zaporozhian Sich and last military judge of the Zaporozhian Cossack Host. He is often confused with his younger brother, the leader of the Zaporozahian Host's successor the Black Sea Cossack Host Antin Holovaty.

== Biography ==
Pavlo Holovaty was born in Kiev and educated together with his younger brother at the Kyiv-Mohyla Academy.

With the destruction of the Zaporozhian Sich in 1775, many of the more senior Cossacks were repressed by the Russian government. Pavlo was one of those arrested with the last Zaporozhian koshovy Petro Kalnyshevsky. Both Holovaty and Kalnyshevsky spent a year incarcerated in Moscow, and were given death sentences which were later commuted to lifetime incarceration.

He was sent to Toblosk and incarcerated at the Znamensky monastery until his death.

== Sources ==
- (In Ukrainian) H. Kvitka-Osnovianenko - Holovatyi in: Zaporozhtsi. Istoriyi Kozatskoyi kultury Kyiv, 1993. p.`130-140
- A. Kaschenko - Opovidannia pro Slavne vijsko zaporoz'ke nyzove - Kyiv, 1992. (The story about the Glory of the army of lower Zaporizhzhia)
- Encyclopedia of the Ukrainian Cossacks - Published by the Zaporizhia State University
- Encyclopedia of the Ukrainian Cossacks - Kyiv, 2006,

== See also ==
- Zaporozhian Host
- Zaporizhian Sich
- History of the Cossacks
