= Zakhary Chepiha =

Ukrainian kish otaman

Personal details
- Born: 1725 Bortki, Chernihiv Oblast
- Died: 14 January 1797 Yekaterinodar

Zakhary (Kharyton or Kharko) Oleksiyovych Chepiha (Ukrainian: Захарій (Харитон / Харко) Олексійович Чепіга), sometimes transliterated Chepiga, alternative surname: Kulish (Ukrainian: Куліш) (1725 – 14 January 1797) was, after Sydir Bily, the second Kosh ataman of the Black Sea Cossack Host.

Chepiha was born in Chernihiv Oblast. He arrived at the Zaporozhian Sich in 1740 and at its demise in 1775 was a Cossack polkovnyk. He retired with the title of Captain. In 1783 he made an unsuccessful attempt at organizing a cohort of volunteer cossacks from the Zaporozhia.

After meeting up with Catherine II in 1787, he was one of the cossacks to convince the Empress in allowing the formation of the Host of the Loyal Zaporozhians, later known as the Black Sea Cossack Host.

Soon afterwards the Russo-Turkish War (1787–1792) broke out, and the new cossack host received its battle christening on the Southern Bug river during the Battle of Ochakov.

During a campaign in 1788, Chepiha was wounded by a bullet to the shoulder. After Sydor Bily's death, he was proclaimed the Host's ataman. He took part in the storming of Izmail in 1790 and the battle of Babodah in 1791. For his efforts, Chepiha received the rank of the Order of St. George. In 1792 he took part in the resettlement of the Black Sea Cossacks to the Kuban. He died in 1797 and was buried in Yekaterinodar.

Preceded by Sidor Belyi	Ataman of the Black Sea Cossacks; 1788–1797	Succeeded by Antin Holovaty
