= Kuban Cossack Choir =

Folk music ensemble from Russia

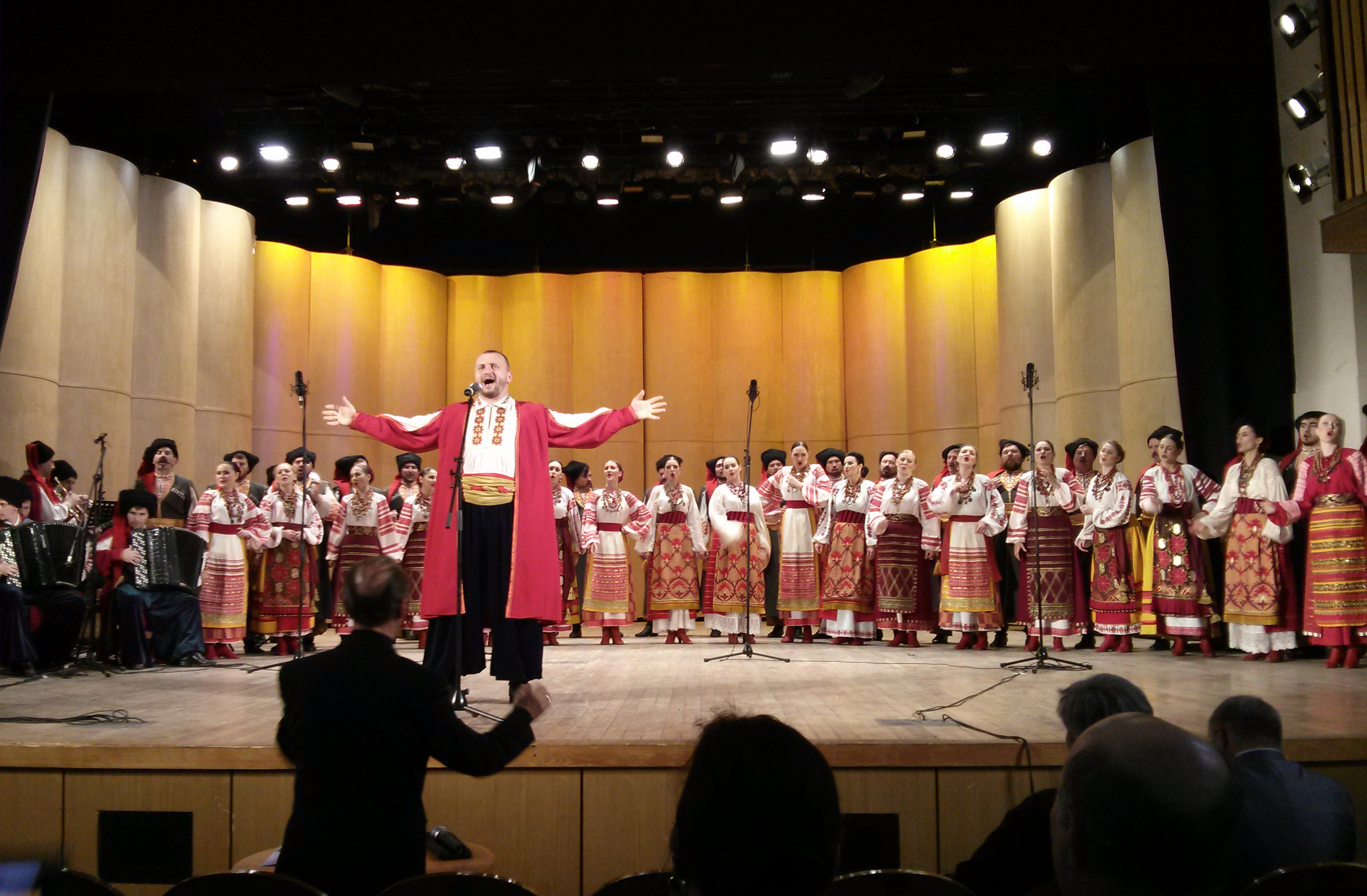
Kuban Cossack Choir performing at Gnessin Russian Academy of Music, 2013

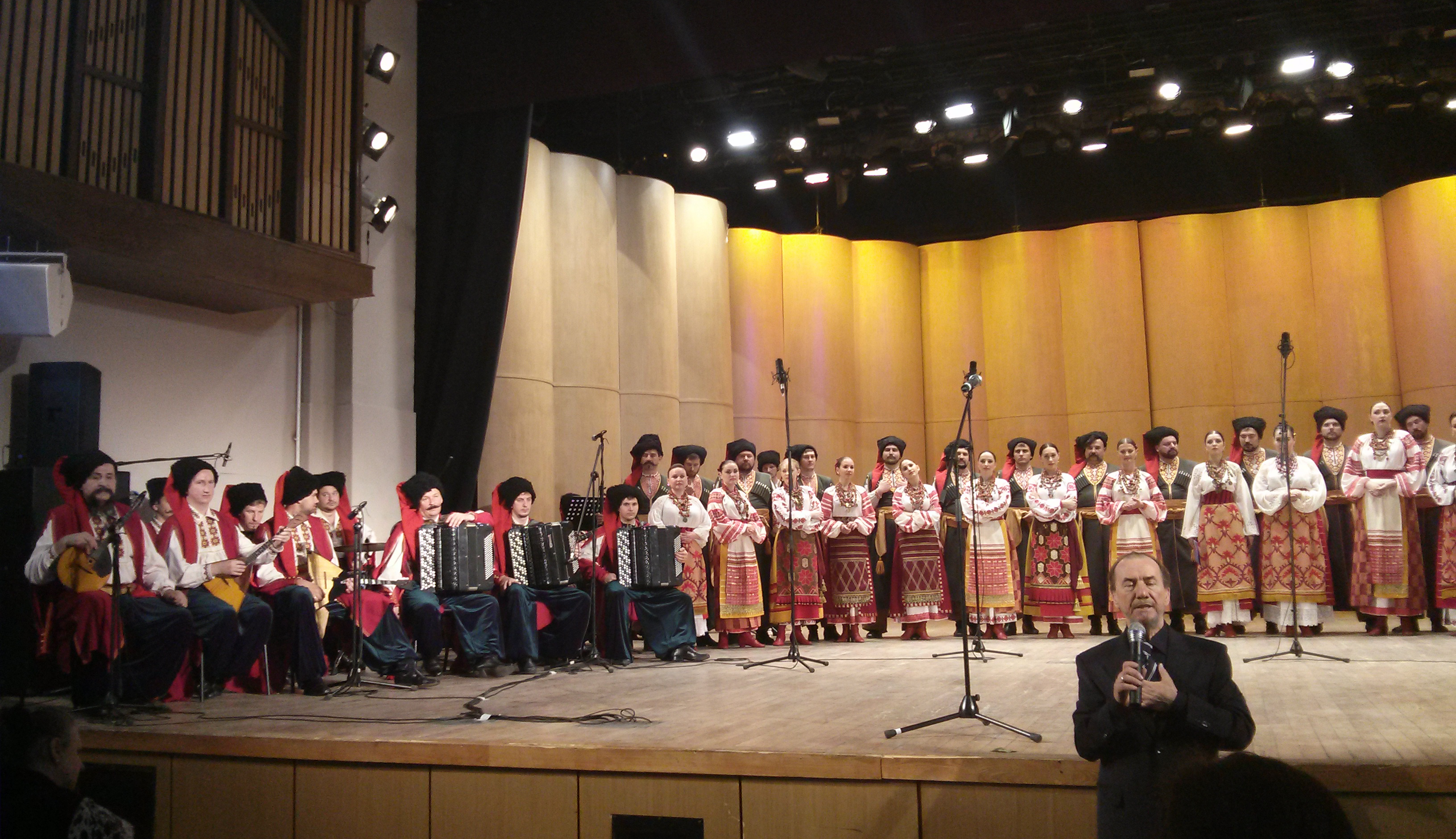
Kuban Cossack Choir at Gnessin Academy with Viktor Zakharchenko in front, 2013

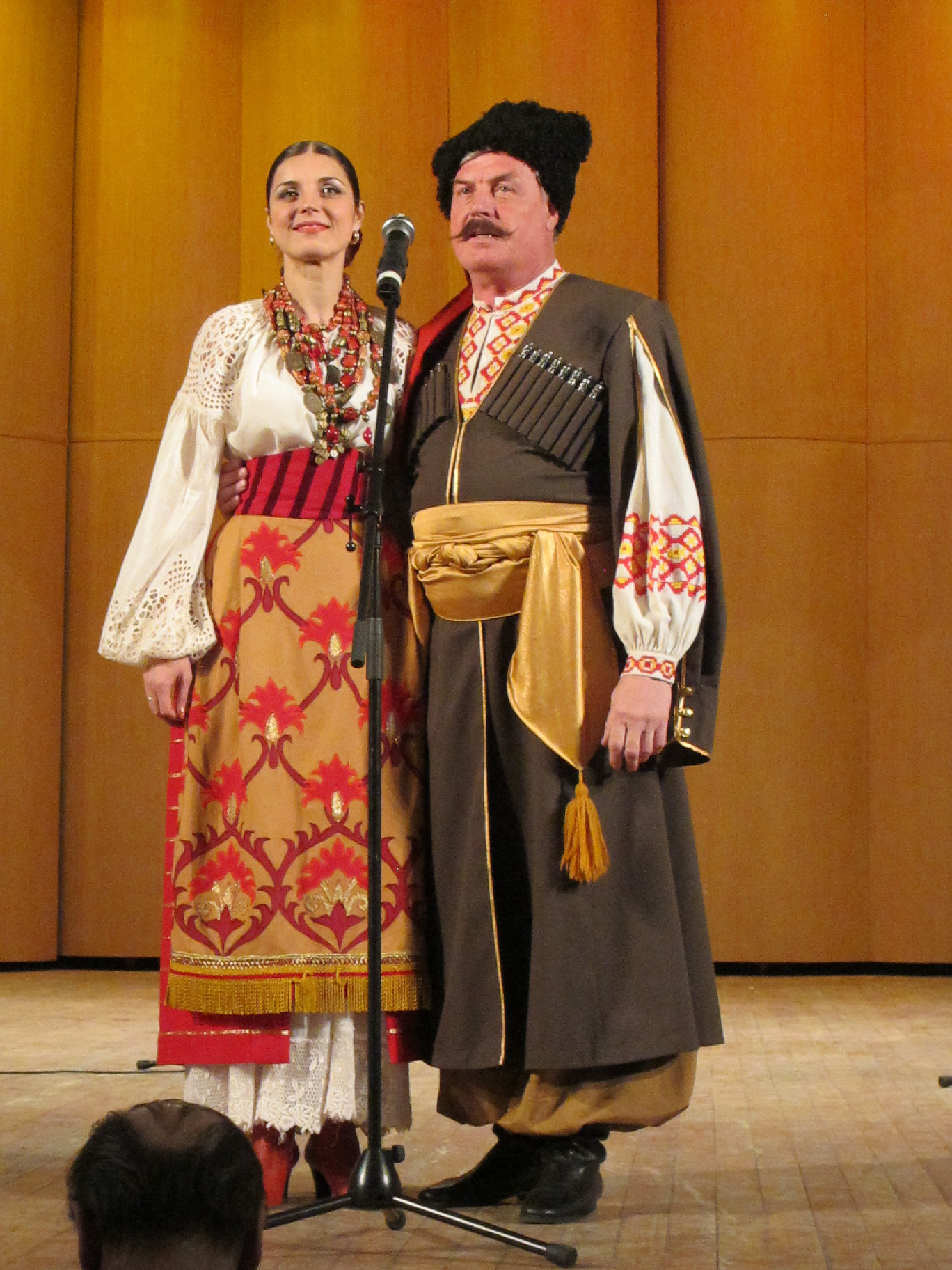
Traditional dresses

Kuban Cossack Chorus (Russian: Кубанский казачий хор, romanized: Kubanskij kazačij chor, Ukrainian: Кубанський козачий хор, romanized: Kubanśkyj kozačyj chor) is one of the leading folkloric ensembles in Russia. Its repertoire and performances reflect the songs, dances, and folklore of the Kuban Cossacks.

== History ==
=== Early years ===
The modern Kuban Cossack Chorus sets the date of its creation as 14 October 1811, when its predecessor, the Black Sea Host Singing Chorus (Черноморский Войсковый певческий хор, Černomorskij Vojskovyj pevčeskij xor), was formed. The founders of this choir were Kiril Rossinsky and regent Grigory Grechinsky. Over the next hundred years in addition to singing the Russian Orthodox Liturgy in Slavonic, the choir regularly gave public concerts throughout the Krasnodar Krai. The concerts included classical works as well as folk songs in addition to sacred works.

=== Soviet Union ===
In the summer of 1921, under the Decossackization programme of the Bolshevik authorities, the Cossack Host was dissolved, being revived only in 1936. The choir was then headed by Grigory Kontsevich and Yakov Taranko, formally regents of the old Kuban Chorus.

In 1937 during the Purges, Kontsevich was arrested and then executed. The choir however continued to grow, and in 1939 with the addition of a dance group it was renamed the Ensemble of Kuban Cossack Dance (Ансамбль песни и пляски кубанских казаков, Ansamblʹ pesni i pljaski kubanskix kazakov). Such was the professionalisation of this and other such 'folk ensembles' under Stalin's regime that the group in effect consisted of professional musicians and dancers, graduates of Soviet music and dance schools and not necessarily of Cossack descent. During the Second World War, the group toured several fronts and performed for Red Army soldiers and particularly the Kuban Cossack regiments that served in the ranks.

In 1961, under the initiative of Nikita Khrushchev the ensemble was again dissolved. In this year many similar folkloric groups were dissolved in the USSR. In 1968, under the leadership of Sergey Chernobay the ensemble was once again re-established as part of the State Russian folk choirs. Three years later the re-established chorus debuted at the Bulgarian international Festival of Folklore, where it earned the first of many titles it would receive in numerous festivals and competitions.

=== Zakharchenko ===
External videos
- Rospryhayte Khloptsy Koney. Unharness the Horses, Guys, a Cossack staple, performed by the Choir in Moscow, 2008.

In 1974, Viktor Gavrilovich Zakharchenko assumed the office of artistic director. He continues to lead the choir to this day. Zakharchenko was a local transferred back to Kuban from the Siberian Chorus he previously helped direct. Due to his efforts, in 1975 the choir became laureates of the First All Russian screening competition of state folk choirs in Moscow, and again in 1984. In October 1988, by order of the Presidium of the Supreme Soviet of the USSR, the choir was awarded the Order of Friendship of Peoples, and in 1990 became a laureate of the Taras Shevchenko State Ukrainian Prize in Ukraine. Its highest award was received in 1993 when the choir was awarded the title of "Academic".

==== Recent times ====
During the post-USSR years, the chorus has channeled its energy into the collection and rebirth of the Cossack traditions, demonstrating pride in Russian patriotism and local customs. In August 1995, Patriarch Alexius II allowed the Host to sing church liturgy once again, and from October 1996, by decree of Krasnodar Krai governor Aleksandr Tkachyov, the choir has been recognised as a direct successor to the old Host choir of 1811.

Despite its turbulent past, the chorus has grown to become one of the leading concert ensembles in Russia. It regularly tours abroad and has appeared in Japan, France, Italy, Spain, Portugal, Germany, Norway, China, Vietnam, Poland, Czechia, Bulgaria, Serbia, and Australia.

== Center of Cossack Folklore ==
In 1990 on the basis of the Kuban Cossack Chorus, a center of folk culture of Kuban was set up. Its mandate is to collect, study and revive cultural traditions of the Kuban Cossacks. The Centre has children's and teenage choirs and folk-instrument ensembles. It also collects traditional clothing and relics of the past from village life.

== Program ==
Cossack songs and dances, mostly in Russian, a few in the Ukrainian language, are a standard part of its programmes. In addition the Chorus transforms poems into songs, such as those of Alexander Pushkin and Taras Shevchenko. It also performs famous non-Cossack songs such as Katyusha.

== Notes and references ==
- Olson, Laura J. (2004). Performing Russia: Folk revival and Russian identity. RoutledgeCurzon. ISBN 0-415-32614-1.
