= Laura Olson Osterman =

Laura Olson Osterman (a.k.a. Laura J. Olson, born in 1962) is an American professor of Russian Program, Dept. of Germanic and Slavic Languages and Literature at the University of Colorado Boulder. She teaches courses on Slavic folk culture, Russian fairytales, and women in Russian culture, among others.

Olson was born in New York. She received M.A. Comparative Literature from Indiana University Bloomington in 1990 and Ph.D. Slavic Languages and Literatures from Yale University in 1994.

== Books ==
- Performing Russia: Folk Revival and Russian Identity (RoutledgeCurzon, 2004)
- The Worlds of Russian Village Women: Tradition, Transgression, Compromise (University of Wisconsin Press 2012, with Svetlana Adonyeva)
  - Russian translation: Традиция, трансгрессия, компромисс. Миры русской деревенской женщины [Traditsiia, transgressiia, kompromiss: Miry russkoi derevenskoi zhenshchiny], Moscow, 2016

== Awards ==
The book The Worlds of Russian Village Women was awarded the Chicago Folklore Prize for the best book-length work of folklore scholarship for 2013, and the Elli Köngäs-Maranda Prize by the Women's Section of the American Folklore Society (Professional Prize, 2013).
