= Antin Paplynsky =

Ukrainian musical instrument maker

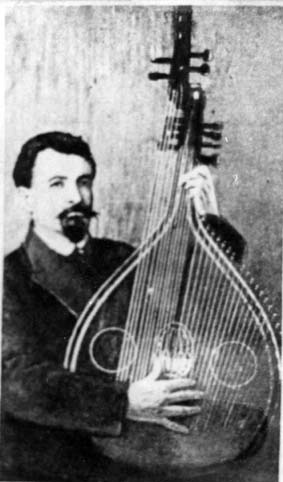
A. Paplynsky

Antin Paplynsky (Ukrainian: Антоній Паплинський (c. 1870-c.1919) was a Ukrainian musical instrument maker who crafted banduras from 1905-1918. He was rumoured to have been shot by the Bolsheviks in 1919 or 1920. Paplynsky's instruments had 32-34 strings and were diatonically tuned. He was a popular bandura maker because of the quality of his instruments. In 1909 he received a Grand Prix award at the World Trade Exhibition held in Paris. His instruments were sought after not only in Ukraine, but in Russia and Canada.

== Instruments ==
Paplynsky's instruments were extremely lightweight and produced a rich and bright sound. Few instruments have survived. Those that have can fetch up to C$5000 in private sales.

== External reading ==
- Diakowsky, M. - A Note on the History of the Bandura. The Annals of the Ukrainian Academy of Arts and Sciences in the U.S. - 4, 3-4 №1419, N.Y. 1958 - С.21-22
- Diakowsky, M. J. - The Bandura. The Ukrainian Trend, 1958, №I, - С.18-36
- Diakowsky, M. – Anyone can make a bandura – I did. The Ukrainian Trend, Volume 6
- Haydamaka, L. – Kobza-bandura – National Ukrainian Musical Instrument. "Guitar Review" №33, Summer 1970 (С.13-18)
- Hornjatkevyč, A. – The book of Kodnia and the three Bandurists. Bandura, #11-12, 1985
- Hornjatkevyč A. J., Nichols T. R. - The Bandura. Canada crafts, April–May, 1979 p. 28-29
- Mishalow, V. - A Brief Description of the Zinkiv Method of Bandura Playing. Bandura, 1982, №2/6, - С.23-26
- Mishalow, V. - The Kharkiv style #1. Bandura 1982, №6, - С.15-22 #2 – Bandura 1985, №13-14, - С.20-23 #3 – Bandura 1988, №23-24, - С.31-34 #4 – Bandura 1987, №19-20, - С.31-34 #5 – Bandura 1987, №21-22, - С.34-35
- Mishalow, V. - A Short History of the Bandura. East European Meetings in Ethnomusicology 1999, Romanian Society for Ethnomusicology, Volume 6, - С.69-86
- Mizynec, V. - Folk Instruments of Ukraine. Bayda Books, Melbourne, Australia, 1987 - 48с.
- Cherkaskyi, L. - Ukrainski narodni muzychni instrumenty. Tekhnika, Kyiv, Ukraine, 2003 - 262 pages. ISBN 966-575-111-5
