= Sydir Bily =

- Сидір Білий
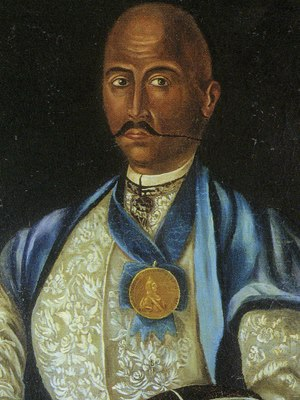

Zaporozhian Kish otaman

Personal details
- Born: Sydir Dzhuliy; 1735
- Died: June 20, 1788 Ochakiv, Ukraine
- Spouse: Maria Danylivna

Sidor Bely or Sydir Bily (1716 — 20 July 1788) was Kish otaman of the Black Sea Cossack Host.

== Biography ==
Bily was born in 1716 to a Cossack family near Kherson. He studied in the Kiev-Mohyla Academy after which he joined the Sich as a young man where he continued his studies in the Sich officer school.

Due to his talents he was chosen to be an osaul. He took part in numerous sea and land campaigns on the Danube and in Crimea where he gained a reputation as a fine commander and seaman.

In the 1760s he carried out special assignments for Petro Kalnyshevsky. Because of his intelligence and education he was always trusted and was popular. He travelled to St Petersburg with Kalnyshevsky and Antin Holovaty in January 1762 for the coronation of Catherine II. Bily was honoured with a gold medal and nobility status.

Coat of arms of Sydir Bily

After his return to the Sich in 1774, Bily and Antin Holovaty once again sent to St Petersburg, where he represented the rights of the cossacks and the return of confiscated lands. Their petition was ignored. The fate of the Sich was sealed on April 23, 1775, at a council meeting in the Palace to which Bily and Holovaty were not invited.

During the destruction of the Sich, Bily was in St Petersburg. On his return all he saw of the Sich were ruins. He was able to avoid repercussions and repressions by the direct intervention of Grigory Potemkin. Bily was retired as a major in the Russian army and tended to the management of his estates. In 1786 he headed the council of nobility in Kherson.

This period is described in various ways. Some state that he moved to the Danubian Sich, and he was labelled a traitor, that he sold out to the Empress for a gold medal. Analysis tends to lead us to the fact that Bily was a skillful politician and understood the politics of the time. He understood that the Sich could not continue within the Russian Empire and understood that it could only survive outside of the Russian Empire. As a result he moved to the Danube and started creating the "Host of Loyal Zaporozhians".

Kherson at that time had started building large sail-boats - corvettes, frigates and line boats for the future Black Sea fleet. Bily took part in the construction of these boats and also in the selection and training of future sailors from the Ukrainian population.

With the addition of Crimea to the Russian Empire, Turkey understood this as being a breaking of the Treaty of Kujchuk-Karnadji. Turkey sent a fleet of 25 large boats and war broke loose.

Commanders were sent from the Baltics, and the Azov fleet was sent to engage the Turks. Potemkin's admirals did not know the conditions in the Dnieper-Black Sea region and as a result Bily took a commanding role. After handing over command of the fleet to vice-admiral F. Klokachov, Bily returned to Kherson where he took command of the Lyman fleet, which was still to be built. The fleet was built in 1787 made up of Cossack Chaikas (one of which is in the Cossack museum in Khortytsia today) and brigants.

During Catherine II visit through Ukraine and Crimea in 1787, Sydir Bily accompanied her with a guard of Cossacks. Catherine was happy with the service and agreed to pardon the Cossacks who had left the Russian Empire. Potemkin placed the French Prince Karl Heinrich Nassau-Zigen as commander of the Lyman fleet.

Sydir became the commander of the Cossack Chaikas.

27 February 1787 Suvorov sent Koshovy Bily to the Empress to petition for the return of the Zaporozhian attributes: a large white with blue cross flag, some other smaller flags, bulava etc. The flag became the basis for the current Navy flag of Ukraine.

The word Zaporozhian however, was no longer allowed to be used, although Suvorov paid no heed to the ban.

September 7, 1787, the next Russo-Turkish war erupted. The tragedy of this campaign was that they not only fought the Turks, but also their brethren who had resettled in the Danubian Sich.

The fleet led by Sydir Bily had negotiated with the Danubian Cossacks not to engage them in combat. They shot their cannon a number of times and returned to shore. The refusal of the Danubian Cossacks to fight their brothers guaranteed Potemkin victory.

On the 17 June near Ochakiv a new battle erupted. A number of boats of Eksi-Hasan were grounded in the shallow waters. The Lyman flotilla attacked and destroyed six frigates. During the attack 18 cossacks died and 235 were taken captive. Sydir Bily was also wounded. He was taken to the Kinburg fortress. Suvorov gave him his finest doctors, but this was all in vain.

Bily died June 20, 1788, at the age of 72. At his funeral were Suvorov, Antin Holovaty, contr-admiral John Paul Jones.
