= De-Cossackization =

Systemic repressions of the Cossacks under the Bolsheviks from 1919 to 1933

- Part of the Red Terror
- 1918 poster stating "This is how the Bolsheviks rule in the Cossack villages"
- Location: Don and Kuban, Russia
- Date: 1919–1933
- Attack type: Deportation, execution, ethnic cleansing
- Deaths: Anywhere from 10,000 to 700,000
- Victims: At least 45,000 Cossacks deported to Ukraine, potentially up to 300,000 to 500,000 Cossacks deported and a lower amount killed overall
- Perpetrators: Red Army; Cheka

De-Cossackization (Russian: Расказачивание, romanized: Raskazachivaniye; Ukrainian: Розкозачення, romanized: Rozkozachennja) was the Bolshevik policy of systematic repression against the Cossacks in territories of the former Russian Empire between 1919 and 1933, especially the Don and Kuban Cossacks in Russia, aimed at the elimination of the Cossacks as a distinct collectivity by exterminating the Cossack élite, coercing all other Cossacks into compliance, and eliminating Cossack distinctness. Several scholars have categorised this as a form of genocide, whilst other historians have highly disputed this classification due to the contentious figures involved, which range from "a few thousand to incredible claims of hundreds of thousands".

The campaign began in March 1919 in response to growing Cossack insurgency. The process has been described by scholar Peter Holquist as part of a "ruthless" and "radical attempt to eliminate undesirable social groups" that showed the Soviet regime's "dedication to social engineering". Throughout this period, the policy underwent significant modifications, which resulted in the "normalization" of Cossacks as a component part of Soviet society.

== De-Cossackization ==
Cossacks were simultaneously both an ethnicity and a grouping of special social estates in the Russian Empire from the 16th to the early 20th century. Because of their military tradition, Cossack forces played an important role in Russia's wars of the 17th–20th centuries such as the Crimean War (1853–1856), the Napoleonic Wars, various Russo-Turkish Wars, and the First World War of 1914–1918. In the late 19th and early 20th centuries, the tsarist regime deployed Cossack detachments to perform police service and to suppress revolutionary movements, especially in 1905–1907.

Following the October Revolution of 1917, a conflict broke out between the new Bolshevik Communist regime in Russia and many Cossacks. In the Don territory, the Ataman of the Don Cossacks, Alexey Kaledin, declared that he would "offer full support, in close alliance with the governments of the other Cossack hosts" to Kerensky's forces (the Bolsheviks' opponents in the civil war). Establishing ties with the Ukrainian Central Rada and with the Kuban, Terek, and Orenburg hosts, Kaledin sought to overthrow the Soviet regime in Russia. On 15 November 1917, White Generals Kornilov, Alekseev and Denikin began to organize a force that would become the Volunteer Army in the Cossack cultural capital, Novocherkassk. Imposing martial law, Cossack leader Kaledin started to advance in late November. On 15 December [O.S. 2 December] 1917, after a seven-day battle, his forces occupied Rostov. However, on 25 February [O.S. 12 February] 1918, Bolshevik troops pushed back successfully and occupied Rostov and Novocherkassk. The remnants of the White Cossacks, headed by Ataman Pyotr Kharitonovich Popov, fled into the Salsk steppes, in an event known as the Steppe March.

After the Imperial German army invaded and occupied Rostov on 8 May 1918, a government headed by Ataman Krasnov was formed in the Don province. In July 1918, the White Cossack forces of Ataman Krasnov launched their first invasion of Tsaritsyn (present-day Volgograd). Soviet forces counterattacked, however, and drove out the White Cossacks by 7 September. On 22 September, Krasnov's forces launched a second invasion of Tsaritsyn, but by 25 October Soviet troops had pushed Krasnov's forces back beyond the Don. On 1 January 1919, Krasnov launched a third invasion of Tsaritsyn. Soviet forces repelled the invasion again and forced Krasnov's forces to withdraw from Tsaritsyn in mid-February 1919.

== History ==
The policy was established by a secret resolution of the Bolshevik Party on 24 January 1919, which ordered local branches to "carry out mass terror against wealthy Cossacks, exterminating all of them; carry out merciless mass terror against any and all Cossacks taking part in any way, directly or indirectly, in the struggle against Soviet power". On 7 February the Southern Front issued its own instructions on how the resolution was to be applied: "The main duty of stanitsa and khutor executive committees is to neutralize the Cossackry through the merciless extirpation of its elite. District and Stanitsa atamans are subject to unconditional elimination, [but] khutor atamans should be subject to execution only in those cases where it can be proved that they actively supported Krasnov's policies (having organized pacification, conducted mobilization, refused to offer refuge to revolutionary Cossacks or to Red Army men)." There were also proposals for the "mass resettlement" of poor peasants in Cossack territories, which would ultimately result in Sovnarkom implementing the forced migration of Cossacks in April.

In mid-March 1919 alone, Cheka forces condemned more than 8,000 Cossacks to death. In each stanitsa, summary judgements were passed by revolutionary courts within minutes, and whole lists of people were condemned to execution for "counterrevolutionary behavior".

The Don region was required by the Soviets to make a grain contribution equal to the total annual production of the area. Almost all Cossacks joined the Green Army or other rebel forces. Together with Baron Wrangel's troops, they forced the Red Army out of the region in August 1920. After the retaking of the Crimea by Red Army, the Cossacks again became victims of the Red Terror. Special commissions in charge of de-Cossackization condemned more than 6,000 people to death in October 1920 alone. The families and often the neighbours of suspected rebels were taken as hostages.

Gathered together in a camp near Maikop, the hostages, women, children and old men survive in the most appalling conditions, in the cold and the mud of October ... They are dying like flies. The women will do anything to escape death. The soldiers guarding the camp take advantage of this and treat them as prostitutes.

In November 1920, Feliks Dzerzhinsky, head of the Cheka, reported to Lenin:

the republic has to organize the internment in camps of about 100,000 prisoners from the Southern front and vast masses of people expelled from the rebellious [Cossack] settlements of the Terek, the Kuban, and the Don. Today 403 Cossack men and women aged between 14 and 17 arrived in Oryol for internment in the internment camp. They cannot be accepted as Oryol is already overloaded.

James Ryan argues that Lenin was aware that this policy had genocidal implications, as he was telegraphed by the Southern Front Revolutionary Military Council (RVS) who complained that the policy did not account for mass surrenders by Cossacks. Following this, indiscriminate killings were abandoned and the Southern RVS was ordered by Lenin not to antagonise the general Cossack population by "violating 'trivial' features of everyday Cossack life." However, uprisings against Bolshevik authority in the Don region that followed the killings were still heavily cracked down upon. In August, Lenin also instructed Dzerzhinsky to use "bribery and threats to exterminate the Cossacks to a man" if they attempted to destroy the oil in the city of Guryev.

The Pyatigorsk Cheka organized a "day of Red Terror" to execute 300 people in one day. They ordered local Communist Party organizations to draw up execution lists. According to one of the chekists, "this rather unsatisfactory method led to a great deal of private settling of old scores. ... In Kislovodsk, for lack of a better idea, it was decided to kill people who were in the hospital." Many Cossack towns were burned to the ground, and all survivors deported on the orders by Sergo Ordzhonikidze who was head of the Revolutionary Committee of the Northern Caucasus.

== Effects on the Cossacks ==
The deportations and exterminations are recognized as genocide by modern scholars. While there were more than a million Cossacks before 1917, very few people consider themselves Cossacks today. Shane O'Rourke states that the de-Cossackization "was one of the main factors which led to the disappearance of the Cossacks as a nation".

According to Łukasz Adamski and Bartłomiej Gajos, the exact death toll from de-Cossackization is highly contentious, with estimates ranging from thousands to hundreds of thousands. Several factors contribute to the difficulty of estimating the death toll, including exaggerated numbers published by the white movement and varying definitions of the genocide; some historians count the deaths of the Holodomor in the Don region, a famine that killed hundreds of thousands of Don Cossacks and Ukrainians.

Robert Gellately claims that "the most reliable estimates indicate that between 300,000 and 500,000 were killed or deported in 1919–20" out of a population of around three million, with most being deported. Alexander Nikolaevich Yakovlev, head of the Presidential Committee for the Rehabilitation of Victims of Political Repression, writes that "hundreds of thousands of Cossacks were killed", and Rudolph Rummel cites an estimate of 700,000 deaths in the Don Cossack genocide.

Peter Holquist estimates a death toll in the thousands or tens of thousands in the period 1919–20, but notes that the extent of the genocide varied substantially by region. In some regions such as Khoper, tribunals executed thousands of Cossacks in a full-fledged extermination attempt, while some other tribunals did not conduct any executions at all.

Research by Pavel Polian from Russian Academy of Sciences on the subject of forced settlements in the Soviet Union shows that more than 45,000 Cossacks were deported from the Terek Oblast to Ukraine. Their land was distributed among Cossack collaborators and Chechens.

According to the Dictionary of Genocides, the "genocidal treatment" of the Cossacks was based on class, ethnicity and politics and part of a broader Bolshevik policy of remaking society.

== See also ==
- Dekulakization
- Mass killings under communist regimes
- Persecution of Christians in the Soviet Union
- Population transfer in the Soviet Union
- Poltavskaya § Collectivization and deportation – deportation of a largely Cossack locality during the Soviet famine of 1932–33
