= Antin Holovaty =

Ukrainian Cossack leader in Russian service

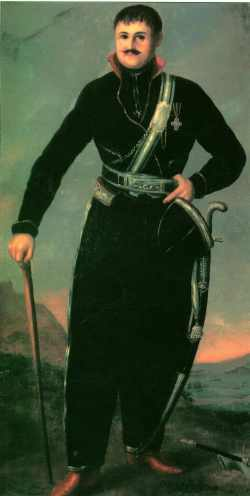

Host Judge of the Black Sea Cossack Host 3rd Ataman of the Black Sea Cossack Host
- Preceded by: Zakhary Chepiha
- Succeeded by: Feodor Bursak

Personal details
- Born: Unconfirmed, believed to be between 1732 and 1744 Novi Sanzhary, Cossack Hetmanate, Russian Empire (modern Ukraine)
- Died: 28 January 1797 Kamyshevan, Persia (modern Kura spit Azerbaijan)
- Spouse: Ulyana Grigoryevna Prokhna
- Children: six sons
- Education: Kyiv-Mohyla Academy
- Occupation: Cossack leader

Antin Holovaty (Ukrainian: Антiн Андрійович Головатий) or Anton Golovaty (Russian: Антон Андреевич Головатый); between 1732 and 1744 – 28 January 1797 was a prominent Zaporozhian Cossack leader who after the Zaporozhian Sich's destruction was a key figure in the formation of the Black Sea Cossack Host and their later resettlement to the Kuban Region of Russia.

== Biography ==
=== Early years ===
Holovaty was born in the town of Novi Sanzhary (modern Poltava Oblast, Ukraine) in a family of Cossack starshyna and studied at the Kiev-Mohyla Academy. Aged 24, 1756 he left the academy and joined the Kushchivsky kuren of the Pidpelnensky Sich to complete his studies as an officer. By the 1760s was elected to be the Otaman of that Kuren, which helped raise his social standing.

By 1764, because of his higher education he received the rank of colonel and was given the position of military secretary. In that year, as part of the Zaporozhian delegation headed by Kish otaman Hrytsko Fedoriv, Holovaty was chosen as a delegate to the coronation of Catherine II of Russia. The trip left a profound impression on him. He delighted the audiences with his musical prowess on the bandura, entertaining the audiences with Cossack songs and dumas. For this he received a silver medal and a noble title from the Empress.

During his trip, Holovaty became aware that the demise of the Zaporozhian Sich was being discussed and planned in Petersburg. Knowing that the end of the Crimean Khanate would result in the eventual dissolution of the Zaporozhian Host, he was pro-active in putting forward a plan to re-organize the Sich and lands it owned in a manner similar to how the Don Cossack Host was organised. This project was given for consideration to Russian authorities, but was discarded by Potemkin. The Zaporozhian Sich was dissolved in 1775 and Holovaty's plans and political maneuvering were exposed to other Zaporozhians who ceased to trust him. As a result, Holovaty retired from the Zaporozhian Host to manage his properties.

=== After the end of Zaporozhia ===
With the destruction of the Zaporozhian Sich in 1775, the most senior Cossacks were repressed. Among them was Holovaty's older brother Pavlo who was one of those arrested together with the last Zaporozhian kosh otaman Petro Kalnyshevsky. Both Kalnyshevsky and Pavlo Holovaty spent a year incarcerated in Moscow, and were given death sentences which were later commuted to incarceration for life. Kalnyshevsky was later pardoned aged 110. Most Cossacks escaped repressions by moving beyond the Danube into Turkish territory.

Holovaty escaped repercussions because he had retired from the Zaporozhian host. A factor which was also of influence was that he was given the rank of captain in the Russian Cavalry by the Empress, and was granted an official nobility (dvoryanstvo) title with an estate.

After the dissolution of the Zaporozhian Host, a new threat to the Russian Empire began to grow from the Ottoman Empire. The destruction of Sich, was followed when five thousand men, approximately 30% of the Zaporozhian Cossacks, left for the Ottoman-controlled Danube area in June 1775 and received protection from the Sultan forming the Danubian Sich under his protectorate. By 1778 they were followed by another 7000 Cossacks to the Danubian Sich with 4000 settling on the Boh river and forming the Boh Cossack Host. The former Zaporozhians gave their oaths to serve the Sultan on both land and sea against all enemies of the Silistrine Pasha, They were ordered to defend the borders against Russian intrusion.

It soon became apparent that the destruction of the Zaporozhian Sich was a grave mistake, and soon afterwards attempts were made to have the Danubian Cossacks return to Russia. Catherine II issued an amnesty inviting the former Zaporozhians back, but this gesture was largely ignored. The Empress then tried to force the return of the Cossacks back by pressuring Sultan Abdul Hamid I, who also refused to comply. Previously, the Ottoman Empire has given patronage to Cossacks emigrating from Russia, such as the Nekrasov Cossacks, and the Sultan wanting to win back the Crimea, saw the Zaporozhians as a strong asset.

Potemkin understood that to have the former Zaporozhians against the Russian forces in a future conflict could prove disastrous. In 1784 Grigory Potemkin sent Sydir Bily to the Danube to discuss the demands of the Cossacks. His mission was largely unsuccessful, as the Danubians wanted not only the return of all Cossack lands and titles, but also the previous autonomy that the Sich enjoyed. This was something that Potemkin was not prepared to do.

In 1787, on the eve of the Empress' trip to Ukraine, Potemkin summoned Holovaty and sent him to greet her in Kremenchuk. It is here that Holovaty once again presented the idea of gathering up the remaining Cossacks and renewing the Zaporozhian Sich. After the previously unsuccessful attempts of organizing a Cossack army, Potemkin gave entrusted Holovaty to rally the men, a task he successfully accomplished.

=== Russo-Turkish War (1787–1792) ===
In 1787, Holovaty returned to active duty and became the chancellor and judge of the new Host of Loyal Zaporozhians, with Sydor Bily as the Otaman. The new host was made up of former Zaporozhian Cossack volunteers

When the war with Turkey finally broke out, the new Host played a crucial role in helping the Russian Army, particularly in capture of Berezan fortress, gaining the Potemkin's and the Empress's favour.

=== Settlement in the Kuban (1792) ===
Following the Russian victory, the Cossacks awaited their promised territories on the Taman Peninsula, however, with the death of G. Potemkin this reward was not forthcoming. Potemkin had left no instructions in case of the eventuality of his death. This led to an escalation of dissatisfaction among the Cossacks.

To stop further dissent, Holovaty headed another delegation to St. Petersburg to petition the Empress for the promises Potemkin had guaranteed. The delegation left in March 1792 arriving in St. Petersburg a month later. Dressed in Cossack attire and with characteristic Zaporozhian haircuts were treated by the Russian court like a group of barbarians, however, Holovaty was able to obtain an audience before the Empress. He stunned the court by speaking to the Empress in French and immediately gained her sympathies. The concerns of the Cossacks were stated and the terms and conditions for the famous tsarist edict granting the Zaporozhians the lands on the Taman Peninsula in perpetuity were negotiated. Holovaty became a popular figure in Petersburg, often entertaining the nobility at various functions with Cossacks songs accompanied by his bandura playing. He left Petersburg in July with the now famous edict and numerous gifts.

The Kuban territory in the North Caucasus was an uninhabited steppe region that was gained by the Russian Empire in 1784. It was nonetheless a crucial foothold for the Russian expansion into the Caucasus.

On his return, Holovaty proclaimed the good news regarding their petition and demonstrated the many gifts given by the Empress. He organised the resettlement of 25,000 persons who made the migration in 1792–93, settling on the regions north of the Kuban River, with Holovaty leading the last convoy that landed on Taman Peninsula on 15 August 1793.

Holovaty became the new head of the Host. He set his priorities in forming the new defense line against Circassian raids. (see Caucasus War). The first 40 kurens on the Kuban, (later stanitsas) and the host city of Yekaterinodar are built under his supervision. After the death of Ataman Zakhary Chepiha, the Host elected Holovaty as the new Ataman, however he was not aware of this title, as at that time he was participating in the ill-fated Persian Expedition of 1796 where he commanded two corps of Black Sea Cossacks. On 28 January 1797, two weeks after his election, Holovaty died on the Kamyshevan peninsula. His title of Ataman was passed onto General Feodor Bursak, also an ex-Zaporozhian.

Holovaty mas married to Ulyana Grigoryevna Golovataya (Prokhna) who met in Saint Petersburg in 1768. In total they had six sons.

== Cultural figure ==
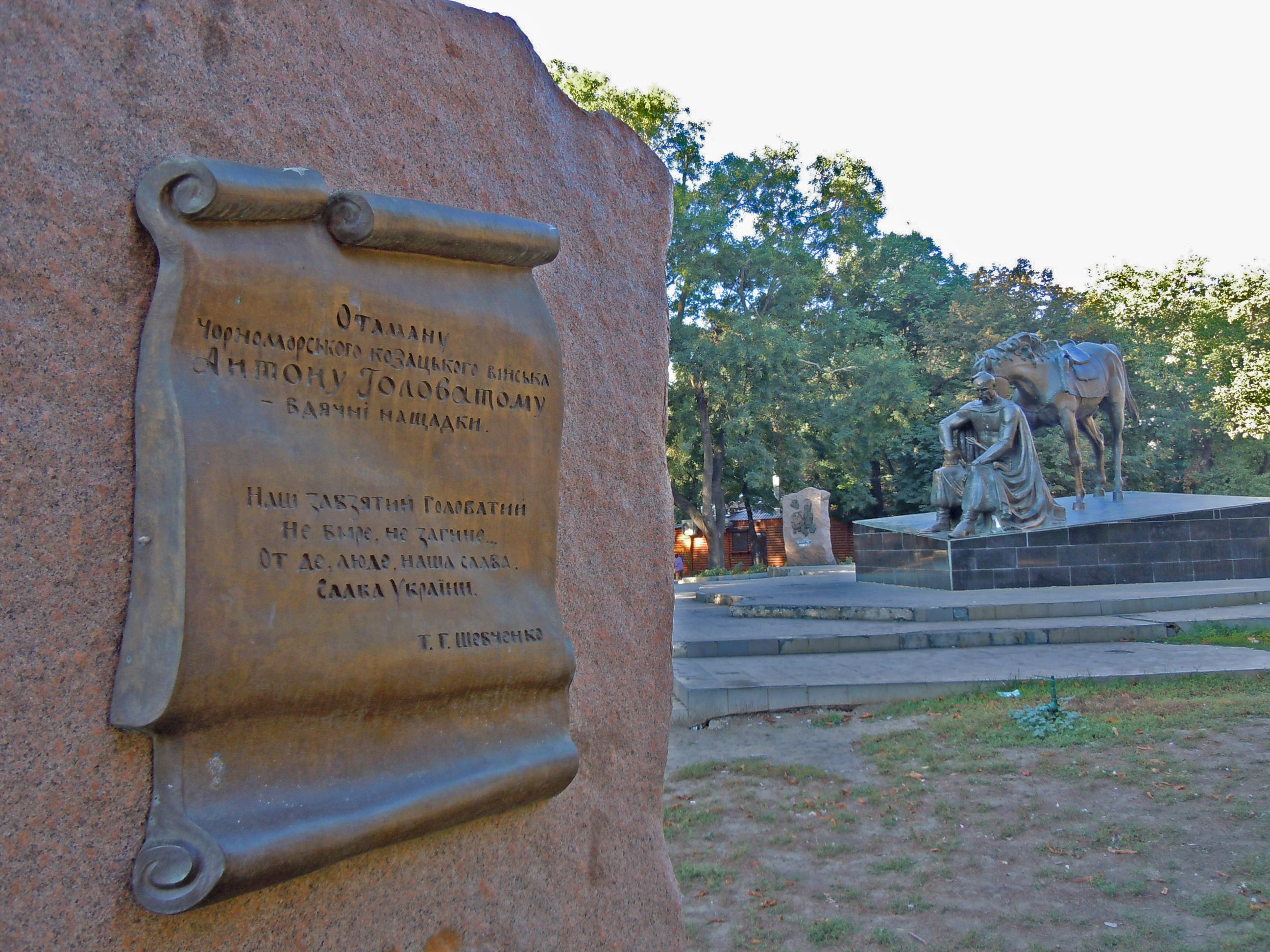
The lines often ascribed to Taras Shevchenko. The part of Holovaty monument in Odessa

Holovaty was a renowned poet in his day. To his pen are dedicated a number of poems some of which became songs in the Ukrainian language. It is known that Taras Shevchenko collected them and included lines from them in his Kobzar. Shevchenko originally mentioned Holovaty in a number of his poems, however his name was edited out by P. Kulish in reflection of Holovaty's pro-Russian position.

The frequently quoted lines often ascribed to Taras Shevchenko:

Nasha duma, nasha pisnia, (Our dumas, our songs)
Ne vmre ne zahyne, (Will not die nor perish)
Ot de liudy nasha slava, (Here is where our glory lies)
Slava Ukrainy! (The glory of Ukraine)

were originally edited by P. Kulish from Shevchenko's original:

Nash chubaty Holovaty, (Our hairy-headed Holovaty)
Ne vmre, ne zahyne, (Will not die nor perish)
Ot de liudy nasha slava, (Here is where our glory lies)
Slava Ukrainy. (The glory of Ukraine)

Shevchenko also drew a portrait of him.

Because of his noble education he was also well versed in music and was an accomplished bandura player.

Holovaty is commemorated in a joint monument in honour of Cathrine II, that was erected in 1902 in Yekaterinodar to mark the century anniversary of the Black Sea Cossack landing. This monument was destroyed by the Bolsheviks, and has recently been restored. Another individual monument to Holovaty was erected in 1990 in Odessa.

== Notes ==
The instrument that Holovaty played was probably a torban, rather than a plain bandura. The torban, often called a "panska bandura" was a Ukrainian variant of the bass lutes popular in Europe. It is known that quite a number of the Cossack gentry such as Ivan Mazepa and Semen Paliy also played the instrument.

Preceded by Zakhariy Chepiga	Ataman of the Black Sea Cossacks; 1796–1797	Succeeded by Fedor Bursak
