= Klyn =

Klyn (Ukrainian: клин, lit. 'wedge') is commonly used to refer to various territories historically inhabited by large numbers of Ukrainian people within the modern day Russia.

Klyn may refer to:

- Zeleny Klyn or Green Ukraine, a territory in the Russian Far East
- Grey Ukraine or Siryi Klyn, a territory in the Siberia and Northern Kazakhstan
- Yellow Ukraine or Zhovty Klyn, a territory centered on the middle and lower Volga river
- Raspberry Ukraine or Malynovyi Klyn, known as the Kuban, a territory in the northwest Caucasus that was majority Ukrainian until the Holodomor and Russification of local Ukrainians

== See also ==
- Ukrainian diaspora
- Ukrainians in Russia
- Ukrainians in Siberia
- Ukrainians in Kuban
