= Ukrainians in Kuban =

Ethnic group in the Kuban region of southern Russia

The Ukrainians in Kuban (Ukrainian: Українці на Кубані, romanized: Ukraintsi na Kubani) in southern Russia constitute a national minority. The region as a whole shares many linguistic, cultural and historic ties with Ukraine. Тhe area where Ukrainians live in Kuban is sometimes unofficially referred to as Raspberry Ukraine or Malynovyi Klyn (Ukrainian: Малиновий Клин).

Ukrainians first settled in the Kuban region in 1792. Until the mid-twentieth century the majority of the population there identified themselves as Ukrainians. Due to Russian and Soviet national policies—including the Holodomor—most of the population became Russified, and the percentage of those who identified themselves as Ukrainians dropped from an official 55% (1926) to 0.9% (2002).

== Ukrainian settlement ==
In Kuban many Ukrainians were settled in areas which were inhabited by Russians when in 1792 the Empress Catherine II gave the Black Sea Cossack Host the rights to these lands. Her decree of June 30 and July 1, 1792 handed these lands over to the Black Sea Cossacks "for eternity". The territory involved included the Phanagorian peninsula and the lands on the right bank of the Kuban River.

Between 1792 and 1793 25,000 people settled the area, marking the first wave of Ukrainian settlement to the Kuban. The Cossack navy, consisting of 51 boats with 3247 people, landed on the shores of the Kuban on August 25, 1792. A second group of 600 people arrived with cattle overland. In October 1792 a third group arrived under the command of otaman Zakhary Chepiha. The final group arrived from Ukraine in 1793 under the command of Antin Holovaty.

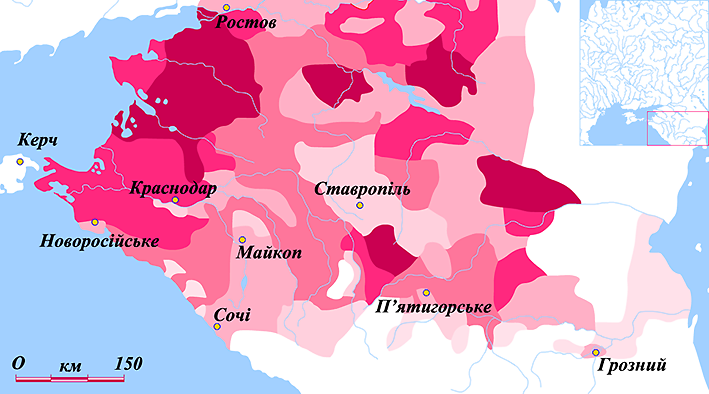
Ukrainians in Kuban according to the census of 1926.: 90-75% 75-50% 50-25% / 25-10% 10-5% 5-2%

Between 1806 and 1809 about 562 Ukrainian Cossacks who had settled previously beyond the Danube were granted a pardon and arrived on the shores of the Taman Peninsula.

Between 1809 and 1811, 41,635 settlers arrived from Poltava and Chernihiv. This marked the second wave of settlers from Ukraine. During the 3rd wave in 1820–1825, 59,455 men and women migrated. The fourth wave of 11,949 people arrived from the Kharkiv, Chernihiv and Poltava regions in 1848–1849. In all, from 1792 to 1850, 105,000 people moved to Kuban from Ukraine.

The lands settled by the Ukrainians were known as the Lands of the Black Sea Host. 40 kurin settlements were allowed, which were not only administrative units, but encompassed specific territories. Settlers from Ukraine founded a town which became known as Yekaterinodar. In 1860 the Kuban oblast was formed.

After the February Revolution of 1917 a temporary Kuban Military government was formed. Two sides struggled to obtain supremacy: a pro-Ukrainian and a pro-Russian faction. The pro-Ukrainian faction supported autonomy for Kuban and the formation of a Union with Ukraine. Also Ukrainian cultural life flowered. Ukrainian-language schools opened and 6 newspapers began to publish in Ukrainian. In May 1918 a delegation headed by the head of the Kuban Rada M. Riabovol visited Kyiv. Diplomatic ties were announced between the Kuban People's Republic and the Ukrainian People's Republic.

To cement its hold in Kuban, the Soviet government allowed a period of Ukrainianisation in the 1920s where Ukrainian cultural life was allowed to flourish. This was suddenly and brutally stopped in 1929, in an era known in Ukraine as the Executed Renaissance, and escalated in 1932, exacerbated by the events of Holodomor.

Ukrainization was effectively outlawed in 1932. Specifically, the December 14, 1932 decree "On Grain Collection in Ukraine, North Caucasus and the Western Oblasts" by the VKP(b) Central Committee and USSR Sovnarkom stated that Ukrainization in certain areas was carried out formally, in a "non-Bolshevik" way, which provided the "bourgeois-nationalist elements" with a legal cover for organizing their anti-Soviet resistance.

In order to stop this, the decree ordered in these areas, among other things, to switch to Russian all newspapers and magazines, and all Soviet and cooperative paperwork. By the autumn of 1932 (beginning of a school year), all schools were ordered to switch to Russian. In addition the decree ordered a massive population swap: all "disloyal" population from a major Cossack settlement, stanitsa Poltavskaya was banished to Northern Russia, with their property given to loyal kolkhozniks moved from poorer areas of Russia. This forced end to Ukrainization in southern RSFSR had led to a massive decline of reported Ukrainians in these regions in the 1937 Soviet Census compared to the 1926 First All-Union Census of the Soviet Union.

== Forced russification ==
In 1930 the Ukrainian People's Komissar Mykola Skrypnyk as one of those involved in solving the nationalities question within the USSR put forward suggestions to Joseph Stalin:

- 1) That the Constitution of the Ukrainian SSR be valid on the territory of the whole USSR
- 2) That the territories of Voronezh, Kursk, Chornomoriya, Azov, Kuban regions be administered by the government of the Ukrainian SSR
- 3) That Ukrainian colonies in the Russian SFSR and other Soviet Republics be given national-political autonomy (VS. p 36)

In 1932–1933, the policies of forced collectivization of the Ukrainian population of the Soviet Union, which caused a devastating famine that greatly affected the Ukrainian population of the Kuban. The number of documented victims of famine in Kuban was at least 62,000. According to other historians, the real death toll is many times higher. Brain Boeck thinks the figure more in the "hundreds of thousands". One source estimate that during the Soviet famine of 1932–1933 Krasnodar lost over 14% of its population. The Kuban corresponding to the famine had a reversal of the previously attempted policy of Ukrainisation. Prior to the reversal of Ukrainianization, the policy was failing in the Kuban with most local districts not completing it partially due to opposition by local Cossack nationalists and Russian chauvinists in the Kuban including by sabotage despite punitive threats from the state to complete the process made in May 1932.

The large Cossack stanitsa Poltavskaia sabotaged and resisted collectivization more than any other area in the Kuban which was perceived by Lazar Kaganovich to be connected to Ukrainian nationalist and Cossack conspiracy. Kaganovich relentlessly pursued the policy of requisition of grain in Poltavskaia and the rest of the Kuban and personally oversaw the purging of local leaders and Cossacks. Kaganovich viewed the resistance of Poltavskaia through Ukrainian lens delivering oration in a mixed Ukrainian language. To justify this Kaganovich cited a letter allegedly written by a stanitsa ataman named Grigorii Omel'chenko advocating Cossack separatism and local reports of resistance to collectivization in association with this figure to substantiate this suspicion of the area. However Kaganocvich did not reveal in speeches throughout the region that many of those targeted by persecution in Poltavskaia had their family members and friends deported or shot including in years before the supposed Omel'chenko crisis even started. Ultimately due to being perceived as the most rebellious area almost all (or 12,000) members of the Poltavskaia stantisa were deported to the north. This coincided with and was a part of a wider deportation of 46,000 cossacks from Kuban.

Likely in connection to the affairs in Poltavskaia Ukrainization was officially reversed in a decree on 26 December 1932 in which there was a two week deadline to transfer all publishing and paperwork in the region to Russian, and the Ukrainian language was effectively banned in Kuban until 1991. A representative of the Ukrainian state publishing house claimed 1,500 Ukrainian teachers in the Kuban were either deported or killed though number has not been verified. The professional Ukrainian theatre in Krasnodar was closed. All Ukrainian toponyms in the Kuban, which reflected the areas from which the first Ukrainians settlers had moved, were changed. The names of Stanytsias such as the rural town of Kyiv, in Krasnodar, was changed to "Krasnoartilyevskaya", and Uman to "Leningrad", and Poltavska to "Krasnoarmieiskaya". Russification, the Holodomor of 1932–1933 and other tactics used by the Union government led to a catastrophic fall in the population that self-identified as being Ukrainian in the Kuban. Official Soviet Union statistics of 1959 state that Ukrainians made up 4% of the population, in 1989 – 3%. The self-identified Ukrainian population of Kuban decreased from 915,000 in 1926, to 150,000 in 1939. and to 61,867 in 2002.

=== Ukrainian demographics ===
- 1792–93 – 25,000 settled from Ukraine territories (first wave)
- 1806–09 – 562 Danube Cossacks were resettled to the Kuban
- 1810 – 562 former Zaporozhian Cossacks were resettled from Bessarabia
- 1809–11 – 41,635 people from Poltava and Chernihiv regions (Second wave)
- 1820–25 – 59,455 people from Kharkiv, Poltava and Chernihiv regions (3rd wave)
- 1848–49 – 11,949 people Kharkiv, Poltava and Chernihiv regions (4th wave)
- From 1792 to 1850 over 105 thousand people resettled to the Kuban from central Ukrainian territories.
- The final major resettlement from Ukraine took place in 1862–66 with 1142 people.

In the census for 1926-7 there were 1,222,140 Ukrainians in the Kuban region, who made up 55% of the population of the area.

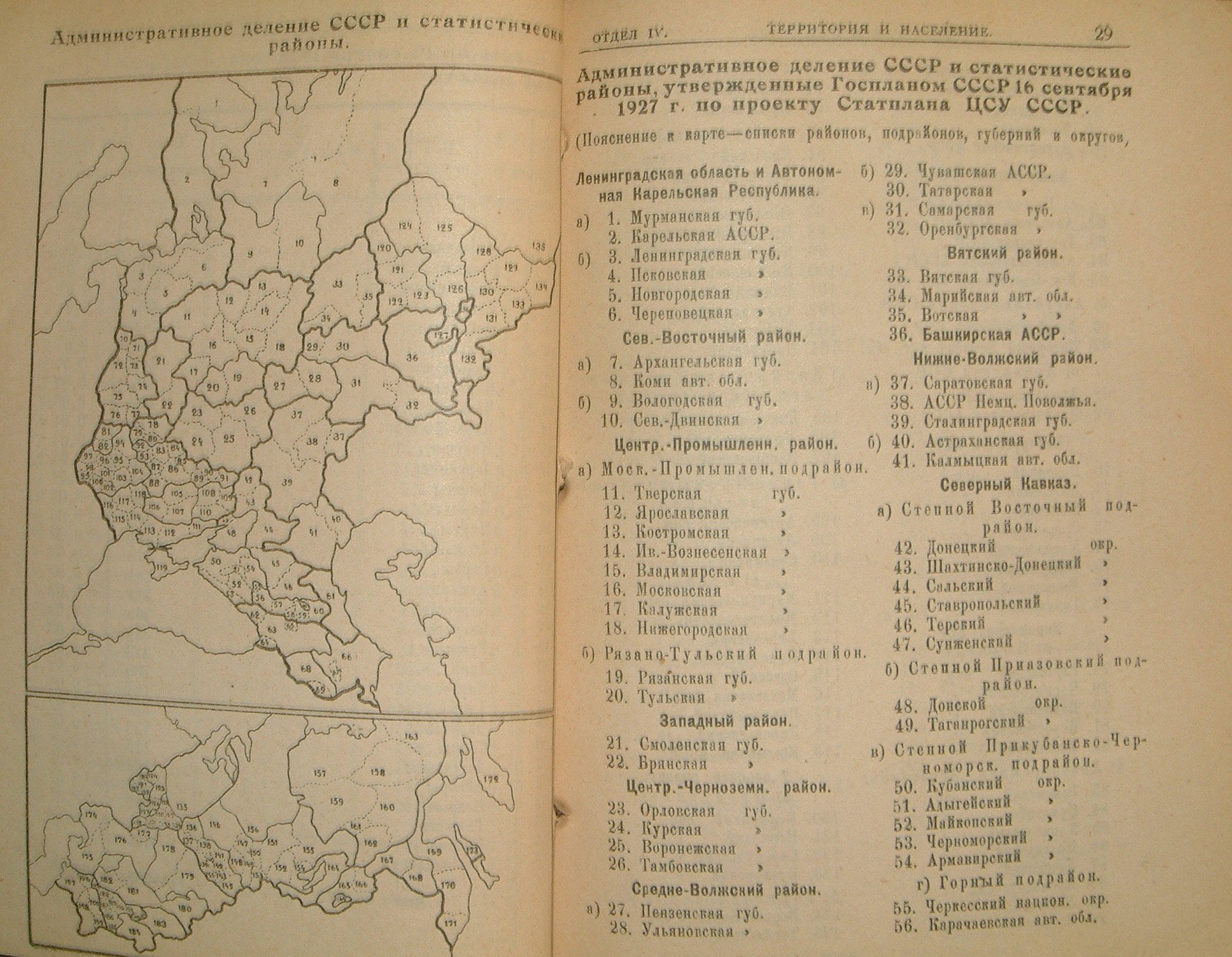
Mapping of USSR 1926 Census including the Kuban region

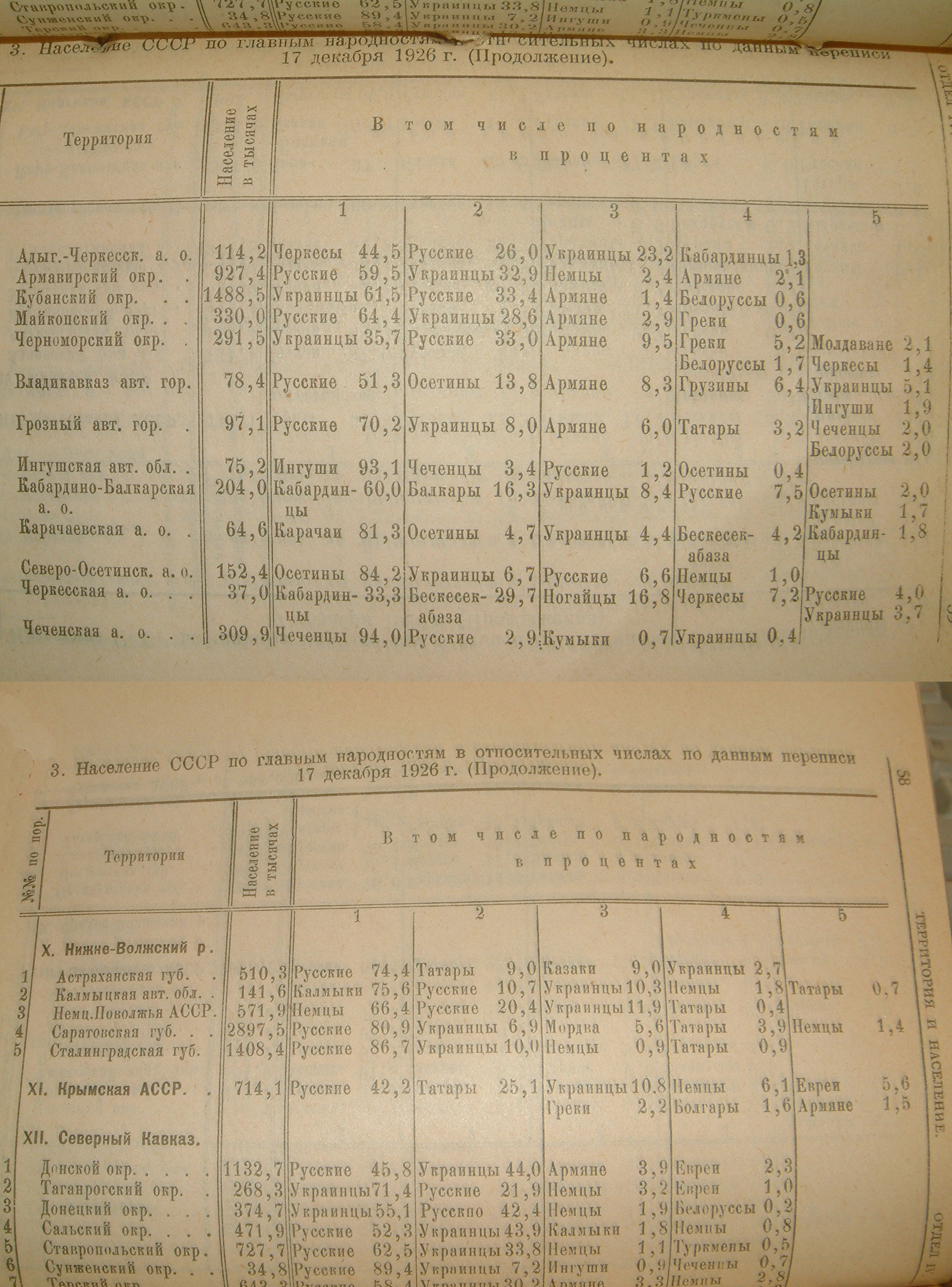
USSR Census 1926: Major nationalities of the Kuban region

=== Russian census figures ===
The 1897 census combined both the Russian and Ukrainian population together. Together they made up 97.64% of the population. The number of Ukrainian language speakers was 859,122 (49.1%). The number of Russian language speakers was 732,283. (41.1%). The ethnographer Pavlo Chubynsky stated that the number of Ukrainians in the Kuban was understated and that 60% of those who put down Russian as their language were of Ukrainian ethnicity. The ethnographer and statistician O. Rusov also noted a similar number in his writings.

In the census for 1926 it was noted that there was a total population in the Kuban region of 3,343,893 of which 1,644.518 (49.2%) stated that they were Ukrainian, and 1,428,587 (42.7%) stated they were Russian. Other figures from the same census state that Ukrainian speakers made up 55% of the population of the area. In the 2002 Russian census it states that only 2% of the population speak Ukrainian and only 0.9% have been marked as being ethnically Ukrainian.

== Ukrainian culture in the Kuban ==
=== Ukrainian language ===
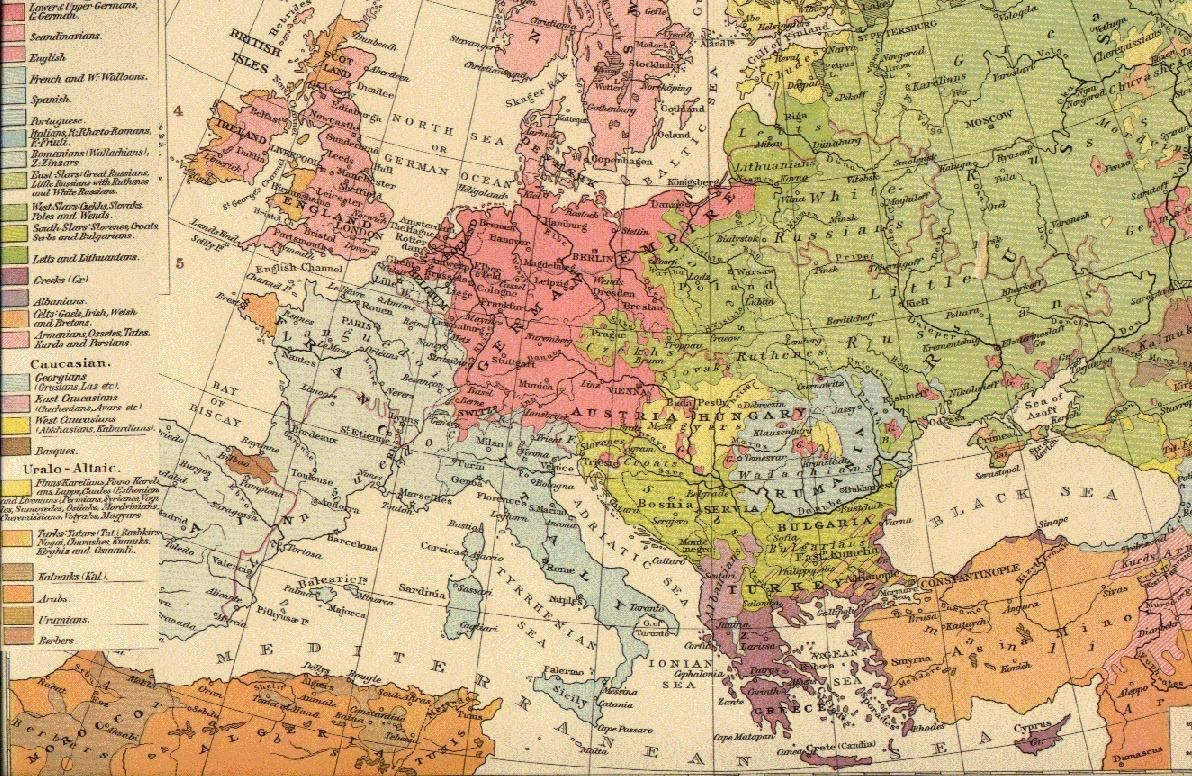
Ethnographic map of Europe (1896) published in the Times Atlas

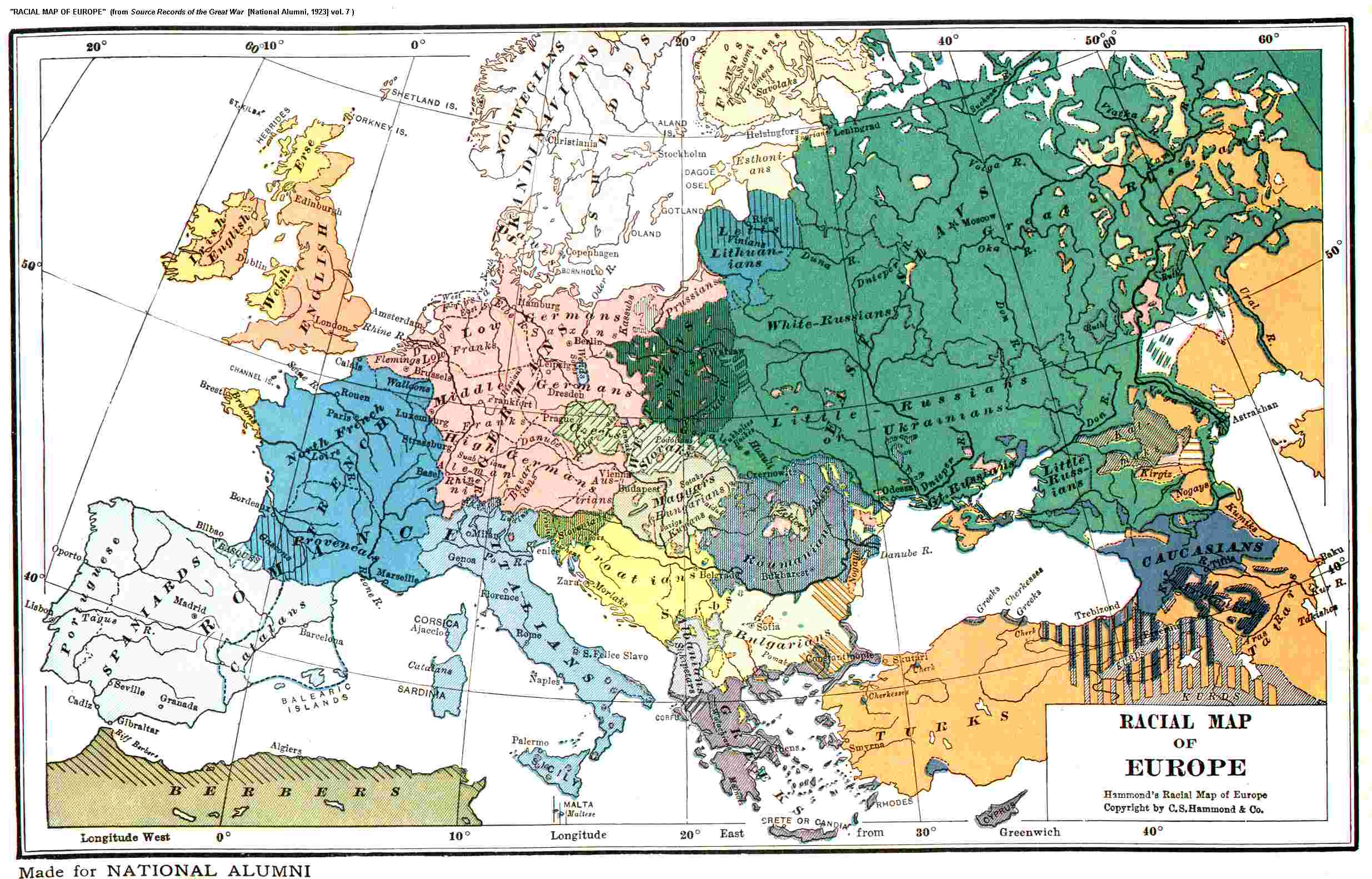
Ethnographic map of Europe (1923) by C.S. Hammond. The Ukrainians have been designated "Little Russians"

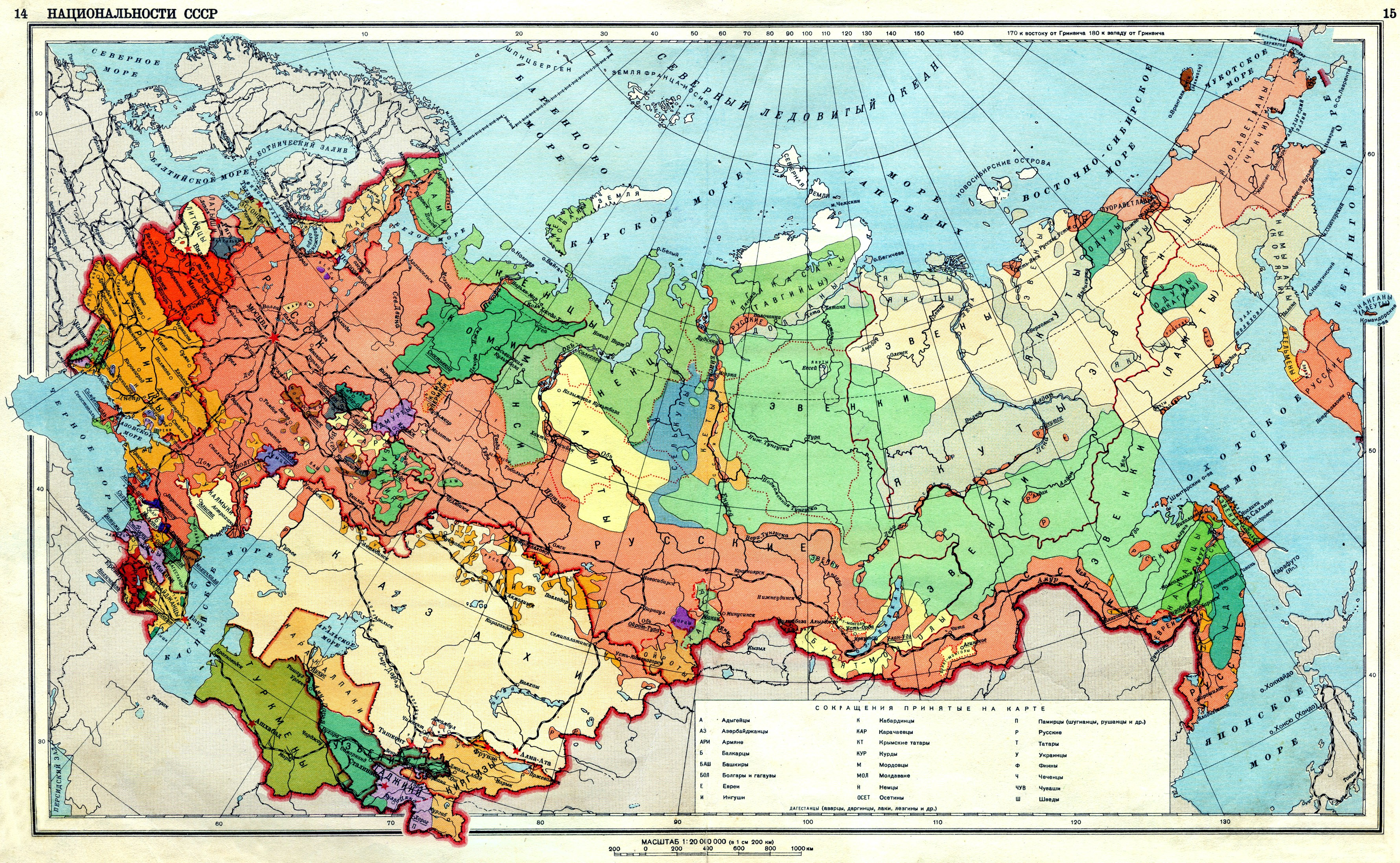
Ethnographic map of the Soviet Union (1941)

The rise of a Ukrainian self-awareness produced an anti-Ukrainian sentiment within some layers of the Russian empire. To curtail this movement, the use of Ukrainian (Little Russian) language within the Russian empire was initially restricted by the Valuev Circular and later banned completely by the Ems ukaz. Some restrictions were relaxed in 1905 and others ceased to be policed for a short period of time after the Revolution in 1917.

In Kuban, with the repealing of formal restrictions by the Russian government on the use of Ukrainian language, the official use of the Ukrainian language began to blossom. During the brief period of Kuban independence some 1391 beginning school, 180 middle schools, 151 high schools, 2 seminaries 124 professional tertiary establishments included education in the Ukrainian language.

By 1922 there were 33 schools that taught primarily in the Ukrainian language.

In 1927 there were 746 Ukrainian language schools. Ukrainian textbooks began to be published in Krasnodar in 1926 with the crossing over of most institutes of higher learning to Ukrainian language instruction.

In 1920 in Krasnodar the first Institute of Folk Education (later renamed the Krasnodar Pedagogical Institute) was established. To better serve the local population, the medical institute was also Ukrainianised. A teachers' college for the preparation of Ukrainian language teachers was also opened in 1922.

By 1927 there were 6 Institutes of higher learning that taught in Ukrainian.

Мost Ukrainians speakers speak a Ukrainian dialect, which differs only slightly from standard literary Ukrainian.

=== Local Publishing ===
The sending of Ukrainian language publications to Kuban had been kept in check by the Russian post office. It wasn't until 1923 that people in the Kuban could subscribe to a Ukrainian language newspaper from Ukraine.

In 1921 the first Ukrainian language magazine “Zoria” was published. Ukrainian language newspapers such as “Novy shliakh”, “Chornomorets”, “Chornomorsky krai” were soon established. In the 1920s close to 150 Ukrainian language writers lived in Kuban. All were repressed after 1932 either being shot or exiled.

=== Ukrainian music of the Kuban ===
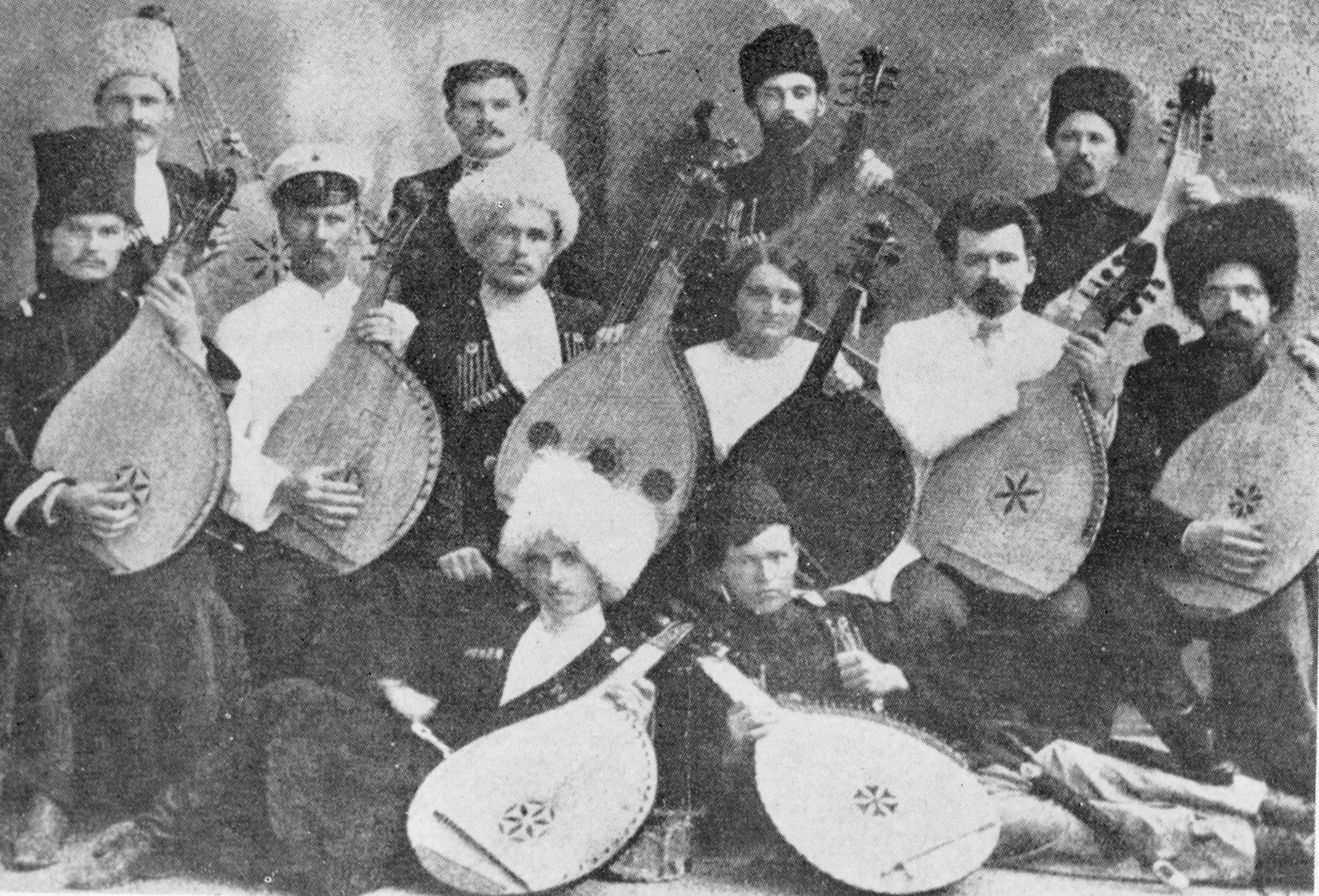
The first bandura school in 1913 directed by Vasyl Yemetz (centre)

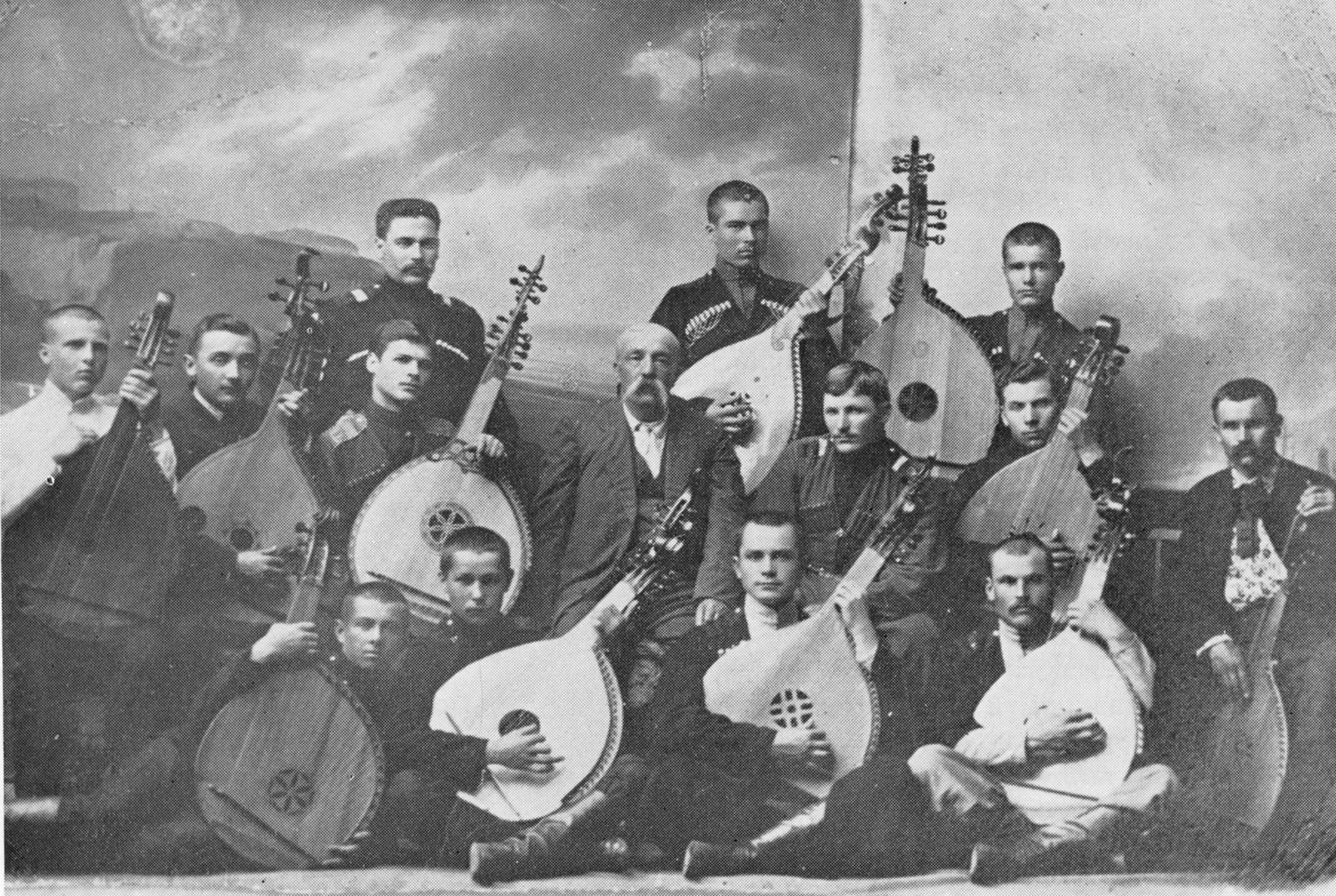
The second summer bandura school in Yekaterynodar 1914. Mykola Bohuslavsky in the centre

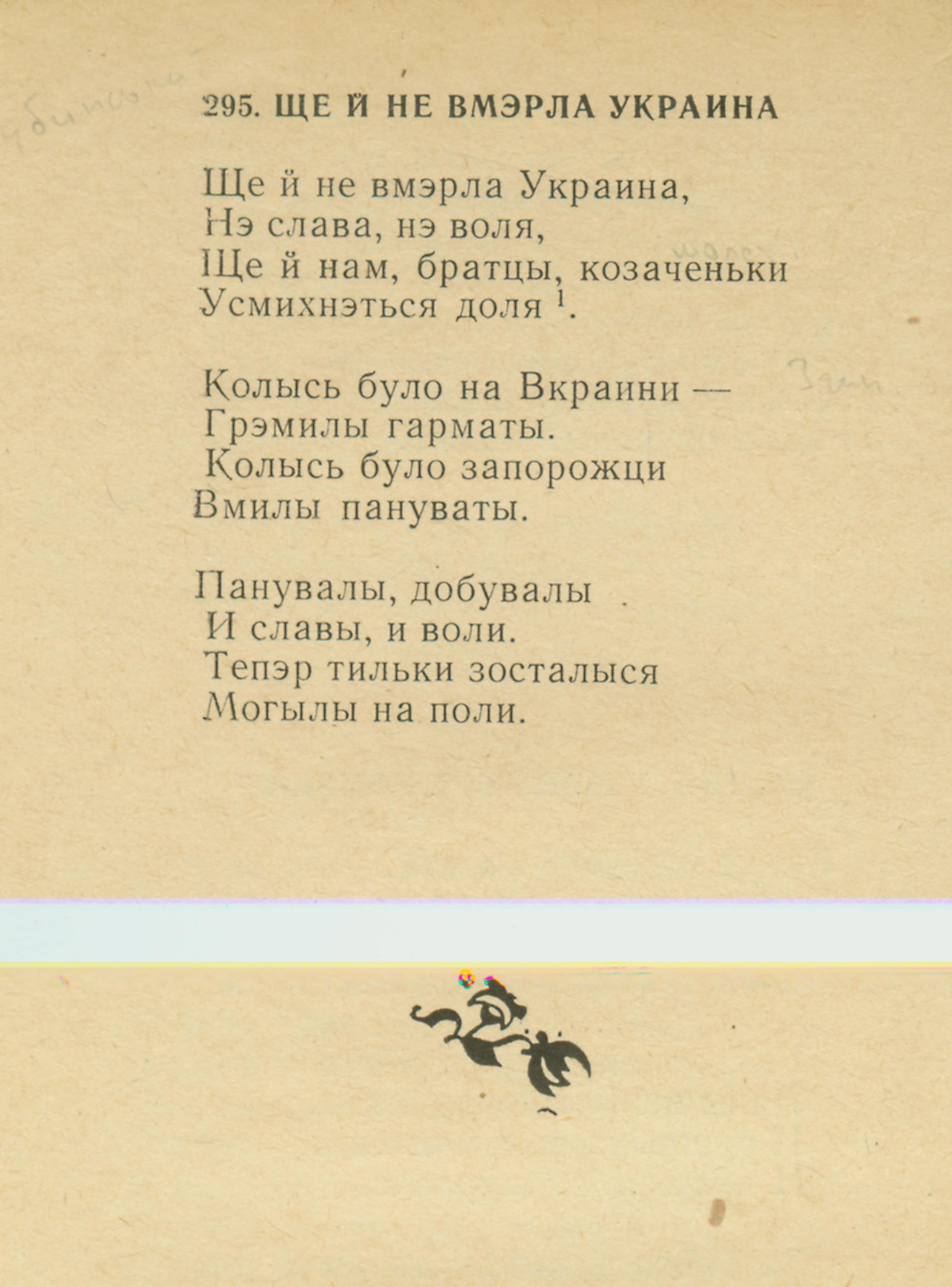
One of the Ukrainian songs (Shche ne vmerla Ukraina) published in a collection of Kuban Cossack songs in 1968.

Music was one of the most important loves of the Ukrainians in Kuban. There are many Ukrainian folk songs sung in the Kuban region. Many of the songs are about Cossack heroes from Ukraine such as Morozenko, Baida (Cossack), Doroshenko, Sahaidachny, Bohdan Khmelnytsky, Maksym Kryvonis, and Danylo Nechay. A characteristic of Ukrainian folk songs of Kuban is the replacement of particular words to better reflect the local history and conditions. Where the word "Dunai" (the Danube) is used as a generic word for river, it is replaced by the word Kuban. Particularly popular are songs by the Sich Riflemen from Galicia, composed in the early 20th century, which juxtapose the word "rifleman" (Strilets) with the word "Cossack" (Kozak).

In 1886 A. Bihdai published 14 books containing 556 Ukrainian folk songs. A similar publication named Malorusski pesni (Little-Russian (Ukrainian) songs) containing over 200 Ukrainian folk songs was collected by H. Kontsevych from singers of the Kuban Army choir. Close to 3,000 Ukrainian folk songs were recorded in Kuban by Oleksander Koshetz, who spent 3 years collecting materials.

In 1966 a collection of songs of the Kuban Cossacks published in Krasnodar included the text of "Shche ne vmerla Ukraina", the Ukrainian National Anthem, which at that time was banned in Ukraine.

In the early 20th century a significant movement was organised for the support of people learning to play the Ukrainian folk instrument known as the bandura. The bandura movement became quite significant until it was repressed in the 1930s. A number of Kuban bandurists were founding members of the first professional bandurist capella organized in Kyiv in 1918 under Vasyl Yemetz. Kuban bandurists were also prominent in the formation of the second bandurist capella in Prague in 1923.

In recent times there has been a revival in the singing of Ukrainian folk songs led by the Kuban Cossack Choir and its director, Viktor Zakharchenko. In a concert at the Ukraina Palace in Kyiv in 1990, the Kuban Cossack Choir was the first to sing the Ukrainian National Anthem, which they announced as a Kuban folk song. Ukrainian folk instruments are no longer officially banned and are returning to use, being taught at the Krasnodar Music college.

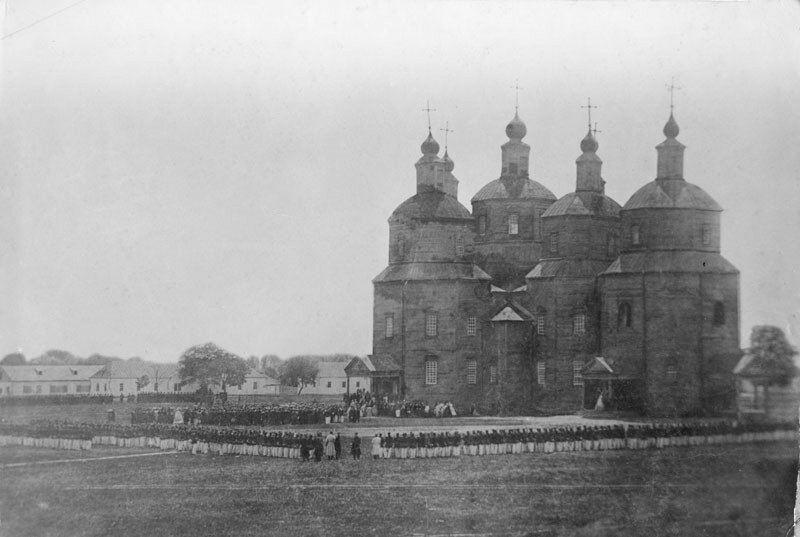
Church of the Resurrection of Christ, Yekaterinodar (1864)

=== Ukrainian architecture in Kuban ===
Numerous wooden and stone churches in Ukrainian Baroque style were constructed in the Kuban region following the start of Black Sea Cossack settlement in 1792. Many of them were designed following prototypes from Sloboda Ukraine. None of the churches in Ukrainian style have been preserved to our day, with the last remaining ones being demolished by Soviet authorities following the 1932-1933 Holodomor famine.

== Prominent Ukrainians from Kuban ==
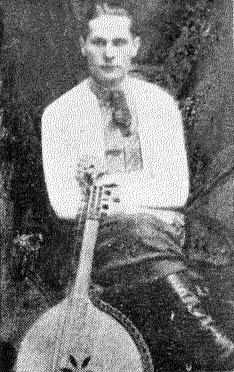
Bandurist Mykhailo Teliha c. 1923

- Mykhailo Teliha – bandurist
- Anton Chorny – bandurist
- Fedir Shcherbyna – historian
- Mykola Riabovol – politician
- Vasyl Ivanys – Otoman, historian
- Hryhory Kontsevych – Composer, conductor
- Yakiv Kukharenko – Historian, ethnographer, otaman of the Kuban Cossack Army
- Viktor Zakharchenko – Artistic director of the Kuban Cossack Choir
- Yuri Bulavin – bandurist, concertmaster of the Kuban Cossack Choir

== Prominent Ukrainians associated with the Kuban ==
- Vasyl Yemetz – bandurist
- Mykola Mikhnovsky – historian, lawyer
- Symon Petliura – politician, journalist, military leader
- Hnat Khotkevych – writer, composer, bandurist
- Oleksander Koshetz – Composer, conductor
- Antin Holovaty – Cossack politician, bandurist
- Mykhailo Hrushevskyi – politician, historian, ethnographer

== See also ==
- Ukrainians in Siberia
- Balachka – Ukrainian Cossack dialect

== Sources ==
- Українське козацтво – Енциклопедія – Kyiv, 2006.
- Serhiy Z. Zaremba. З національно-культурного життя українців на Кубані (20-30-і роки ХХ ст.). Київська старовина – 1993 #1, с. 94–104.
- Evhen D. Petrenko. Українське козацтво. Київська старовина – 1993 #1, с. 114–119.
- Renat Pol'ovyy. Кубанська Україна. К. Дiокор 2003.
- Valeriy N. Ratushnyak. Очерки истории Кубани с древнейших времен по 1920 г. – Krasnodar, 1996.
- Volodymyr I. Serhiychuk. Українізація Росії. К. 2000.
