= Ukrainians in Siberia =

Siberian Ukrainians Сибірські Українці Сибирские Украинцы
Total population
- Unknown

Regions with significant populations
- Norilsk, Magadan, Yakutia, Amur Oblast, Tyumen Oblast, Far North, Far East

Languages
- Russian, Ukrainian, Surzhyk

Religion
- Eastern Orthodox, Old Believers

Related ethnic groups
- Ukrainians, Russians, other East Slavs

Siberian Ukrainians (Ukrainian: Сибірські Українці, romanized: Sybirski Ukrayintsi; Russian: Сибирские Украинцы, romanized: Sibirskiye Ukraintsy) form a national minority in Siberia and the Russian Far East, but make up the majority in some cities there. Siberian Ukrainians, one of the largest and historically important constituent parts of the Ukrainian diaspora, represent one of the first Ukrainian diasporas.

== History ==
=== Russian Empire ===
Two million Ukrainian peasants settled in Siberia between the 1600s and 1917. In the 19th century, the government of Russia encouraged peasants to move from the western parts of the empire to Siberia. Ukrainian peasants, not as burdened by the traditional Russian communal system of agriculture as the Russian peasants had been, seemed ideal candidates for resettlement, often more willing to go in return for the promise of more land. The literacy societies were among the few public service organizations in Tsarist Russia. The Khar’khov Society, while Russian-speaking, included many Ukrainians and was among the most active of such societies.

=== Soviet era ===
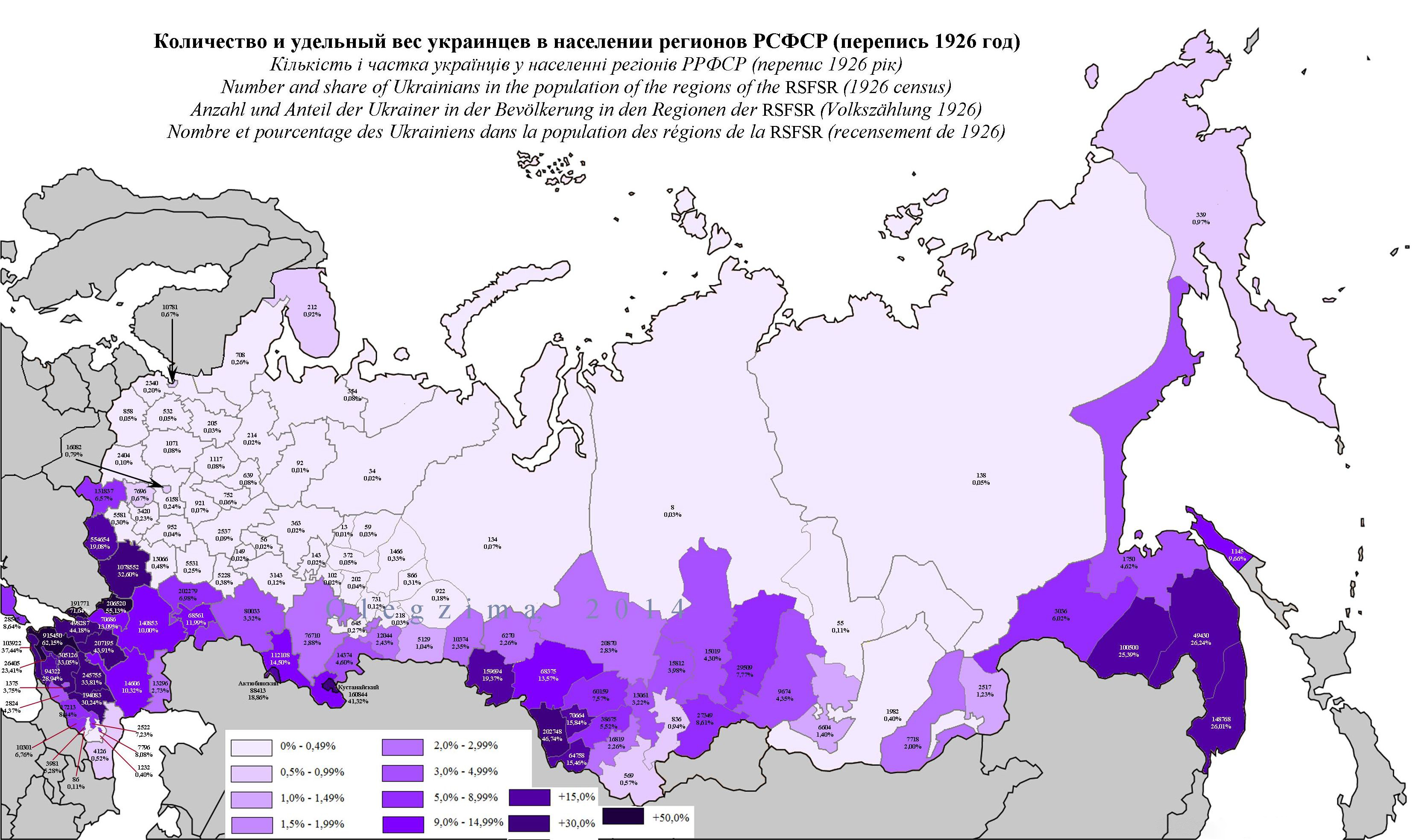
Number and share of Ukrainians in the population of the regions of the RSFSR (1926 census)

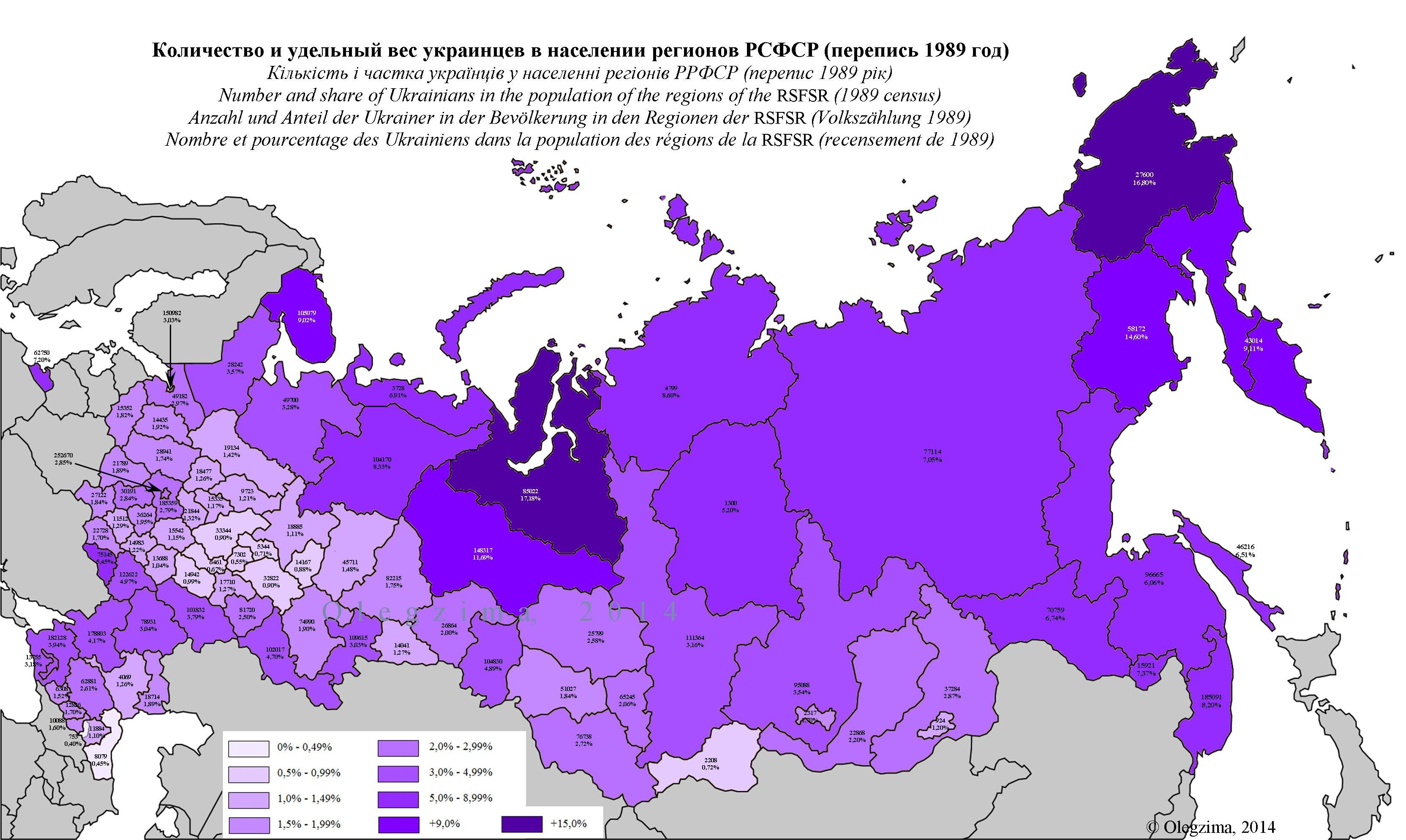
Number and share of Ukrainians in the population of the regions of the RSFSR (1989 census)

=== Dekulakization ===
Dekulakization played an important role in promoting Ukrainian migration to Siberia. Under Stalin's leadership, Ukrainians would forcefully be relocated to Siberian regions in both the Russian SR and Kazakhstan/kazach SR. During the Holodomor roughly 300,000 Ukrainians which is equivalent to 10 percent of Ukraine population in 1932-1933 were relocated across the USSR. 160,000-200,000 would be forcibly relocated to Siberian regions.

==== World War II refugees ====
During Operation Barbarossa evacuations commenced of Russian, Belarusian and Ukrainian civilians from Europe over the Ural Mountains. These evacuees included skilled Russian and Jewish workers and professionals as well as nationally conscious members of the Ukrainian clergy and intelligentsia. The Soviets feared that the Nazis would exploit the ethno-national detachment of the educated and many were prohibited from returning to Ukraine after the war.

==== Gulag ====
During the Stalin era, and especially after World War II many Ukrainians were sent to Gulag; some of them were former participants of the Ukrainian Insurgent Army. Ukrainians contributed to the Norilsk Uprising and other gulag uprisings in 1953. Many (but not all) Ukrainians living in Siberia and Russia are the descendants of prisoners.

=== Modern Russia ===
After the collapse of the Soviet Union many Ukrainians chose to stay in Siberia, unlike many other nationalities. That combined with natural growth caused their share of the population to increase. However overall the population numbers declined due to assimilation.

=== Post Maidan Events ===
==== Ukrainian exodus ====
In mid-2014, trains began to arrive in Siberia carrying Ukrainian refugees. Many refugees and immigrants were welcomed by Siberian natives and many settled in predominantly indigenous areas.

Many however, were unaware of their location upon their arrival, in one case, immigrants from Ukraine arriving in Magadan walked out of the plane confused - asking reporters where they were. Analysts assume Ukrainians are arriving in depopulated areas (i.e. Igarka) for the purpose of repopulation.

== Areas of settlement ==
- Green Ukraine
- Grey Ukraine
- Norilsk

== Population ==
Large numbers of people with full or partial Ukrainian descent were born in Siberia and live there. Large numbers of immigrants also live in Siberia, while another large group includes illegal immigrants.

== Notable Siberian Ukrainians ==
- Gennady Alferenko
- Anatoly Babko
- Valeria Ivanenko
- Tina Karol
- Vitali Kischenko
- Ilya Lagutenko
- Petro Oliynik
- Oleksandr Opanasenko
- Anastasia Prokopenko
- Oleg Sukhoruchenko
- Vladimir Tatarchuk
- Vitaly Teslenko
- Nikolai Usenko
- Aleksey Yakimenko
- Dmitri Yaroshenko
- Kostyantyn Zhevago
- Alexander Shlemenko

== Ukrainian Culture in Siberia ==
There are several Ukrainian Language Newspapers in Siberia, as well as privately funded Ukrainian language schools. The Ukrainian Catholic Church has Branches in many Siberian towns and villages that serve the immigrants from Western Ukraine.

== See also ==
- Ukrainians in Kuban
- Ukrainians in Russia
- Ukrainian diaspora

== Literature ==
Zavialov, A. (2024) Ukrainian Catastrophe: Ukrainians and the Ukrainian Language in Russia in the Mirror of 1989-2021 Russian Censuses
