= Ukrainian diaspora =

Scattered global community of ethnic Ukrainians

Map of the Ukrainian diaspora in the world. Ukraine + 1,000,000 + 100,000 + 10,000 + 1,000

The Ukrainian diaspora comprises Ukrainians and people of Ukrainian descent living outside Ukraine. It developed through several major waves of migration, beginning with large-scale emigration in the late 19th and early 20th centuries. Later waves followed the political upheavals and wars of the 20th century, the post-war period, and the dissolution of the Soviet Union and Ukrainian independence in 1991. Migration caused by the Russo-Ukrainian War since 2014, and especially the full-scale Russian invasion beginning in 2022, has been described as a further major wave of Ukrainian emigration.

Ukrainian communities are found throughout the former Soviet Union, Europe, North America and South America. Long-established diasporas developed in the former Soviet states and the Americas, while migration since the 1990s created large communities in Central and Western Europe. The 2022 invasion caused mass displacement and greatly increased the Ukrainian population abroad. In June 2026, 4.41 million people who had fled Ukraine were under temporary protection in the European Union, with Germany, Poland and Czechia hosting the largest numbers.

== Distribution ==
The Ukrainian diaspora is found throughout numerous countries worldwide. It is particularly concentrated in other post-Soviet states (Belarus, Kazakhstan, Moldova, and Russia), Central Europe (the Czech Republic, Germany, and Poland), North America (Canada and the United States), and South America (Argentina and Brazil).

== History ==
=== 1608 to 1880 ===
After the loss suffered by the Cossack-Swedish Alliance under Ivan Mazepa in the Battle of Poltava in 1709, some political emigrants, primarily Cossacks, settled in Turkey and in Western Europe.

In 1775, after the fall of the Zaporozhian Sich to the Russian Empire, some more Cossacks emigrated to Dobruja in the Ottoman Empire (now in Romania), while others settled in Volga and Ural regions of the Russian Empire.

In the second half of the 18th century, Ukrainians from the Transcarpathian Region formed agricultural settlements in the Kingdom of Hungary, primarily in the Bačka and Syrmia regions. Both are now located in the Vojvodina Region of the Republic of Serbia.

In time, Ukrainian settlements emerged in the major European capitals, including Vienna, Budapest, Rome and Warsaw.

=== 1880–1920 ===
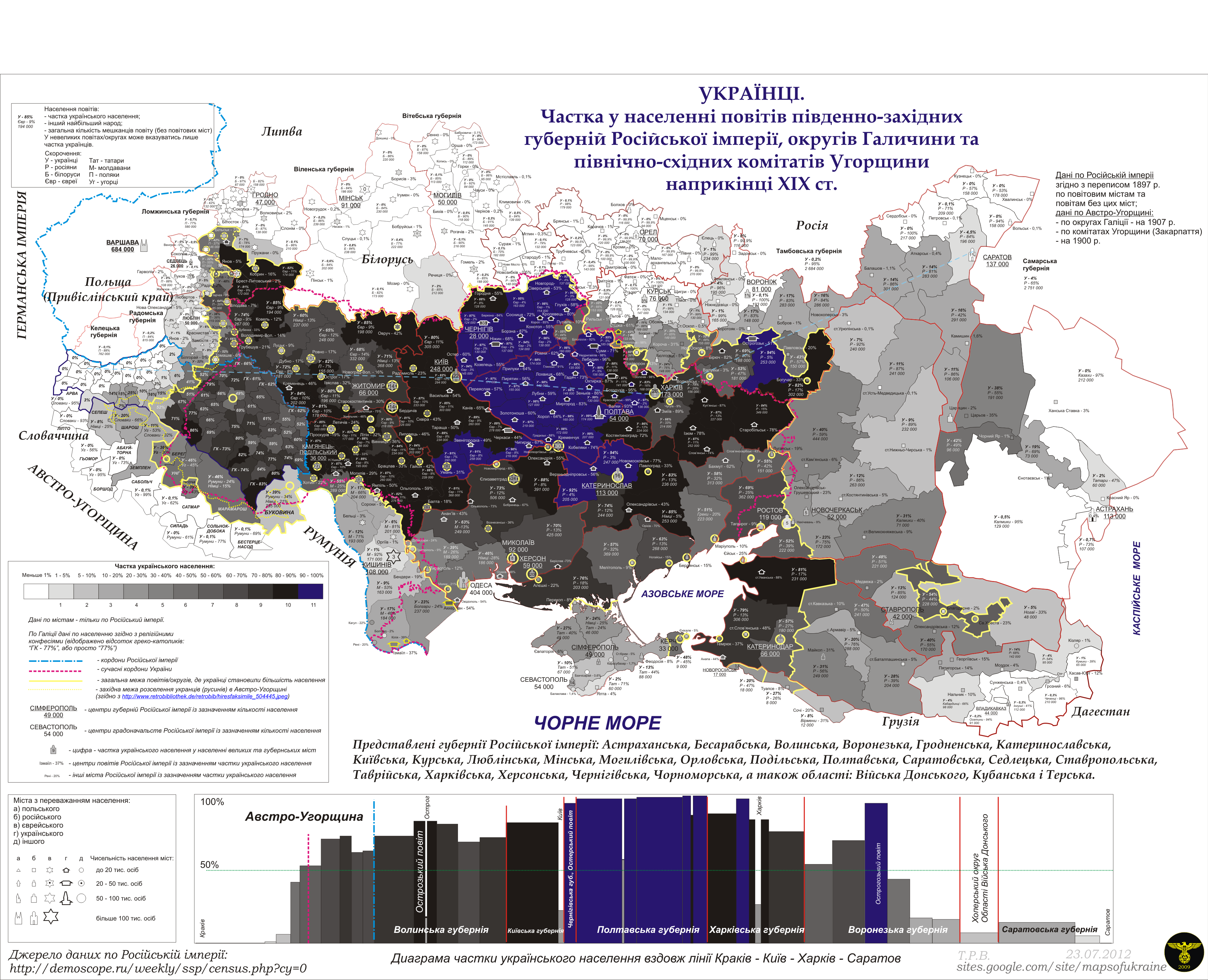
Share of Ukrainians by poviats of the Russian Empire, districts and counties of Austria-Hungary at the end of the 19th century

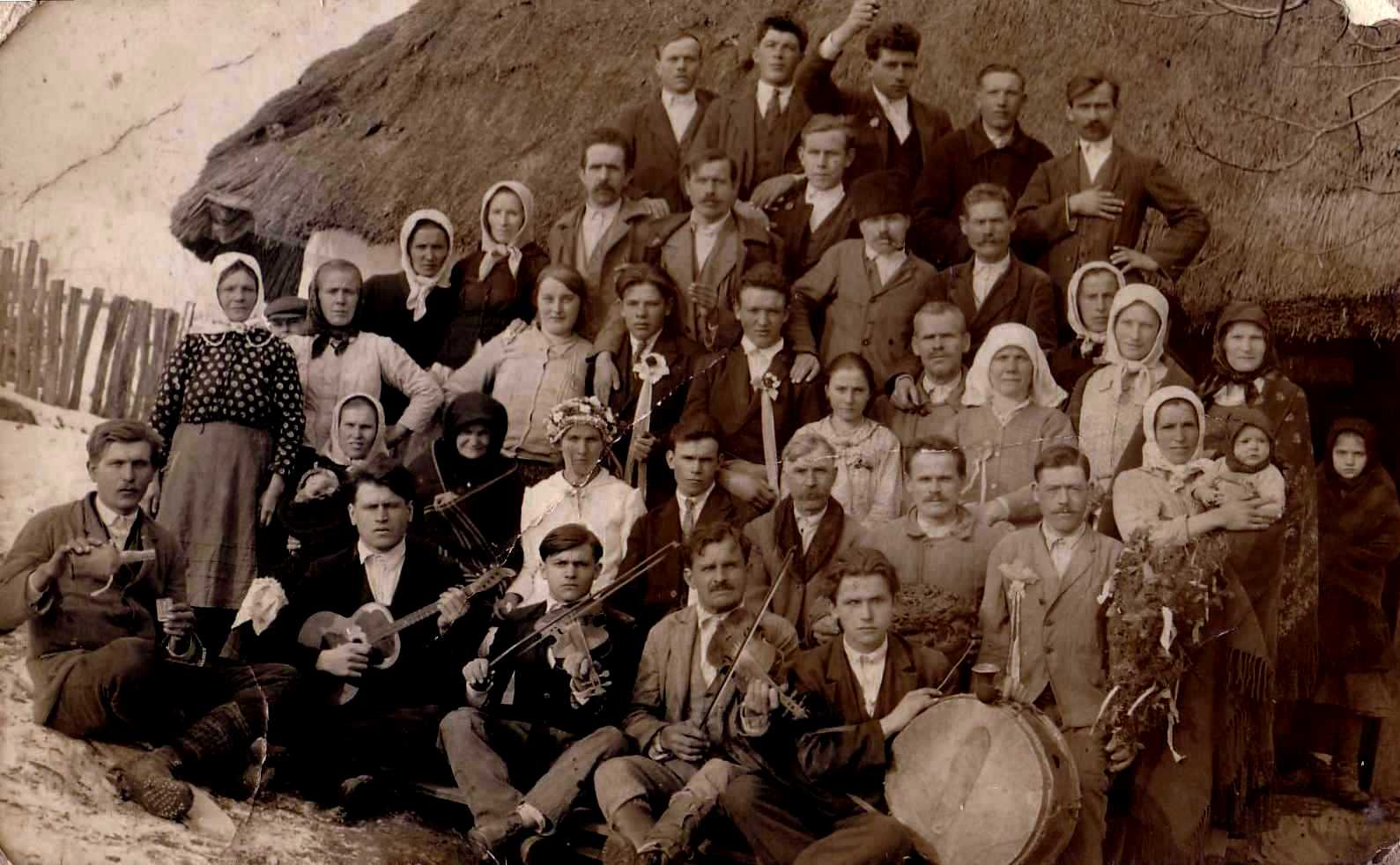
Ukrainians in Austro-Hungarian Monarchy 1890, modern Prnjavor, Bosnia and Herzegovina.

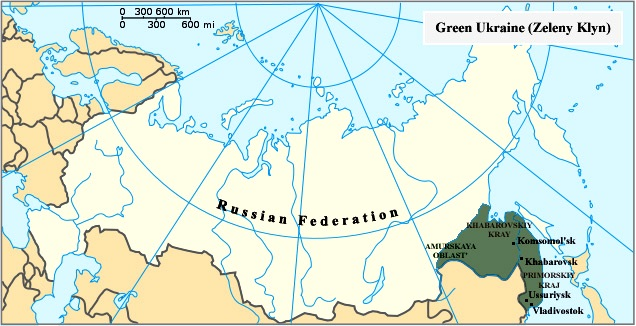
Green Ukraine – Ukrainian historical name of the land in the Russian Far East area.

In 1880, the Ukrainian diaspora consisted of approximately 1.2 million people, which represented approximately 4.6% of all Ukrainians, and was distributed as follows:

- 0.7 million in the European part of the Russian Empire
- 0.2 million in Austro-Hungary
- 0.1 million in the Asian part of the Russian Empire
- 0.1 million in the United States

In the last quarter of the 19th century due to the agrarian resettlement, a massive emigration of Ukrainians from Austro-Hungary to the Americas and from the Russian Empire to the Urals and Asia (Siberia and Kazakhstan) occurred.

A secondary movement was the emigration under the auspices of the Austro-Hungarian government of 10,000 Ukrainians from Galicia to Bosnia.

Furthermore, due to Russian agitation, 15,000 Ukrainians left Galicia and Bukovina and settled in Russia. Most of these settlers later returned.

Finally in the Russian Empire, some Ukrainians from the Chełm and Podlaskie regions, as well as most of the Jews, emigrated to the Americas.

Some of those who left their homeland returned. For example, from the 393,000 Ukrainians who emigrated to the United States, 70,000 returned.

Most of the emigrants to the US worked in the construction and mining industries. Many worked in the US on a temporary basis to earn remittances.

In the 1890s, Ukrainian agricultural settlers emigrated first to Brazil and Argentina. However, the writings of Galician professor and nationalist Dr Joseph Oleskiw were influential in redirecting that flow to Canada. He visited an already-established Ukrainian block settlement, which had been founded by Iwan Pylypiw, and met with Canadian immigration officials. His two pamphlets on the subject praised the United States as a place for wage labour, but stated that Canada was the best place for agricultural settlers to obtain free land. By contrast he was fiercely critical of the treatment Ukrainian settlers had received in South America. After his writings, the slow trickle of Ukrainians to Canada greatly increased.

Before the start of the First World War, almost 500,000 Ukrainians emigrated to the Americas. This can be broken down by country as follows:

- to the United States: almost 350,000
- to Canada: almost 100,000
- to Brazil and Argentina: almost 50,000

In 1914, the Ukrainian diaspora in the Americas numbered about 700,000-750,000 people:

- 500,000-550,000 in the US
- almost 100,000 in Canada
- approximately 50,000 in Brazil
- 50,000 in Argentina

Most of the emigrants to the Americas belonged to the Greek Catholic Church. This led to the creation of Greek Catholic bishops in Canada and the US. The need for solidarity led to the creation of Ukrainian religious, political, and social organisations. These new Ukrainian organisations maintained links with the homeland, from which books, media, priests, cultural figures, and new ideas arrived. Furthermore, local influence, as well as influence from their homeland, led to the process of a national re-awakening. At times, the diaspora was ahead of their time in this re-awakening.

Emigrants from the Transcarpathian and Lemko regions created their own organisations and had their own separate Greek Catholic church hierarchy (the Ruthenian Catholic Church). These emigrants are often considered to be Rusyns or Ruthenians and are considered by some to be distinct from other Ukrainians. However, in Argentina and Brazil, immigrants from Transcarpathia and the Lemko Region did identify themselves as Ukrainians.

The majority of the Ukrainian diaspora in the Americas focused on obtaining independence and convincing outside powers to join its war against the Soviets. The two nationalist governments which existed simultaneously; The Ukrainian People’s Republic, and The West Ukrainian People’s Republic (whose more progressive government was exiled by the former) both sent delegates to the 1919 Paris Peace Conference. An interesting note is the role the Ruthenians played to convince the American government about the inclusion of the Transcarpathian region into the Czechoslovak Republic in 1919.

In contrast, the Ukrainian diaspora in the Russian Empire, and especially in Asia, was primarily agrarian. After 1860, the diaspora was primarily located in the Volga and Ural Regions, while in the last quarter of that century, due to a lack of space for settlement, the diaspora expanded into Western Siberia, Turkestan, the Far East, and even into the Zeleny Klyn. In the 1897 census there were 1,560,000 Ukrainians divided as follows:

- In the European part of the empire: 1,232,000
  - In the Volga and Urals: 393,000
  - In the non-Ukrainian (ethnographically speaking) parts of Kursk and Voronezh Regions: 232,000
  - Almost 150,000 in Bessarabia.
- In the Asian part of the empire: 311,000
  - In the Caucasus region: 117,000

In the next few decades, Ukrainian emigration to Asia increased (almost 1.5 million Ukrainians emigrated), leading to almost 2 million Ukrainians in the Asian part of the Russian Empire by 1914. Consequently, the Russian Empire had approximately 3.4 million Ukrainians. Most of this population was assimilated due to a lack of national awareness and closeness with the local Russian population, especially in religion.

Unlike the emigrants from Austro-Hungary, the Ukrainian emigrants in the Russian Empire did not create their own organisations nor were there many interactions with their homeland. The revolution of 1917 allowed the creation of Ukrainian organisations, which were linked with the national and political rebirth in Ukraine.

=== 1920–1945 ===
==== First major political emigration ====
The First World War and the Russian Civil War led to the first massive political emigration, which strengthened the existing Ukrainian communities by infusing them with members from various political, scientific, and cultural backgrounds. Furthermore, some of these new emigrants formed Ukrainian communities in Western and Central Europe. Thus, new communities were created in Czechoslovakia, Germany, Poland, France, Belgium, Austria, Romania, and Yugoslavia. The largest was in Prague, which was considered one of the centres of Ukrainian culture and political life (after Lviv and Kraków).

This group of emigrants created many different organisations and movements associated with corresponding groups in the battle for independence. A few Ukrainian universities were founded. Furthermore, many of these organisations were associated with the exiled Ukrainian government, the Ukrainian People's Republic.

During the 1920s, the new diaspora maintained links with now-Soviet Ukraine. A Sovietophile movement appeared, whereby former opponents of the Bolsheviks began to argue that Ukrainians should support Soviet Ukraine. Some argued that they should do so because the Soviet republics were the leaders of international revolution, while others claimed that the Bolsheviks' social and national policies benefited Ukraine. This movement included Mykhailo Hrushevskyi, Volodymyr Vynnychenko and Yevhen Petrushevych. Many émigrés, including Hrushevskyi, returned and helped the Bolsheviks implement their policy of Ukrainianisation. However, the abandonment of Ukrainianisation, the return to collectivisation, and the man-made famine of 1932–33 ended Ukrainianisation. Most of the links were broken, with the exception of some Sovietophile organisations in Canada and the United States.

On the other hand, the Canadian and American diaspora maintained links with the Ukrainian community in Galicia and the Transcarpathian Region.

The political emigration decreased in the mid-1920s due to a return to Soviet Ukraine and a decline in students studying at the Ukrainian universities established outside of Ukraine.

==== Economic emigration ====
In 1920 and 1921, many Ukrainians left Western Ukraine to settle in the Americas and Western Europe. Most of the emigrates settled in Argentina, Brazil, Uruguay, Paraguay, France, the UK and Belgium. The economic crisis of the early 1930s stopped most of this emigration. The emigration picked up again later in the decade. The number of emigrants can be approximated as:

- to Canada: almost 70,000 Ukrainians;
- to Argentina: 50,000 Ukrainians;
- to France: 35,000 Ukrainians;
- to the United States: 15,000 Ukrainians;
- to Brazil: 10,000 Ukrainians;
- to Paraguay and Uruguay: a couple of thousand Ukrainians.

Furthermore, many Ukrainians left the Ukrainian SSR and settled in Asia due to political and economic factors, primarily collectivisation and the famine of the 1930s.

==== Size ====
The Ukrainian diaspora, outside of the Soviet Union, was 1.7-1.8 million people:

- In the Americas:
  - In the United States: 700–800,000 Ukrainians
  - In Canada: 250,000 Ukrainians
  - In Argentina: 220,000 Ukrainians
  - In Brazil: 80,000 Ukrainians
- In Western and Central Europe:
  - In Moldova: approximately 360,000 Ukrainians
  - In Poland: 100,000 Ukrainians
  - In France: 40,000 Ukrainians
  - In Yugoslavia: 40,000 Ukrainians
  - In Czechoslovakia: 35,000 Ukrainians
  - In other countries: 15–20,000 Ukrainians

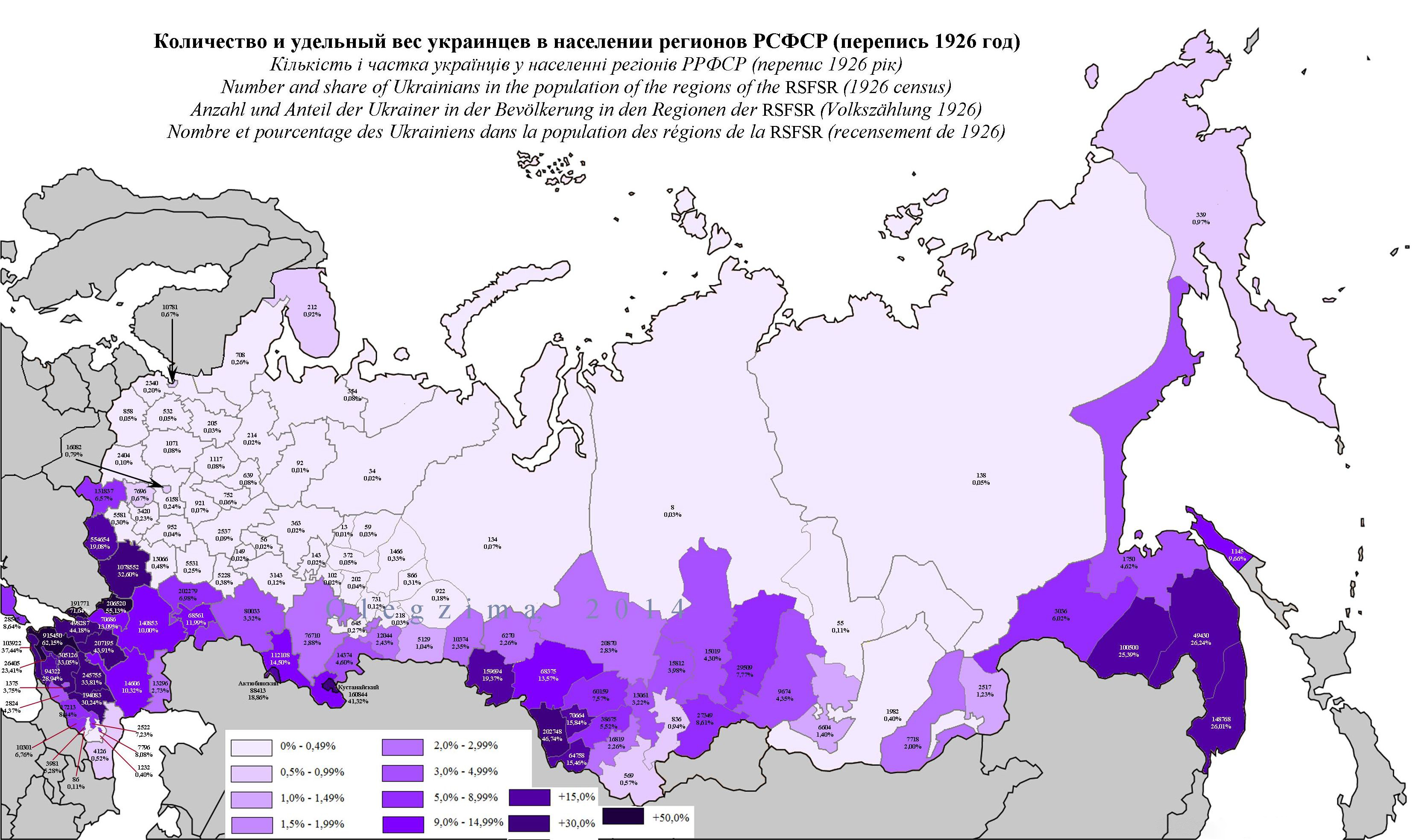
Number and share of Ukrainians in the population of the regions of the RSFSR (1926 census)

According to the Soviet census of 1926, there were 3,450,000 Ukrainians living outside of the Ukrainian Soviet Socialist Republic, divided as follows:

- In the European part of the Soviet Union: 1,310,000 Ukrainians
  - 242,000 Ukrainians living on land neighbouring the Ukrainian ethnic territory
  - 771,000 Ukrainians in the Volga and Ural regions
- In the Asian part of the Soviet Union: 2,138,000 Ukrainians
  - 861,000 Ukrainians in Kazakhstan
  - 830,000 Ukrainians in Siberia
  - 315,000 Ukrainians in the Far East
  - 64,000 Ukrainians in Kyrgyzstan
  - 33,000 Ukrainians in the Central Asian Republic
  - 35,000 Ukrainians in the Caucasus Region.

In Siberia, the vast majority of the Ukrainians lived in the Central Asian region and the Zeleny Klyn. On 1 January 1933, there were about 4.5 million Ukrainians (larger than the official figures) in the Soviet Union outside of the Ukrainian SSR, while in America there were 1.1-1.2 million Ukrainians.

In 1931, the Ukrainian diaspora can be counted as follows:

Ukrainian Diaspora in 1931

Country	Number (thousands)
Soviet Republics	9,020
Poland	6,876
Romania	1,200
USA	750
Czechoslovakia	650
Canada	400
Rest	368.5
In all	19,264.5

In the Ukrainian SSR, there were 25,300,278 Ukrainians.

=== 1945–1991 ===
==== Outside the Soviet Union and Eastern Europe ====
After the Second World War, the Ukrainian diaspora increased due to a second wave of displaced persons. The 250,000 Ukrainians at first settled in Germany and Austria. In the mid-to-late 1940s and early 1950s, these Ukrainians were resettled in many different countries creating new Ukrainian settlements in Australia, Venezuela, and for a time in Tunisia (Ben-Metir), as well as re-enforcing previous settlements in the United States, Canada (primarily Toronto, Ontario and Montreal, Quebec), Brazil (specially in the South and Southeast regions), Argentina and Paraguay. In Europe, there remained between 50,000 and 100,000 Ukrainians that settled in the United Kingdom, France, Belgium, and the Netherlands.

This second wave of emigrants re-invigorated Ukrainian organisations in the Americas and Western Europe. In 1967, in New York City, the World Congress of Free Ukrainians was created. Scientific organisations were created. An Institute of Ukrainian Studies at Harvard University was also created.

An attempt was made to unite the various religious organisations (Orthodox and Greek Catholic). However, this did not succeed. In the early 1970s, the Ukrainian Orthodox Church in the United States and Canada and the Ukrainian Autocephalous Orthodox Church in Europe, South America, and Australia managed to unite. Most of the other Orthodox churches maintained some religious links. The Ukrainian Greek Catholic Church had to wait until 1980 until its synod was recognised by the Vatican. The Ukrainian Evangelical and Baptist churches also created an All-Ukrainian Evangelical-Baptist Union.

==== Within the Soviet Union and Eastern Europe ====
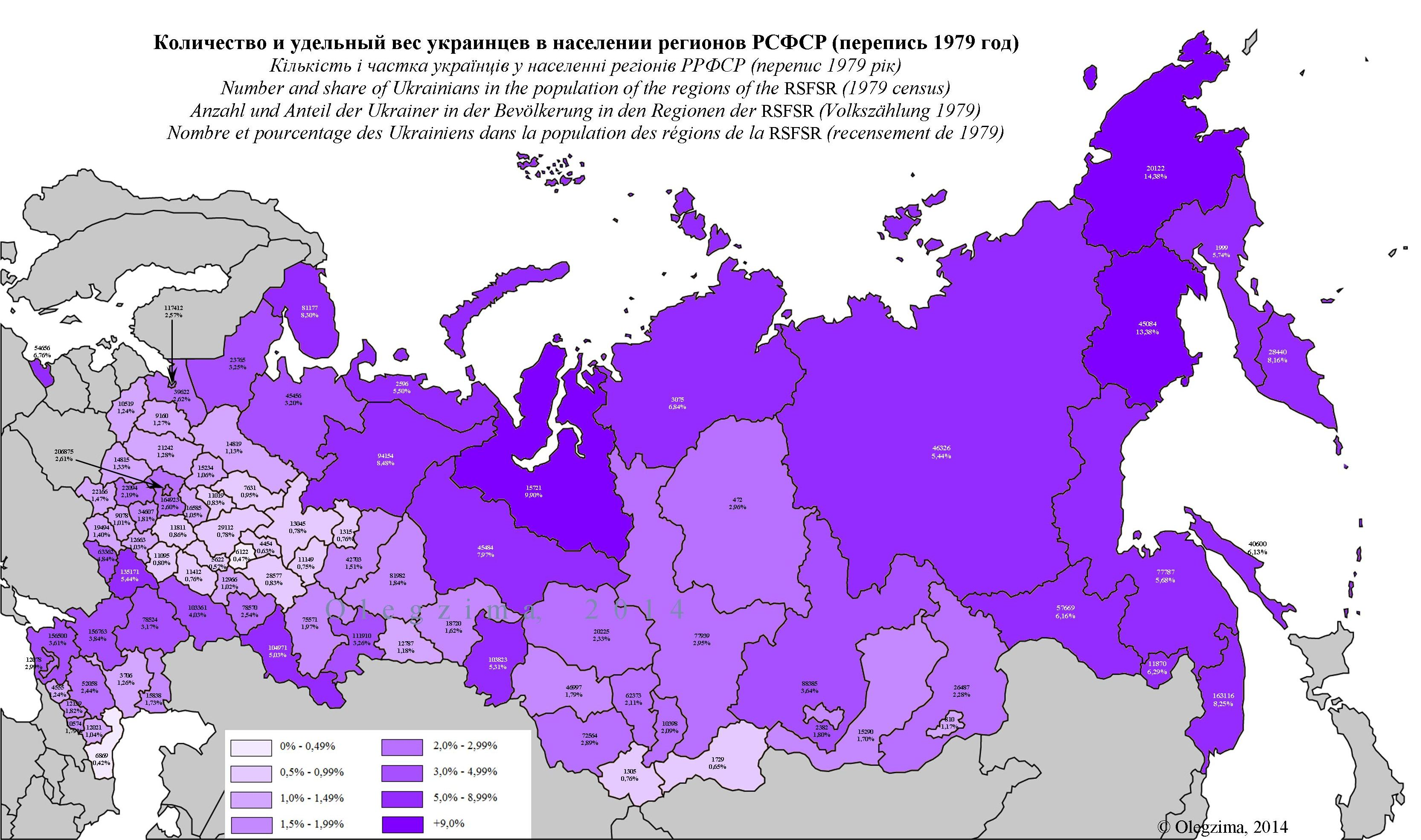
Number and share of Ukrainians in the population of the regions of the RSFSR (1979 census)

Post-Second World War, there was a strong net migration in the USSR. Most of the Ukrainian contingent that was leaving the Ukrainian SSR for other areas of the Union settled in places with other migrants. The cultural separation from Ukraine proper meant that many were to form the so-called "multicultural soviet nation". In Siberia, 82% of Ukrainian entered mixed marriages, primarily with Russians. This meant that outside the parent national republic and large cities in the Union there was little or no provisions for continuing a diaspora function. Thus Ukrainian literature and television could be found only in larger cities like Moscow. At the same time other signs of Ukrainian cultural heritage such as clothing and food were preserved. According to a Soviet sociologist, 27% of the Ukrainians in Siberia read Ukrainian printed material and 38% used the Ukrainian language. From time to time, Ukrainian groups would visit Siberia. Nonetheless, most of the Ukrainians did assimilate.

In Eastern Europe, the Ukrainian diaspora can be divided as follows:

- In Poland: 200–300,000 Ukrainians
- In Czechoslovakia: 120–150,000 Ukrainians
- In Romania: 100–150,000 Ukrainians
- In Yugoslavia: 45–50,000 Ukrainians.

In all these countries, Ukrainians had the status of a minority nation with their own socio-cultural organisations, schools, and press. The degree of these rights varied within the region. Yugoslavia granted Ukrainians the most rights.

The largest Ukrainian diaspora was in Poland. It consisted of those Ukrainians, which were left in the western parts of Galicia that after the Second World War remained in Poland and had not emigrated to the Ukrainian SSR or resettled, and those who were resettled to the western and northern parts of Poland, which before the Second World War had been part of Germany.

Ukrainians in Czechoslovakia lived in the Prešov Region, which can be considered Ukrainian ethnographic territory, and had substantial rights. The Ukrainians in the Prešov Region had their own church organisation.

Ukrainians in Romania lived in the Romanian parts of Bukovina and the Maramureş Region, as well as in scattered settlements throughout Romania.

Ukrainians in Yugoslavia lived primarily in Bačka and Srem regions of Vojvodina and Bosnia. These Ukrainians had their own church organisation as the Eparchy of Križevci.

==== Size ====
Of the countries where the Ukrainian diaspora had settled, only in Canada and the Soviet Union was information about ethnic background collected. However, the data from the Soviet Union is suspect and underestimates the number of Ukrainians. In 1970, the Ukrainian diaspora can be given as follows:

- In the Soviet Union: officially 5.1 million Ukrainians
  - In the European part: 2.8 million Ukrainians
  - In the Asian part: 2.3 million Ukrainians
- In Eastern Europe (outside of the Soviet Union): 465–650,000 Ukrainians
  - In Czechoslovakia: 120–150,000 Ukrainians
  - In Poland: 200–300,000 Ukrainians
  - In Romania: 100–150,000 Ukrainians
  - In Yugoslavia: 45–50,000 Ukrainians
- In Central and Western Europe: 88–107,000 Ukrainians
  - In Austria: 4–5,000 Ukrainians
  - In Germany: 20–25,000 Ukrainians
  - In France: 30–35,000 Ukrainians
  - In Belgium: 3–5,000 Ukrainians
  - In the United Kingdom: 50–100,000 Ukrainians
- In the Americas and Australia: 2.2-2.5 million Ukrainians:
  - In the US: 1.25-1.5 million Ukrainians
  - In Canada: 581,000 Ukrainians
  - In Brazil: 120,000 Ukrainians
  - In Argentina: 180–200,000 Ukrainians
  - In Paraguay: 10,000 Ukrainians
  - In Uruguay: 8,000 Ukrainians
  - In other American countries: 2,000 Ukrainians
  - In Australia and New Zealand: 30,000 Ukrainians.

For the Soviet Union, it can be assumed that about 10-12 million people of Ukrainian (7-9 million in Asia) heritage lived outside the Ukrainian SSR.

=== Post 1991 ===
After the independence of Ukraine in 1991, many Ukrainians emigrated to Western countries because of an economic depression in the 1990s.

Many Ukrainians live in Russia either along the Ukrainian border or in Siberia. In the 1990s, the number of Ukrainians living in Russia was calculated to be around 5 million. These regions, where Ukrainians live, can be subdivided into the following categories:

- The northern part of Sloboda Ukraine where Ukrainians have been living for centuries
- Siberian Ukrainians
- The rest of Russia, formed from systematic migration since the start of the 19th century.

Ukrainians can also be found in parts of Romania and Slovakia that border Ukraine.

The size of the Ukrainian diaspora has changed over time due to the following factors:

- Growth Factors
  1. New emigration from Ukraine
  2. Natural Growth
- Decrease Factors
  1. Returning of emigrants to Ukraine
  2. Assimilation

=== 21st century ===
As of 2020, the European Union was host of over half a million Ukrainian citizens, according to official records of residents collected by Eurostat. About half of the Ukrainian citizens in the EU were located in Italy.

On 24 February 2022, Russia launched a large-scale invasion of Ukraine, which has led to millions of Ukrainian civilians moving to neighbouring countries. Most crossed into Poland, Slovakia, and the Czech Republic, and others proceeded to at least temporarily settle in Hungary, Moldova, Germany, Austria, Romania and other European countries. Amid the mobilization restrictions the number of illegal border crossess also grows every year, e.g. Romanian Head of the Territorial Inspectorate of the Border Police (ITPF) reported over 13,000 illegal immigrations happening in 2024.

Influence of the Ukrainian Diaspora on Global Politics

The Ukrainian diaspora has played a significant role in advocating for Ukraine’s sovereignty and independence, particularly in North America and Europe. Ukrainian communities in Canada, the United States, and the United Kingdom have actively supported political movements, such as the recognition of the Holodomor as genocide and aid to Ukraine during the ongoing war with Russia.

Cultural Preservation and Revival

Ukrainian diaspora communities have maintained their cultural identity through dedicated efforts in language preservation, religious institutions, and cultural organizations. Ukrainian language schools, churches, and festivals, such as the Toronto Ukrainian Festival and the Ukrainian Village in Canada, continue to strengthen ties to Ukrainian heritage and educate future generations about their ancestry.

== Extended statistics ==
=== 2004 figures ===
In 2004, the Ukrainian diaspora was distributed as follows:

Ukrainian diaspora

Country	Number (thousands)	Main Areas of Settlement
Russia	1,928 (census) – 4,379	In the regions of Kursk, Voronezh, Saratov, Samara, Astrakhan, Vladivostok and the Don River. From Orenburg to the Pacific Ocean, in the Primorsky Krai along the Ussuri River, and in the Amur Oblast ("Zeleny Klyn") Norilsk, Magadan, Yakutia and Vorkuta
Kazakhstan	896.2-2,400	In the north and urban areas
Canada	1,209	Provinces: Ontario, Alberta, Manitoba, Saskatchewan, Quebec, and British Columbia
Brazil	1,000	States: Paraná, São Paulo, Santa Catarina, and Rio Grande do Sul
United States	900	States: Pennsylvania, New York, New Jersey, Massachusetts, Connecticut, Ohio, Illinois, Indiana, Michigan, Minnesota, Maryland, Florida, California, Texas, and Wisconsin
Poland	360-500 [27 (census 2002)]	Regions: Western and northern parts of Poland (voivodeships of Olsztyn, Szczecin, Wrocław, Gdańsk, and Poznań)
Greece	350–360	Regions: Northern Greece, Thessaloniki, Athens
Italy	320–350	Regions: North Italy, Naples, Sicily
Belarus	291–500	Brest Oblast
Moldova	275	Transnistria, Chişinău
Argentina	100–250	Provinces: Buenos Aires, Misiones, Chaco, Mendoza, Formosa, Córdoba, and Río Negro
Uzbekistan	153.2	Urban Centres
Kyrgyzstan	108	Urban Centres
Paraguay	102	Regions: in the area of Colonia Fram, Sandov, Nuevo Volyn, Bohdanivky, and Tarasivky
Slovakia	40–100	Regions: Eastern Slovakia, Prešov
Latvia	46	Urban Centres
Romania	61-90	Regions: Southern Bukovina (Suceava region), Maramureş region, Banat, and Northern Dobruja
former Yugoslavia	60	Regions: Vojvodina (Bačka Region), Bosnia-Herzegovina, and Croatia (Slavonia)
Portugal	40–150	Lisbon and surroundings, interior of the country
Georgia	52.4	Urban Centres
Czech Republic	50	Sudetenland
Estonia	48	Urban Centres
Lithuania	44	Urban Centres
Turkmenistan	35.6	Urban Centres
France	35	Regions: Central, Eastern, Southwestern, and Northwestern France
United Kingdom	35	Counties: Greater London, Lancashire, Yorkshire, as well as Central and Northern England and Scotland
Australia	35	States/territories: New South Wales, Victoria, Western Australia, South Australia, Queensland and ACT
Azerbaijan	32.3	Urban Centres
Germany	22	States: Bavaria, Baden-Württemberg, Hesse, North Rhine-Westphalia, and Lower Saxony
Turkey	20	Cities: Istanbul, Antalya, Ankara, İzmir, Bodrum and Mersin
Uruguay	10	Regions: Montevideo, San José, and Paysandú
Armenia	8.3	Urban Centres
Austria	9–10	Region: Vienna and surroundings
Belgium	5	Region: Central and Eastern Belgium
Finland	3–4	Region: Turku, Seinäjoki, Tampere, Helsinki and other big cities in Finland
Hungary	3	Region: The Tisza River Basin
Venezuela	3	Region: Caracas, Valencia, Maracay
New Zealand	2	Regions: Christchurch, Auckland, Wellington
Bulgaria	1.8	Region: Sofia, Plovdiv, Dobrich and other big cities in Bulgaria
Chile	1.0-1.5?	Region: Santiago, Chile
Netherlands	0.6	Region: on the border with Germany

=== Ukrainian diaspora distribution around the world ===
Continent/Country/Region	Year	Numbers	Notes
EUROPE			
Andorra	2016	100	
Austria	2024	80,665	(2016) 12,000; (2015) 8,232; (2010) 7,038; (2005) 6,367; (2000) 5,696; (1995) 5,115; (1990) 4,534; (1946) 29,000; (1944) 100,000; (1918) 50,000
Belarus	2015	225,734	(2010–2009) 227,722-159,000; (2005) 230,971; (2000–1999) 234,219-237,000; (1995) 248,032; (1990–1989) 261,845-291,008; (1979) 230,985; (1970) 190,839; (1959) 133,061; (1939) 104,247; (1926) 34,681
Belgium	2017	3,397	(2015) 4,981; (2010) 2,999; (2005) 1,848; (2000) 2,202; (1995) 2,283; (1990) 2,298; (1949) 5,000; (1947) 10,000; (1945) 2,000; (1939) 1,000
Bosnia and Herzegovina	2013	2,331	(1991) 3,929; (1953) 7,455 (1948) 7,883; (1850) 10,000
Bulgaria	2016	1,780	(2015) 6,400; (2010) 5,631; (2005) 4,526; (2000) 3,230; (1995) 2,451; (1990) 1,671
Croatia	2011	1,878	(2001) 1,977; (1991) 2,494; (1981) 2,515; (1971) 2,793; (1948) 6,397
Czech Republic	2016	110,245	(2015) 97,474; (2014) 102,127; (2011–2010) 53,253-125,343; (2005) 73,905; (2001) 22,112; (2000) 16,397; (1995) 12,298; (1991) 8,220; (1980) 10,271; (1970) 9,794
Denmark	2019	11,148	(2018) 12,144; (2016) 8,000; (2015) 6,870; (2010) 6,508; (2005) 3,602; (2000) 695; (1995) 650; (1990) 605; (1945) 1,500
Estonia	2019	23,665	(2018) 23,310; (2017) 23,183; (2016) 23,256; (2015) 22,562; (2013) 22,972; (2011) 22,573; (2005) 24,004; (2000) 29,012; (1995) 33,755; (1989) 48,271; (1979) 36,044; (1970) 28,086; (1959) 15,769; (1934) 92; (1897) 230
Finland	2016	5,000	(2015) 2,436; (2010) 1,040; (2005) 611; (2000) 337; (1995) 113; (1990) 11
France	2017	16,121	(2016) 40,000; (2015) 15,880; (2010) 14,681; (2005) 12,020; (2000) 8,378; (1995) 8,124; (1990) 7,869; (1955–1946) 40,000; (1939) 40,000; (1922) 5,000
Germany	2017	262,027	(2016) 272,000; (2015) 261,147; (2010) 252,446; (2005) 203,852; (2000) 155,257; (1995) 85,683; (1990) 16,108; (1946) 178,000 in West Germany
Greece	2017	19,104-32,000	(2016) 32,000; (2015) 19,457; (2010) 19,883; (2005) 18,198; (2000) 16,512; (1995) 8,282; (1990) 189
Holy See	2017	50	Ukrainian Greek-catholic clergy
Hungary	2011	7,396	(2001) 7,393; (2000) 19,867; (1995) 11,454; (1990) 3,040
Iceland	2017	335	(2015) 274; (2013) 255; (2011) 217; (2009) 215; (2007) 173; (2005) 118; (2003) 63; (2000) 22; (1995) 17; (1990) 11
Ireland	2017	4,908	(2016) 4,624; (2015) 4,564; (2011) 4,123; (2005) 3,627; (2000) 2,189; (1995) 925; (1990) 170
Italy	2017	234,354-236,420	(2017) 234,354; (2016) 230,728-240,141; (2015–2014) 222,241-219,050; (2012) 180,121; (2010) 222,203; (2007) 600,000-1,000,000; (2005) 117,957; (2000) 13,711; (1995) 6,959; (1990) 206; (1946) 12,000; (1918) 120,000
Kosovo	2017	42	(2014) 145; (2006) 449; (1991) 24; (1948) 31
Latvia	2019	43,069	(2018) 50,699; (2017) 43,623; (2011) 45,798; (2005) 47,145; (2000) 63,644; (1989) 92,101; (1979) 66,703; (1970) 53,461; (1959) 29,440; (1935) 1,844; (1925) 512
Liechtenstein	2017	43	(2015) 37; (2010) 20; (2005) 14; (2000) 9; (1995) 6; (1990) 3
Lithuania	2015	12,248	(2011–2010) 16,423-14,475; (2005) 18,521; (2001) 22,488; (1995) 25,598; (1989) 44,789; (1979) 31,982; (1970) 25,099; (1959) 17,692; (1923) 43
Luxembourg	2017	184-742	(2016) 742; (2015) 175; (2010) 115; (2005) 133; (2000) 154; (1995) 160; (1990) 169
Macedonia	2017	64	(2016) 140; (2010) 60; (2005) 58; (2000) 57; (1995) 61; (1990) 65
Malta	2017	896	(2015) 336; (2010) 268; (2005) 145; (2000) 92; (1995) 36; (1990) 30
Moldova	2014	325,235	(2004) 442,475; (1989) 600,366; (1979) 560,679; (1970) 506,560; (1959) 420,820; (1941) 261,200; (1930) 315,004; (1897) 379,698; (1856) 119,000; (1817) 30,000
Monaco	2011	10-20	
Montenegro	2017	121	(2015) 141; (2010) 135; (1991) 24; (1948) 23
Netherlands	2024	114.000	(2016) 5,000; (2015) 1,208; (2010) 681; (2005) 427; (2000) 92; (1995) 67; (1992) 1,000
Norway	2020	7,700	(2019) 6,285;(2015) 4,236; (2010) 2,463; (2005) 1,120; (2001) 399; (1995) 77; (1990–1970) 6; (1944) 16,562
Poland	2018	2,000,000	(2016) 1,200,000-1,500,000; (2015) 206,518; (2010) 214,193; (2005) 263,473; (2000) 321,013; (1995) 375,267; (1990) 438,692
Portugal	2017	47,360	(2015) 45,051; (2014) 41,091; (2009) 52,293; (2007) 39,480; (2006) 41,870; (2004) 66,227; (2002) 60,571; (2000) 10,882; (1995) 6,899; (1990) 3,196
Romania	2011	51,703-200,000	(2002) 61,098-300,000; (1992) 65,472; (1977) 55,510; (1966) 54,705; (1956) 60,479; (1930) 45,875
Russian Federation	2015	3,269,992	(2010) 1,927,988-2,978,217; (2005) 3,293,929; (2002) 2,942,961; (2000) 3,541,839; (1995) 3,485,074; (1989) 4,362,872; (1979) 3,657,647; (1970) 3,345,885; (1959) 3,359,083; (1939) 3,205,061; (1926) 6,870,976; (1897) 4,164,847
San Marino	2017	62	(2015) 60; (2010) 53; (2005) 50; (2000) 48; (1995) 25; (1990) 4
Serbia	2011	4,903	(2002) 5,354; (1991) 5,032; (1953) 23,043; (1948) 22,636
Slovakia	2015	10,001	(2011–2010) 7,430-8,258; (2005) 7,365; (2001) 10,814; (1991) 13,281
Slovenia	2015	1,764	(2010) 1,499; (2005) 884; (2000) 299; (1995) 193; (1990) 89; (1948) 170
Spain	2025	209,592	(2025) 209,592; (2020) 112,728; (2016) 90,530-100,000; (2015) 84,127; (2010) 79,843; (2005) 61,162; (2000) 2,115; (1995) 1,038; (1990) 408
Sweden	2019	11,069	(2017) 8,000; (2015) 6,982; (2010) 4,741; (2005) 2,777; (2000) 1,459; (1995) 1,360; (1990) 1,146
Switzerland	2017	7,641	(2016) 6,681; (2015) 7,367; (2010) 6,269; (2005) 5,401; (2000) 4,638; (1995) 3,109; (1990) 1,593
United Kingdom	2015	23,414	(2010) 30,000; (2001) 30,000-100,000; (1955) 22,000-27,000; (1949–1946) 33,000-35,000; (1944–1940) 10,000; (1933) 150; (1912) 500
ASIA			
Afghanistan	2015	10	
Armenia	2015	2,645	(2011) 1,176; (2005) 1,990; (2001) 1,633; (2000) 3,008; (1995) 5,665; (1989) 8,341; (1979) 8,900; (1970) 8,390; (1959) 5,593; (1939) 5,496; (1926) 2,286
Azerbaijan	2009	21,509	(1999) 28,984; (1989) 32,345; (1979) 26,402; (1970) 29,160; (1959) 25,778; (1939) 23,643; (1926) 18,241
Bahrain	2016	100-300	
China	2016	3,000-5,000	(1999) 20,000; (1949) 7,000; (1945–1930) 35,000-50,000; (1929–1922) 30,000-45,000; (1920–1898) 65,000-70,000
Hong Kong, China	2016	100	
Macau, China	2016	30	
Cyprus	2015	3,650	(2011) 3,023; (2005) 2,181; (2000) 1,490; (1995) 1,153; (1990) 815
Georgia	2015	22,263	(2014) 6,034; (2010) 24,030; (2005–2002) 26,802-7,039; (2000) 29,734; (1995) 38,158; (1990–1989) 46,581-52,443; (1979) 45,036; (1970) 49,622; (1959) 52,236; (1939) 45,595; (1926) 14,356
India	2014	120	(2010) 105; (2007) 96; (2004) 78; (1999) 63
Indonesia	2017	21	(1999) 13
Iraq	2010	12	(2008) 1690; (2004) 1608
Iran	2019	237	(2016) 900; (2010) 260; (1999) 603
Israel	2016	30,000-90,000	(2015–2014) 135,112-36,649; (2010) 131,007-53,577; (2007) 47,019; (2006) 54,497; (2000) 164,271; (1999) 22,261; (1995) 170,963; (1990) 168, 081
Japan	2018	1,824	(2017) 1,992; (2016) 1,867; (2010) 502 (2006) 236
Jordan	2016	5,000	(2010) 892; (2007) 874; (2005) 694; (2000) 480; (1995) 263; (1990) 45
Kazakhstan	2015	338,022	(2014) 301,346; (2009) 333,031; (1999) 547,065; (1989) 896,240; (1979) 897,964; (1970) 930,158; (1959) 762,131; (1939) 658,319; (1926) 860,822; (1827) 79,573
Korea, Republic of	2016	2,485	
Kuwait	2016	400	(2010) 141; (2007) 111; (2004) 94
Kyrgyzstan	2021	9,243	(2014) 14,485; (2009) 21,924; (2005) 41,787; (2000) 52,617; (1999) 50,442; (1995) 69,408; (1989) 108,027; (1979) 109,324; (1970) 120,081; (1959) 137,031; (1939) 137,299; (1926) 64,128
Laos	2016	10	
Lebanon	2016	5,000	(2010) 1,242; (2007) 977; (2006) 883; (2000) 218; (1995) 120; (1990) 21
Malaysia	2016	500	(2010) 44; (2007) 28; (2004) 24
Maldives	2017	15	
Mongolia	2016	20	
Myanmar	2016	10	
Nepal	2015	196	
Oman	2016	200	
Pakistan	2010	90	(2006) 112; (2004) 37; (1999) 24
Philippines	2015	31	
Qatar	2016	1,000	
Saudi Arabia	2016	600	(2010) 66; (2004) 140; (1999) 35
Singapore	2016	500	(2014) 221; (2010) 110; (2004) 84
Syria	2010	574-3,708	(2007) 644; (2006) 567; (2004) 473
Taiwan	2017	214	(2021) 214
Tajikistan	2015	1,250	(2010) 1,090-1,261; (2005) 1,233; (2000) 3,787; (1989) 41,375; (1979) 35,826; (1970) 31,671; (1959) 26,921; (1939) 17,360; (1926) 1,090
Thailand	2016	800	
Turkey	2016	20,000-35,000	(2015) 20,547; (2010) 4,133; (2005) 4,011; (2000) 3,893; (1995) 2,447; (1990) 1,011
Turkmenistan	2015	4,822	(2010) 11,000; (1995) 23,064; (1989) 35,578; (1979) 37,118; (1970) 35,398; (1959) 20,955; (1939) 21,778; (1926) 6,877
United Arab Emirates	2017	11,145	(2014) 5,000; (2007) 588
Uzbekistan	2015	124,602	(2010) 129,604; (2005) 132,963; (2000) 104,720-131,027; (1995) 153,360; (1989) 153,197; (1979) 113,826; (1970) 114,979; (1959) 87,927; (1939) 70,577; (1926) 25,335
Vietnam	2016	1,000-2,000	(2010) 179; (2004) 248; (1999) 337
Yemen	2011	110	
AFRICA			
Algeria	2015	300	(2010) 203; (2007) 198; (2006) 168
Angola	2018	440	(2007) 14; (2006) 76
Cabo Verde	2015	22	(2010) 21; (2005) 34; (2000) 46; (1995) 37; (1990) 28
Congo, Democratic Republic	2019	268	(2014) 282
Egypt	2016	4,000	(2006) 597; (2000) 125; (1995) 92; (1990) 67
Ethiopia	2016	30	
Guinea	2015	326	(2010) 293; (2007) 169; (2005) 189; (2000) 104; (1995) 96; (1990) 84
Kenya	2016	100	(2007) 24; (2006) 39
Liberia	2014	269	(2010) 297; (2004) 318
Libya	2016	1,500-2,500	(2010) 776; (2005) 709; (2000) 644; (1995) 413; (1990) 189
Madagascar	2017	4	
Mauritania	2017	100	
Mauritius	2017	22	
Morocco	2017	500	(2010) 296
Mozambique	2016	400	
Namibia	2015	235	(2010) 257; (2005) 267; (2000) 338; (1995) 363; (1990) 380
Nigeria	2014	152	(2010) 100; (2006) 165; (2004) 81
Senegal	2014	35	
Seychelles	2017	3	
Sierra Leone	2004	449	
South Africa	2016	1,000	(2015) 4,090; (2010) 3,012; (2005) 1,887; (2000) 1,577; (1995) 1,488; (1990) 1,822
South Sudan	2017	4	
Sudan	2017	6	
Tunisia	2015	2,000	(2010) 264; (2006) 249
Uganda	2017	100	
NORTH AMERICA			
Bahamas	2015	18	(2010) 17; (2005) 9
Canada	2016	1,359,655	(2011) 1,251,170; (2006) 1,209,085; (2001) 1,071,055; (1996) 1,026,475; (1991) 1,054,300; (1981) 529,615; (1971) 580,660; (1961) 473,337; (1951) 395,043; (1941) 305,929; (1931) 225,113; (1921) 106,721; (1914) 100,000; (1911) 75,432; (1901) 5,682
Costa Rica	2015	159	(2010) 153; (2005) 78; (2000) 119; (1995) 102; (1990) 135
Cuba	2015	577	(2010) 641; (2005) 702; (2000) 705; (1995) 1,036; (1990) 1,367
Dominican Republic	2016	1,200-2,000	(2015) 76; (2010) 72; (2005) 110; (2000) 148; (1995) 135; (1990) 121
Mexico	2015	1,500	(2010) 329; (2005) 307; (2000) 322; (1995) 279; (1990) 250
Nicaragua	2015	78	(2010) 73; (2005) 69; (2000) 65; (1995) 64; (1990) 80
Panama	2015	502	(2010) 428; (2005) 271; (2000) 128; (1995) 94; (1990) 66
United States of America	2016	1,028,492	(2015) 986,698; (2013) 968,754-2,000,000; (2010) 939,746; (1990) 740,803; (1980) 730,056; (1975) 2,000,000; (1935) 656,000-700,000; (1914) 350,000; (1900) 350,000; (1899) 100,000; (1892) 50,000
SOUTH AMERICA			
Argentine	2007	1,000,000	(2024) 1,000,000; (1977) 200,000-240,000; (1960) 70,000; (1939) 50,000-70,000; (1914) 14,000; (1902) 1,600; (1901) 1,700; (1900) 1,600; (1898) 250; (1897) 46; (the end of XVII-beg. of XVIII cen.) 30
Bolivia	2015	114	(2010) 98; (2005) 106; (2000) 114; (1995) 57
Brazil	2015	600,000	(2009) 500,000; (1994) 250,000-400,000; (1970) 120,000; (1914) 45,000; (1895) 5,000
Chile	2013	1,000	(2010) 98; (2005) 128; (2000) 157; (1995) 96; (1990) 35; (1970) 40; (1949–1948) 300
Colombia	2015	226	(2010) 211; (2005) 188; (2000) 197; (1995) 203; (1990) 208
Ecuador	2015	401	(2010) 276; (2005) 197; (2000) 167; (1995) 151; (1990) 134
Paraguay	2018	10,000-12,000	(2014) 12,000-40,000; (1994) 5,000-8,000; (1938–1927) 10,800
Peru	2017	500	(2015) 241; (2010) 223; (2007) 109; (2005) 206; (2000) 176; (1995) 150; (1990) 171
Uruguay	2018	300	(1990) 10,000-15,000; (1970) 8,000-10,000
Venezuela	2013	3,000	(1987) 1,100; (1968) 1,500; (1947) 3,400; (1946) 8
OCEANIA			
Australia	2011	38,791	(2006) 37,800; (1998) 30,000-50,000; (1990–1980) 34,000; (1970–1945) 20,608; (1914) 5,000
New Zealand	2018	672-1,152	(2015) 672–1,402; (2010) 1,263; (2005) 1,104; (2000) 817; (1995) 330; (1990) 247; (1949) 170
Vanuatu	2016	5	
ANTARCTICA	2020	11	(2019–2013) 12; (2012–2011) 11; (2010) 10; (2009) 11; (2008–2007) 14; (2006–2005) 13; (2004) 15; (2003) 15–36; (2002) 15; (2001) 12; (2000) 13; (1999) 12; (1998) 11; (1997) 13; (1996) 12; (1994) 4 Scientific and technical activities. Staff of Ukrainian Vernadsky Research Base (Galindez Island, Wilhelm Archipelago, Graham Land)

== Communities ==
=== Europe ===
==== Czechia ====
Czechia had a substantial Ukrainian community already before the Russian invasion of Ukraine, with 196,875 Ukrainian citizens living in the country at the end of 2021. By the end of 2025, 612,953 Ukrainian citizens lived in Czechia, representing about 5.6% of the country's population. In June 2026, Czechia also hosted 390,810 people from Ukraine under temporary protection. This was the third-highest number in the European Union, after Germany and Poland, and the highest relative to population, at 35.8 per 1,000 inhabitants.

==== Finland ====
The Ukrainian community in Finland grew rapidly following the Russian invasion of Ukraine. By the end of 2025, 49,369 Ukrainian citizens lived in Finland, making Ukrainians the country's largest group of foreign citizens and representing about 0.9% of the population.

==== France ====
France had 18,541 adult Ukrainian citizens with residence authorization at the end of 2021. This population increased more than fourfold, reaching 85,041 in 2022 and 89,929 by the end of 2025. More than half of the Ukrainians present in 2025 had arrived in 2022. The community remained concentrated around major urban centres, with Île-de-France accounting for more than a quarter of the adult Ukrainian population.

==== Germany ====
Germany had 155,310 Ukrainian citizens at the end of 2021, before the Russian invasion of Ukraine. The population increased sharply after the invasion, reaching 1,164,200 in 2022 and 1,409,565 by the end of 2025, making Ukrainians the second-largest group of foreign citizens in Germany after Turkish citizens. In June 2026, Germany hosted 1,286,230 people from Ukraine under temporary protection, the highest number in the European Union.

==== Italy ====
Italy has a long-established Ukrainian community that grew substantially through labour migration during the 2000s, particularly among women working in domestic and care services. The community expanded further following the Russian invasion of Ukraine. By the end of 2024, 392,389 Ukrainian citizens were legally residing in Italy, making Ukrainians the country's largest non-EU national community.

==== Poland ====
Poland had a large Ukrainian community before the Russian invasion of Ukraine, with migration from Ukraine increasing substantially after 2014, particularly for employment. By December 2021, more than 300,000 Ukrainian citizens held valid residence permits in Poland. In February 2025, about 1.55 million Ukrainian citizens had valid residence status in Poland. In June 2026, Poland hosted 961,170 people from Ukraine under temporary protection, the second-highest number in the European Union after Germany.

==== Portugal ====
Ukrainians constituted the second-largest foreign community residing in Portugal, with 44,074 residents in 2012.

==== Russia ====
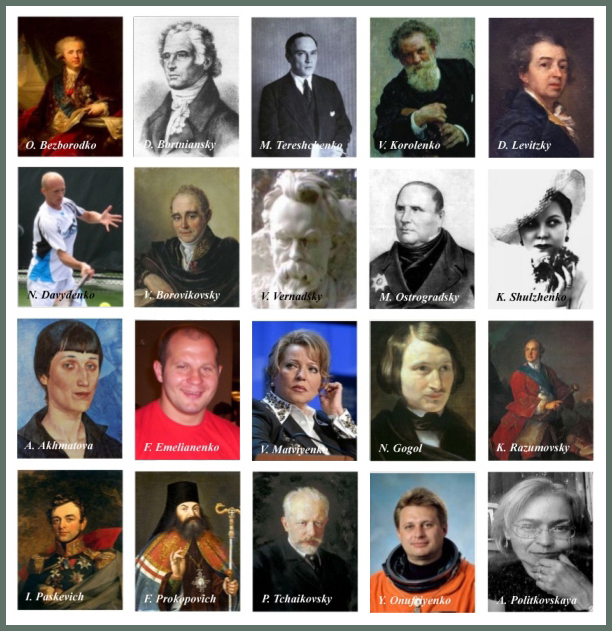
Group of prominent Ukrainians in Russia.

As of 2021, there are 884,007 ethnic Ukrainians in Russia. They form the country's eighth-largest ethnic group.

==== Serbia ====
In Serbia, there are 4,903 (0.08%) ethnic Ukrainians with Serbian citizenship according to the 2011 census. According to the 2002 census there were 5,354 (0.82%) and according to the 1991 census 5,042. Until 1971, Ukrainians and Pannonian Rusyns were counted together.

==== Spain ====
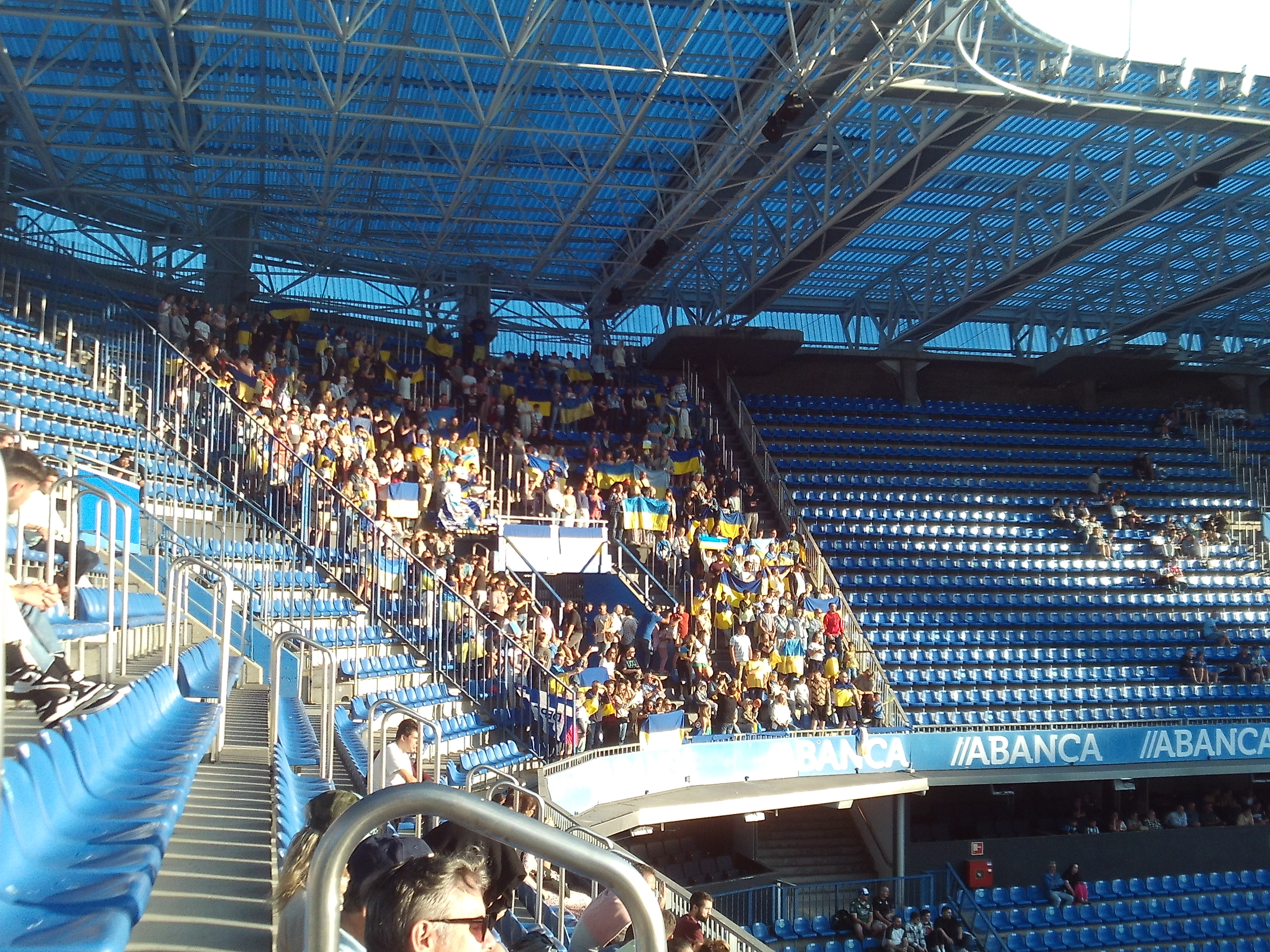
Ukrainian supporters in Corunna, Galicia, Spain.

According to official Spanish statistics, there were 209,592 Ukrainian-born persons in 2025, up from 112,728 as of late 2019, being the 12th biggest foreign nationality found in Spain.

==== United Kingdom ====
List of notable British people of Ukrainian descent:

- Milton Shulman (1913–2004)
- Isidor Zuckermann (d. 1946)
- Stefan Kiszko (d. 1993), wrongfully convicted of murder, clerk
- Cary Cooper (born 1940), American-born British psychologist
- Vernon Bogdanor (b. 1943), scientist, historian
- Michael Grade (born 1943), television executive, businessman
- Marina Lewycka (1946–2025)
- Jenny Manson (born 1948), activist, author, former local politician, civil servant
- Rafail Turkoniak (born 1949), theologian
- Zoë Wanamaker (born 1949), American-British actress
- Alexander Beleschenko (born 1951), artist
- Richard Desmond (born 1951) publisher, businessman
- Cliff Lazarenko (born 1952)
- Mick Antoniw (b. 1954), Welsh politician
- Narisa Chakrabongse (RTGS: Naritsa Chakkraphong, born 1956), Thai publisher, author, environmental activist
- Oliver Letwin (born 1956), Member of Parliament
- Dmytro Morykit (born 1956), composer, pianist
- Lisa Beznosiuk (born 1956), musician
- Mykola Pawluk (born 1956), video editor
- Alexandra Shulman (born 1957), journalist
- Taras Kuzio (born 1958 ), academic, expert in Ukrainian political, economic and security affairs
- John Daszak, opera singer (debut at The Royal Opera in 1996 and has performed widely in Europe.
- Nicola Shulman (b. 1960) biographer, former model
- James Marquand (born 1964), movie editor and director
- Melinda Simmons, Ambassador of the United Kingdom in Ukraine (since 2019).
- Nick Clegg (born 1967), media executive, former politician
- Mark Pougatch (born 1968), journalist, author
- Charlotte Gainsbourg (born 1971), English-French actress, singer-songwriter.
- Gregory Rusedski (born 1973), tennis player
- Svitlana Pyrkalo (born 1976), journalist, writer
- Olga Kurylenko (born 1979), model, actress
- Natalie Lisinska (born 1982), actress
- Alexander Slabinsky (b.1986), tennis player
- Alexander Stafford (born 1987), politician
- Stepan Pasicznyk (b. 1963), translator, musician
- Alison King (born 1973), actress, model
- Vera Filatova (born 1982), actress
- Darren Dawidiuk (born 1987), rugby player
- Jack Lisowski (born 1991), snooker player
- Max Kilman (born 1997), footballer
- Callum Styles (born 2000), footballer

=== North America ===
==== Canada ====
In 2016, there were an estimated 1,359,655 persons of full or partial Ukrainian origin residing in Canada (the majority being Canadian-born citizens), making them Canada's eleventh largest ethnic group. Canada therefore has the world's second-largest Ukrainian population outside Ukraine, after Russia.

==== United States ====
According to a 2006 government estimate, there were 976,314 Americans of Ukrainian ancestry.

The Ukrainian diaspora in the United States consists of approximately 1.1 million individuals who were born in Ukraine or reported Ukrainian ancestry, according to tabulations from the 2019 ACS. It is not among the top 20 diasporas in size.

== See also ==
- Shevchenko Scientific Society
- Ukrainian Association of Washington State
- Ukrainian Village, Chicago
- Ukrainian World Congress
