= Morozenko =

Morozenko (Ukrainian: Морозенко) is a Ukrainian surname. It may refer to:

- Morozenko, pen name of Sydir Vorobkevych (1836–1903), Ukrainian composer and writer
- Pavel Morozenko (1939–1991), Soviet-Ukrainian actor
- Stanislav (Nestor) Morozenko (died 1649), born Stanisław Mrozowicki, military commander of Zaporozhian Cossacks
- Yevhen Morozenko (born 1991), Ukrainian footballer
