= Vitaly Teslenko =

Russian ice hockey player

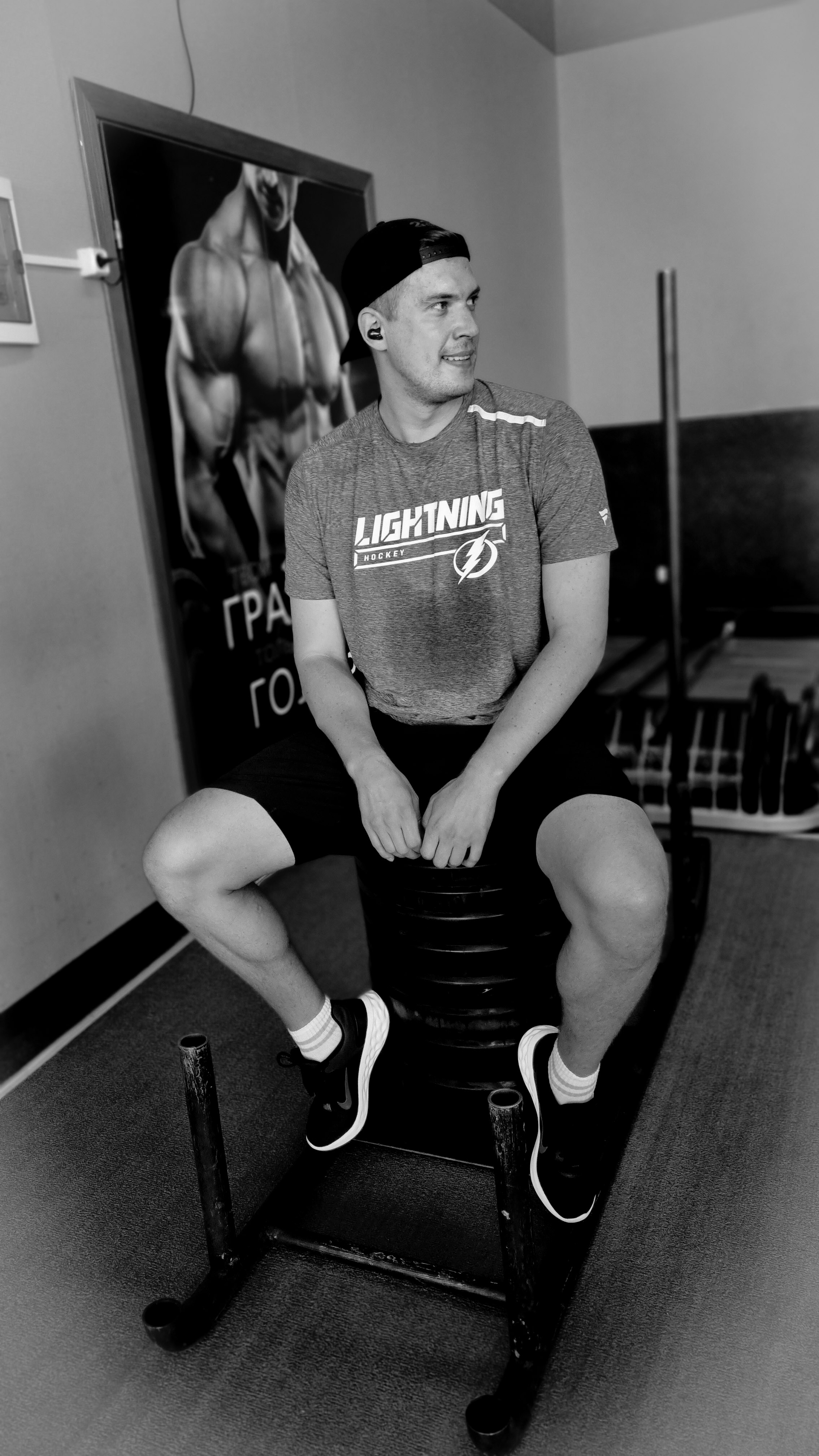
- Born: February 15, 1993 (age 32); Angarsk, Russia
- Height: 6 ft 3 in (191 cm)
- Weight: 194 lb (88 kg; 13 st 12 lb)
- Position: Defence
- Shoots: Left
- KHL team: Amur Khabarovsk
- NHL draft: Undrafted
- Playing career: 2012–present

Vitaly Teslenko (born February 15, 1993) is a Russian professional ice hockey defenceman. He is currently playing with Amur Khabarovsk of the Kontinental Hockey League (KHL).

Teslenko made his Kontinental Hockey League debut playing with Amur Khabarovsk during the 2012–13 season.
