= Volodymyr Serhiychuk =

Ukrainian historian, writer and politician

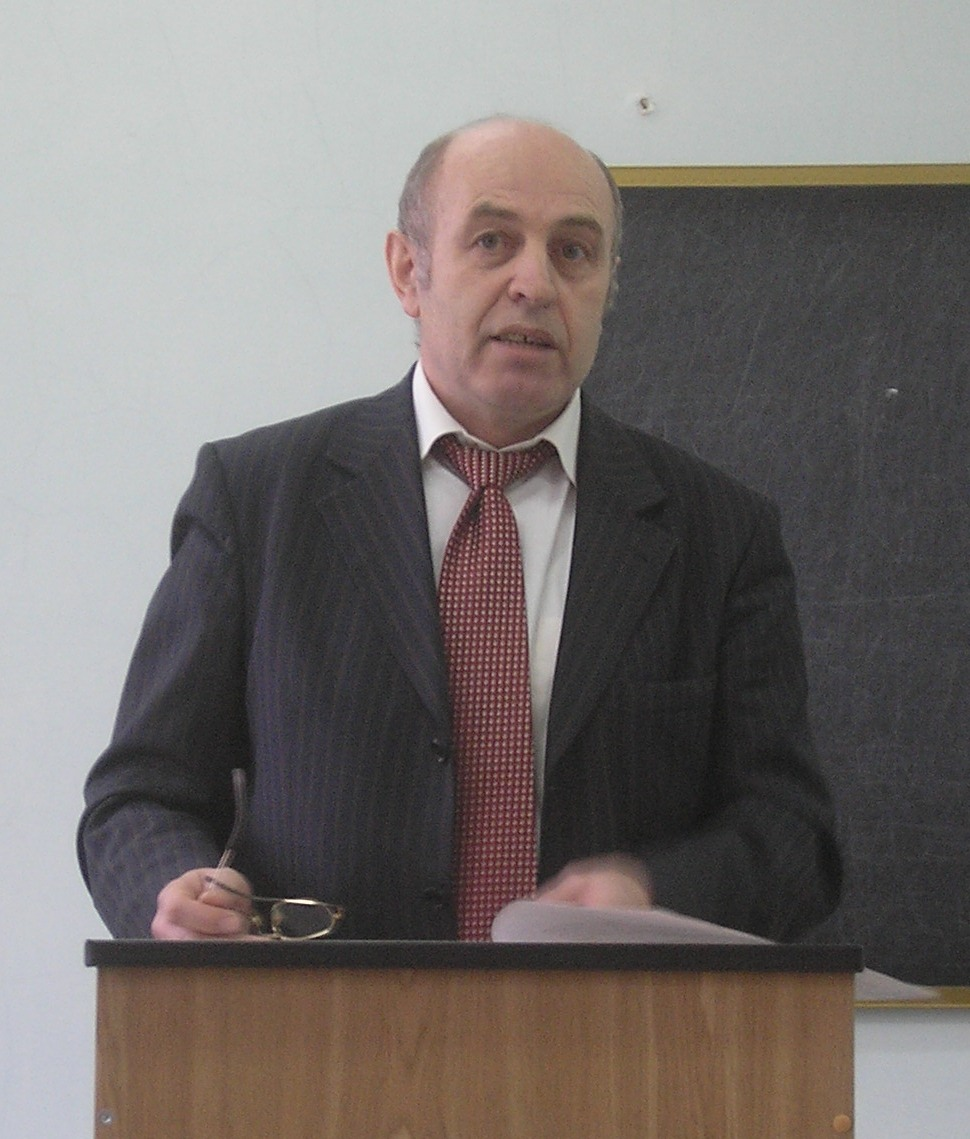
Volodymyr Serhiychuk

Volodymyr Ivanovych Serhiychuk (Ukrainian: Володимир Іванович Сергійчук) (born March 13, 1950, Pustokha village, Zhytomyr Oblast) is a Ukrainian historian, writer and politician.

A professor of Kiev University (from 1996) where he is a director of the Centre of Ukrainian Studies (from 2000) Serhiychuk is an academician (full member) of the National Academy of Science of Ukraine. He defended his Candidate of Science dissertation titled '"People's Army" in Ukraine in the period of the struggle for independence in 1648-1654 (the organization, munitions, supplies)' in 1982. His Doctor of Science dissertation he defended in 1992 was on "The Ukrainian Cossack Army of the second half of the 16th - 17th century". A member of Ukrainian Parliament, he received a scientific Mazepa Prize (1995), Cross of Ivan Mazepa (2010) and other state prizes.

Serhiychuk researches problems in Ukrainian history, in particular the Ukrainian Cossacks, resettlement of Ukrainians throughout the world, the fate of national minorities in Ukraine, the activities of the Ukrainian Insurgent Army and the Organization of Ukrainian Nationalists, and the contributions of Ukrainians to world science and culture.

== Publications ==
Serhiychuk is the author of numerous articles. Separate monographs such as

- "In the name of the Zaprozhian host" (1991)
- "National symbols of Ukraine" (1992)
- "The Germans in Ukraine" (1994)
- "Ethnic and political borders of Ukraine" (2000)
- "OUN and UIA in the War years" (1996)
- "The Army of Bohdan Khmelnytsky" (1996)
- "Our blood - on our land" (1996)
- "The truth about Jewish pogroms" (1996)
- "How we were tortured by hunger" (1996)
- "Bohdan Khmelnytsky and his commanders" (1997)
- "The tragedy of Ukrainians in Volyn" (1997)
- "Pogroms in Ukraine. 1914-1920" (1998)
- "10 stormy years. Western Ukrainian lands in 1944-1953" (1998)
- "Ukrainian cooperation" (1999)
- "Deportation of Poles from Ukraine" (1999)
- "Symon Petlura and the Jews" (1999)
- "The truth about the "Golden September" of 1939" (1999)
- "The Ukrainization of Russia" (2000)
- "Soviet partizans against the OUN and UIA" (2000)
- "Ukrainian Crimea" (2000)
- "The tragedy of Volyn" (2003)
- "The Poles in Volyn during WWII" (2003)
- "The Pereyaslav Council - tragedy for Ukraine and loss for Europe" (2003) and others.

== Awards ==
- The 3rd Class of the Order of Merit (2007)
- The Cross of Ivan Mazepa (2010)

== Sources ==
- Short bio and article on Ukrainian Crimea (in Ukrainian)
- Biography in Ukrainian (in Ukrainian)
