= Soyuqbulaq =

Soyuqbulaq or Soyukbulak or Soyukbulaq may refer to:

- Soyuqbulaq, Agstafa, Azerbaijan
- Soyuqbulaq, Gadabay, Azerbaijan
- Soyuqbulaq, Jalilabad, Azerbaijan
- Soyuqbulaq, Kalbajar, Azerbaijan
- Soyuqbulaq, Lachin, Azerbaijan
