= Azov Cossack Host =

Cossack host on the northern shore of the Sea of Azov

The Azov Cossack Host (Ukrainian: Азовське козацьке військо; Russian: Азовское Казачье Войско) was a Cossack host that existed on the northern shore of the Sea of Azov, between 1832 and 1862.

The host was made up of several Cossack groups who were re-settled there. The most numerous were the former Danubian Sich Cossacks, who came under Russian Patronage in 1828. The host was the only one in the Russian Empire whose primary task was Naval Coast Guard duties, participating extensively in the course of the Caucasus and Crimean wars.

== Zadunaets za Azovom ==
During the Russo-Turkish War (1828–1829), the Danubian Sich Cossacks, previously living in exile in Ottoman controlled Danube Delta were split in loyalty towards the Orthodox Russian Empire, who they left in 1775 and the Islamic Ottoman Empire, which was about to start another war with Russia. Led by their Kosh ataman Osip Gladky, some of the Cossacks, chose to defect to Russia, where they were pardoned by Nicholas I in 1828. The Tsar formed a Special Zaporozhian Host out of them, who took extensive part in the war.

After Russia's victory, a separate newly created Danube Cossack Host was deemed sufficient to safeguard the borders and the ex-Zaporozhian presence in the Danube was deemed excessive. The Tsar, having personally befriended Gladky, suggested that his Host moves to the Kuban to join the other ex-Zaporozhian Cossacks, the Black Sea Cossack Host who were actively involved against the Circassians in the course of the Caucasus War. In 1830 Gladky visited the Kuban, but rejected this idea of migrating there, citing the difficulties faced in such a long move for such a small host, and because such a persona would reject subordinating to the supreme authorities of the Black Sea Cossacks. The Tsar instead allowed the Cossacks to remain in Novorossiya provided they found a suitable empty land. Gladky found the territory adjacent to the west of the Don Cossack Host land on the Northern coast of the Azov Sea between Berdyansk and Mariupol (modern Donetsk Oblast, Ukraine).

Thus in 1832, Gladky moved his host to Priazovye which numbered 2,336 Cossacks (including 637 women), and the Azov Cossack Host was officially formed, with Gladky as its Nakazny (appointed) Ataman. They were the only Cossack Host that had a naval role and were tasked in guarding the Black Sea coasts of the Caucasus and Crimea. Because of their initial small size, the peasants of Novospasovka selo were also incorporated into the host. They were joined by numerous volunteers from the Chernigov governorate and in 1839 a group of 217 Nekrasov Cossacks were added to their host.

== Black Sea Coast Guard ==
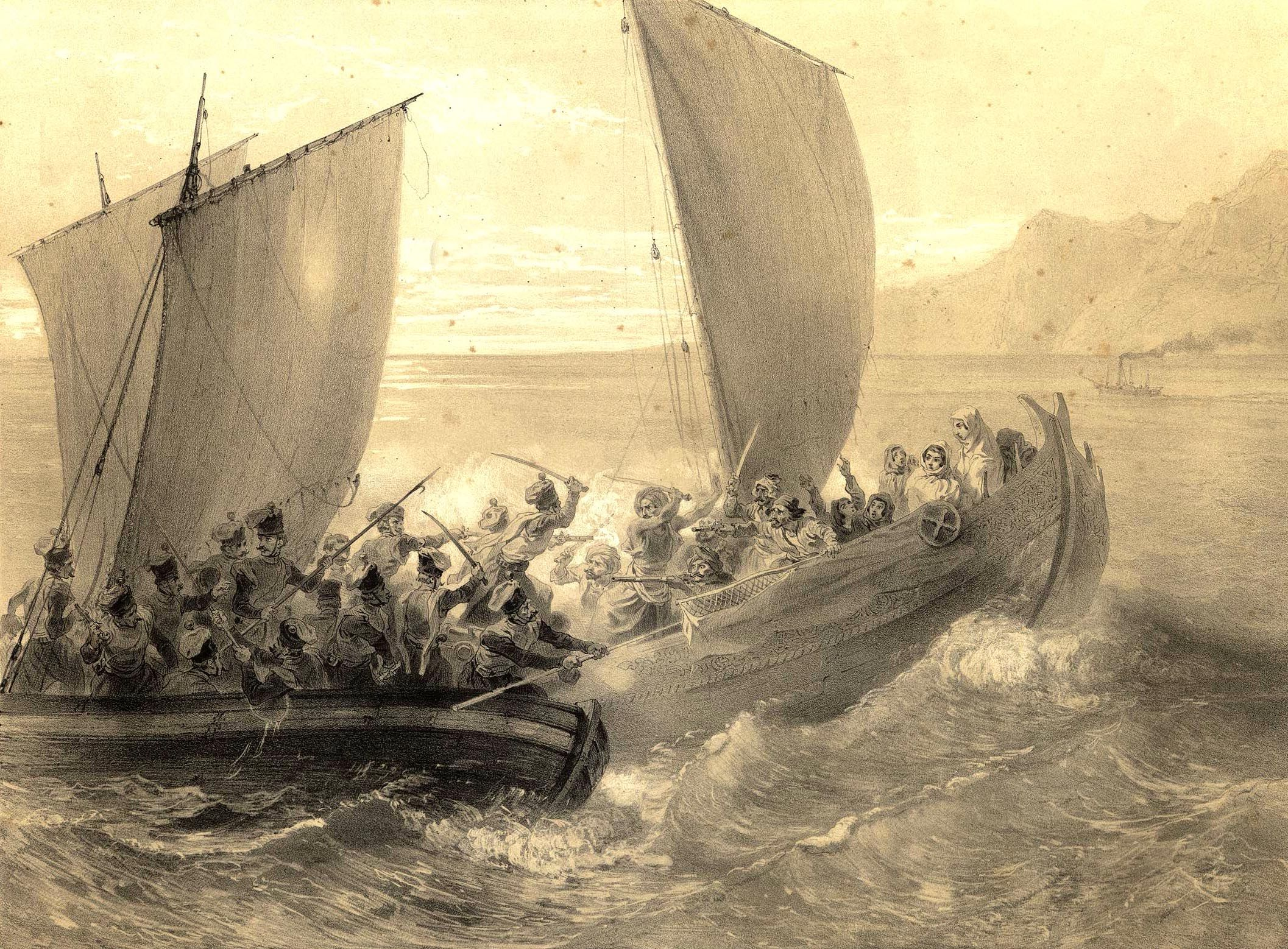
Azov Cossacks fighting Turkish pirates

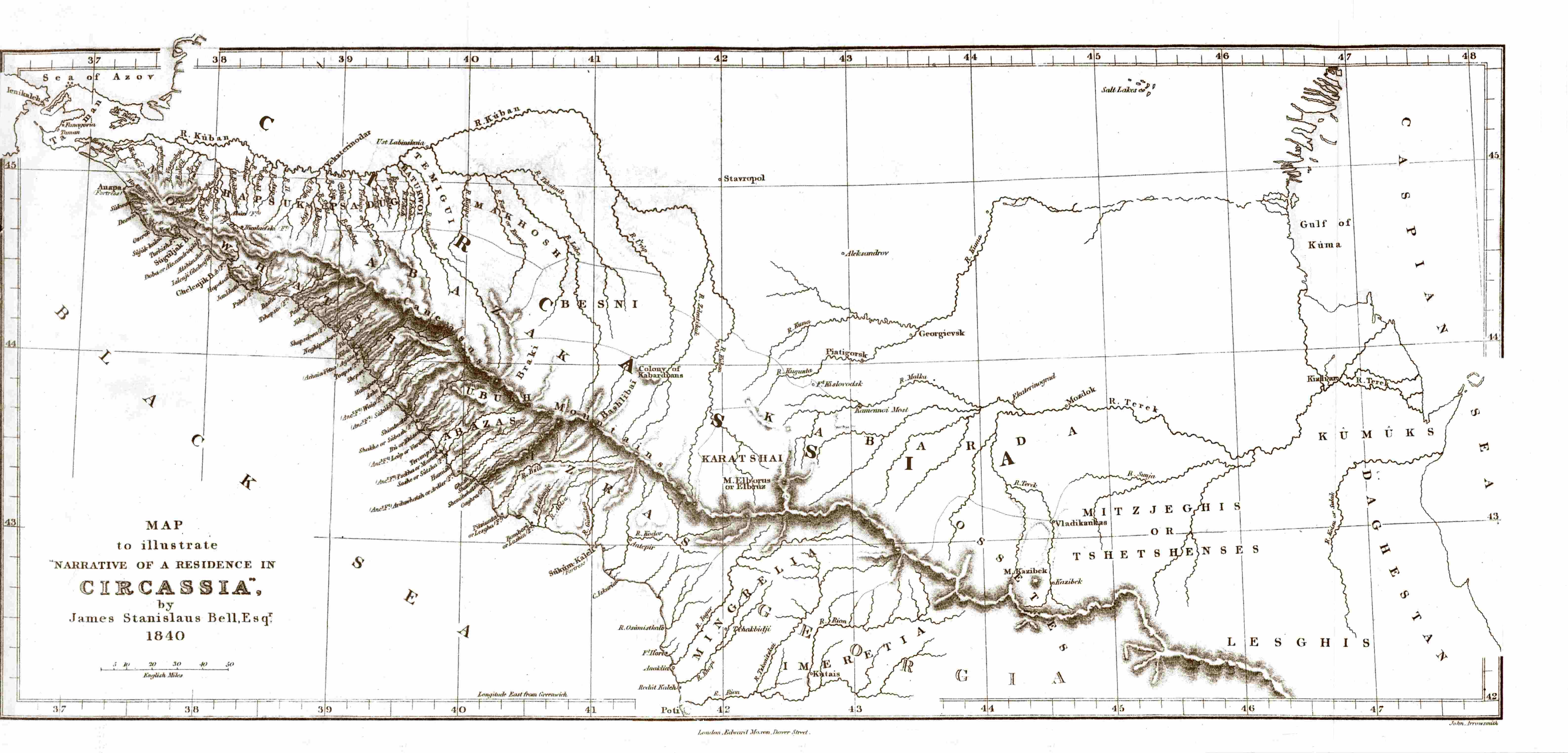
The Azov Cossacks were responsible for patrolling the vast Coast of Circassia

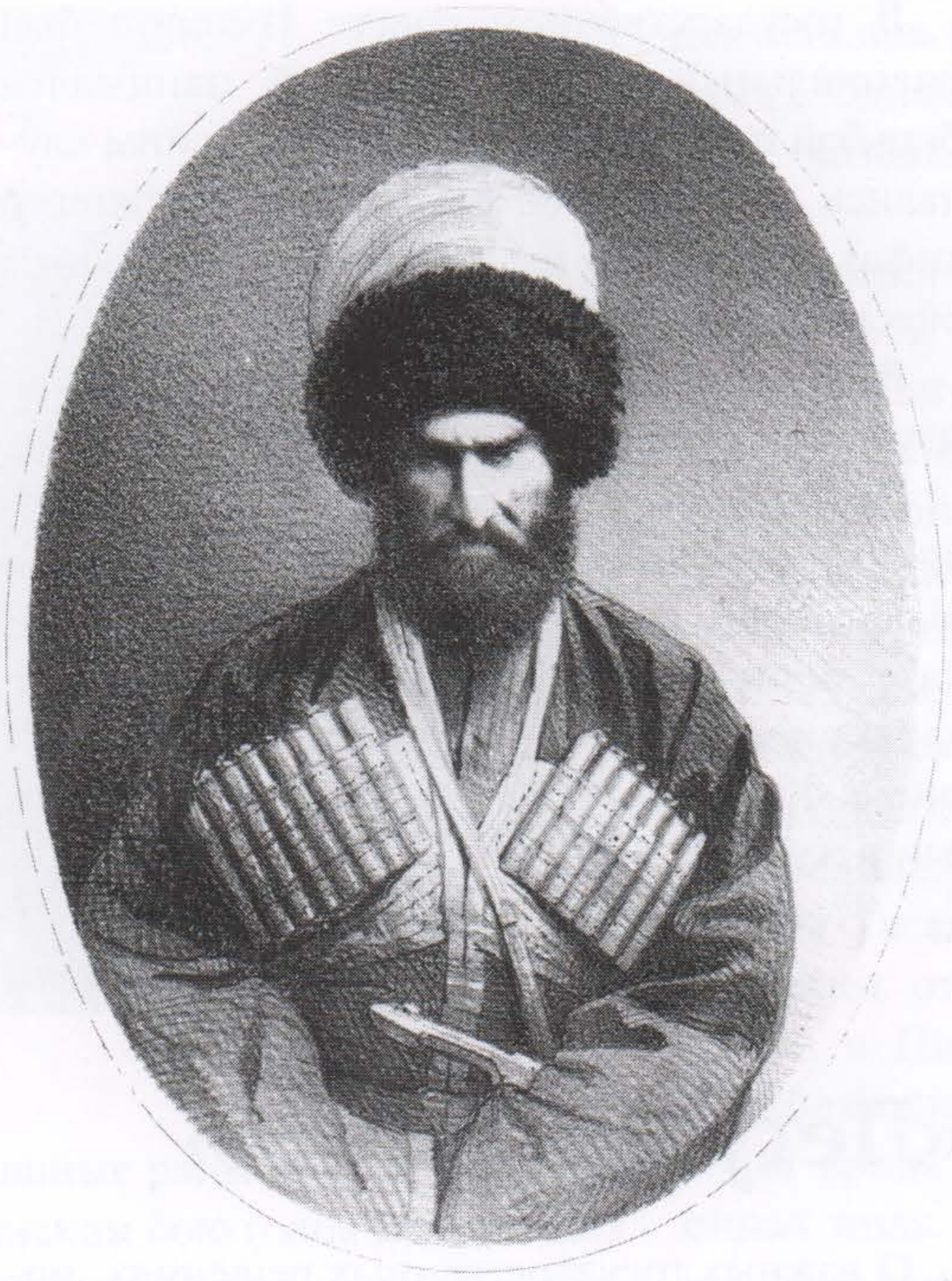
Magomet-Amin

The Azov Host was instantly involved in the Caucasus War, and General Yermolov's aide A.Velyaminov suggested to press the Circassians from the south-western slope of the Caucasus ridge, which runs along the Black Sea from the Strait of Kerch (the mouth of the Azov) all the way to Abkhazia. A defence line was proposed from Anapa all the way to Sukhum. The first marine landings by the Russian Black Sea Fleet took place in 1830 near Gagra, prior to the formation of the Azov Host. After Gladky arrived in 1832, he immediately formed 10 commands numbering 20 Cossacks (later the number of commands was increased to 26) and their specially made barka boats (based in Sukhum and Konstantinovka) were regularly carrying out pre-landing reconnaissance and offered fire support to the Russian marines and sailors who were faced with conquering the very difficult landings.

The Azov Cossacks also helped to intercept numerous English, French and Turkish contraband supplies, and in 1835 off the coast of Novorossiysk they destroyed two Schooners and later captured the English cargo ship Vixen which carried a whole arsenal of illegal rifles. However, despite the success in 1839 Imam Shamil sent his naib Magomet-Amin who instead of rallying the Circassians on the northern Kuban approach, unleashed them onto the Black Sea line in 1840. Outnumbered and after several Russian forts and garrisons were overrun, it was decided to abandon the Black Sea Coast and the Azov Cossacks proved their importance in evacuating the surviving Russian units.

Despite the unsuccessful operation in building the line, the Russian evacuation did not affect the Azov Cossacks' role in patrolling the Black Sea Coast. In 1845 the 26 commands were re-organized into two groups. The first one numbering 147 Cossacks and 7 Starshinas patrolling the coast from Anapa where they were based to Navaginsk fort (modern Sochi), and the southern group numbering 164 Cossacks with 20 officers from Svyatogo Dukha to Svyatogo Nikolaya (Sukhum). During the following years, as quoted by General M.Rayevsky The Azov Cossacks recommended themselves as a potent force and stroke fear to the captains of contraband ships and Circassian galleys. The success of the Azov Cossacks led to a plan being drawn in 1843 to once again re-settle them to the whole Black Sea Coast from Mingrelia to the mouth of the Kuban river. This however was never realised.

== Crimean War ==
After the events of 1848 it became clear that Russia was en route to another major conflict between Ottoman Empire and her new allies Britain and France. The Azov Cossack Host's first job was to sabotage the remaining Russian strongholds on the Caucasus coast, which they themselves have built. After the British and French navies penetrated the Strait of Kerch and entered the Sea of Azov, they planned to navigate up the Don River to force the Russian armies en route to re-inforce Crimea to divert the attention. The Azov Host (by that point mobilising 1,920 men) was tasked with preventing the enemy from reaching the Don, a task which they accomplished (see Siege of Taganrog).

However, in addition to guarding the Don, and their Black Sea duties in Novorossiysk, the Azov Cossacks were constantly involved in guarding their own home, and Gladky formed three irregular units a naval battalion numbering 722 Cossacks, an infantry battalion with 400 more and a cavalry sotnia which had further 104 Cossacks.

However the weakly defended Strait of Kerch meant that in May 1855 a squadron of 57 English and French ships (17,400 men in total) easily overpowered the Russian garrison there and entered the Azov bassin. Afterwards the enemy approached Berdyansk and bombarded the city from the sea. Similar attacks were experienced by Petrovskaya Stanitsa, Mariupol and numerous other locations on the coast of the northern Azov. Yet any attempts to land troops on the shores, turned out to be complete failures. When attempting to land at the headquarters of the Azov Host Petrovsky Posad (modern Nikolske, Ukraine) the Anglo-French troops demanded the Cossacks surrender and sent their landing party of 100 boats. None were to reach the shores. Afterwards the survivors of the failed landing returned to the ships the squadron tried to land near Taganrog, but a similar fate awaited them from the hands of the Don Cossacks.

After the end of the war in 1856 all of the units, save the ones which resumed their previous patrolling of the Caucasus coast were disbanded. The Azov Host was awarded with the highest award that a Russian military unit could earn, the Banner of St. George whose inscription read: For exceptional bravery and excellent service during the war against the French, English and Turks in 1853-1858

== The end of the Azov Host ==
After the Crimean War, Gladky attaining rank of General-Colonel retired and moved to Aleksandrovsk (modern Zaporizhzhia) where he died in 1866. However the Northern shore of the Azov, during the 30 years of the Cossack presence became a prosperous region, where the Cossacks numbering 10 thousand men were involved in fishery, farming and trade. In 1860 however the Caucasus War approached its decisive finale, and Russian General Nikolay Yevdokimov initiated several reforms of the Caucasus Hosts, forming the Kuban and Terek Cossack Hosts out of the previous Black Sea, Caucasus Line Hosts.

The Circassian front, particularly the Western Caucasus, after decades of stationary action began a process of capturing Circassian land and moving the peaceful Circassians from mountains to the ravines, and expelling (see Muhajir (Caucasus)) those hostile to Ottoman Empire. To help settle the empty mountainous land, Yevdokimov suggested to Emperor Alexander II to bring the Azov Cossacks, whose military role by now was expiring, as the Imperial Russian Navy in the Black Sea has made provisions for taking over their coast guard roles.

Originally Yevdokimov proposed to move 800 Cossack and eight officer families to the Western Caucasus with financial compensation and free transport promised to them. After freeing those who lacked elder sons, adolescent orphans and those older than 45 or were sick to travel, it was planned to use the draw method of selection. However no draw was required. Most Cossacks who were descendants of the Danubian Sich, the Nekrasovites (Nikolskaya and Pokrovskaya stanitsas) as well as the Cossacks of the Starodubskaya stanitsa (descendants of Chernigov migrants, whose ancestors were Cossacks in the Sloboda) agreed to move to the Kuban. Whilst the dwellers of the Novospasskaya and Petrovskaya stanitsas who were local peasants and traders that were enlisted into Cossackdom in 1832 chose to stay.

All in all 1093 families (5224 people) nearly half of the Azov Host left the Azov in 1862 and were settled in the stanitsas of the Abinsk and Adagumsk Regiments of the Kuban Cossack Host. They participated in the finale of the Caucasus War which ended two years later in 1864. Afterwards, the ex-Azov Cossacks became fully integrated into the Kuban Host shared their history since. To this day their descendants live in the mountainous stanitsas of modern Krasnodar Krai and Adygea in Russia.

The remaining Azov region was passed to the Yekaterinoslav Governorate and afterwards to the Ukrainian SSR, where the former Petrovskaya stanitsa was renamed to Volodarske in 1924 (modern Donetsk Oblast). At present there are attempts to spread the knowledge of the Cossack heritage that the region has, despite the fact that all Don Cossacks were eradicated in 1921.
