= Danube Cossacks =

Danube Cossacks may refer to either:

- the Danubian Sich (an exiled Zaporozhian Cossack Host which lived in the Ottoman Controlled Danube 1778-1828)
- the Danube Cossack Host (A Russian Cossack Host that lived in the Budjak Territory from 1828 to 1868)
