= Cossacks in Turkey =

Cossacks in Turkey refers to descendants of a group of Don Cossacks who had lived in the territory of the Republic of Turkey until they migrated in 1962 to South Russia.

== History ==
A group of Don Cossacks took part in the Bulavin Rebellion in opposition to reforms of Peter the Great. After their defeat, starting from 1737, they began to take refuge in the Ottoman Empire and moved from the Kuban region where some of them, known as Nekrasov Cossacks, had settled earlier. A group settled around Constanţa on the Black Sea coast, while another group settled on the shores of Lake Manyas in northwestern Anatolia in 1740. In 1883, the group in Romania moved to Anatolia, first to settle on Mada Island on Lake Beyşehir, then to the shores of Lake Akşehir in Central Anatolia.

In a separate event after the dissolution of the Zaporozhian Host and the destruction of the Zaporozhian Sich, up to 5000 Cossacks fled to the Turkish-controlled Danube Delta where the Sultan allowed them to form the Danubian Sich. After several bloody clashes with Nekrasovites, resulting in most of them to either return to Russia or re-located to Manyas, and their support for Turkey against the Greeks during the Greek War of Independence, the Danubian Sich ended in 1828. Some returned to Russia, whilst others were moved to central Turkey and worked in forced labour.

As of 1927, there were three Cossack villages in Turkey: Eski Kazaklar (later officially renamed as Kocagöl, the earlier settlement on the southwestern tip of Lake Manyas) and Yeni Kazaklar (founded by a community that left Eski Kazaklar and located on the northern shore of Lake Manyas) in Manyas district of Balıkesir Province, and Kazak (on the eastern shore of Lake Akşehir) in Akşehir district of Konya Province. Their main economic activity was fishery which they taught to their native neighbors.

In 1927, residents of Yeni Kazaklar left Turkey. Cossacks of Eski Kazaklar and Kazak decided to migrate in 1962, most Eski Kazaklar villagers repatriating to Russia, while most residents of Kazak chose to settle in Woodburn, Oregon, U.S.A.

== See also ==
- Danubian Sich
- Hamidiye
- Nekrasov Cossacks
- Old Believers
