= Ərtəpə =

- Municipality
- Location within Azerbaijan
- Coordinates: 40°38′38″N 45°53′55″E
- Country: Azerbaijan
- Rayon: Gadabay

Population
  - Total: 1,487
- Time zone: UTC+4 (AZT)
  - Summer (DST): UTC+5 (AZT)

Ərtəpə (known as Novogorelovka until 1991) is a village and municipality in the Gadabay Rayon of Azerbaijan. It has a population of 1,487. The municipality consists of the villages of Ərtəpə, Pirbulaq, and Soyuqbulaq.
