= Danube Cossack Host =

Cossack host in the Russian Empire (1828–1868)

Danube Cossack Host Дунайське козацьке військо
- 1828–1868
- Demonym: Danube Cossacks
- Government: Cossack Host
- Historical era: Early modern period
  - Established: 1828
  - Disestablished: 1868
Preceded by	Succeeded by
Danubian Sich	Bessarabia Governorate
- Today part of: Moldova; Romania; Ukraine

The Danube Cossack Host (Ukrainian: Дунайське козацьке військо) was a Ukrainian Cossack Host formed in 1828, before the Russo-Turkish War (1828–1829). It was formed by descendants of the Zaporozhian Cossacks who lived in Bessarabia, especially in the Budjak region. A Ukrainian Cossack Host called the Lower Danube Budjak Host had been formed in the same area in 1807, but was disbanded shortly thereafter. The Danube Host included volunteers from various groups, such as the Nekrasov Cossacks, Romanians, Serbs, and Bulgarians. At first, the Cossacks controlled three selos in the Akkerman Poviat: Akmangit, Starokazachye, and Volonterovka.

== Overview ==
After the Russo-Turkish war, the Host was assigned to guard the borders of the Bessarabian and Kherson governorates. It had outposts in Odesa, Izmail, and Akkerman, which also served as its central headquarters. When Wallachia was administered by Russia, the Tsar expected all remaining Nekrasov Cossacks in the Danube Delta to join the Danube Host. However, most refused further military service. In 1839, Russia, concerned about the extent of local Romani activity, proposed that Roma be drafted as Cossacks. Although most Roma declined the offer, those who accepted made up nearly a quarter of the Cossacks in the Host.

During the Crimean War, the Danube Cossacks became famous for using rocket artillery in the capture of Tulcea, Isaccea and Măcin. This artillery supported the main armies in covering their bridgeheads and preventing the Turkish army from crossing the Danube. As a result of their success, both Danube Cossack regiments were awarded the Georgian Banners. After the Treaty of Paris in 1856, Russia ceded part of the Budjak territory. As a result, the Host moved to Stanitsa Nikolayevka-Novorossiyskaya (a modern selo within Odesa Oblast, Ukraine). The Host lost access to the Danube River and was subsequently renamed the Novorossiyan Cossack Host (Russian: Новороссийское Казачье Войско) in 1856.

By 1858, the new Host had 10 stanitsa and numbered twelve thousand men. Over the next decade, however, during a period of relative peace, most lost their combat skills and became involved in internal customs and police work. In 1868, as a result of the administrative reform of Emperor Alexander II, the Host was disbanded and most of the Cossacks continued their service in the customs and police work, but now under the civil administration.
