= Soyuqbulaq, Gadabay =

Village in the Gadabay Rayon of Azerbaijan

Soyuqbulaq
- Location within Azerbaijan
- Coordinates: 40°35′54″N 45°53′32″E
- Country: Azerbaijan
- Rayon: Gadabay
- Municipality: Ərtəpə
- Time zone: UTC+4 (AZT)
  - Summer (DST): UTC+5 (AZT)

Soyuqbulaq (also, Soyukbulaq) is a village in the Gadabay Rayon of Azerbaijan. The village forms part of the municipality of Ərtəpə.
