= Soyuqbulaq, Lachin =

Soyugbulag
- Azerbaijani: Soyuqbulaq
- Location within Azerbaijan Location within East Zangezur Economic Region
- Coordinates: 39°41′39″N 46°23′35″E
- Country: Azerbaijan
- District: Lachin
- Time zone: UTC+4 (AZT)
  - Summer (DST): UTC+5 (AZT)

Soyuqbulaq (also, Soyugbulag) is a village in the Lachin District of Azerbaijan.
