= Pirbulaq =

- Location within Azerbaijan
- Coordinates: 40°36′41″N 45°54′05″E
- Country: Azerbaijan
- Rayon: Gadabay
- Municipality: Ərtəpə
- Time zone: UTC+4 (AZT)
  - Summer (DST): UTC+5 (AZT)

Pirbulaq (known as Novospasovka until 1991) is a village in the Gadabay Rayon of Azerbaijan. The village forms part of the municipality of Ərtəpə.
