= Soyuqbulaq, Jalilabad =

Soyuqbulaq
- Municipality
- Location within Azerbaijan
- Coordinates: 39°07′37″N 48°27′43″E
- Country: Azerbaijan
- Rayon: Jalilabad
- Time zone: UTC+4 (AZT)
  - Summer (DST): UTC+5 (AZT)

Soyuqbulaq (known as Kövüzbulaq until 2015) is a village and municipality in the Jalilabad Rayon of Azerbaijan.
