= Danubian Sich =

1778–1828 Cossack polity in the Danube Delta

Danubian Sich Задунайська Сiч (Ukrainian) Siciul Dunărean (Romanian)
- 1775–1828
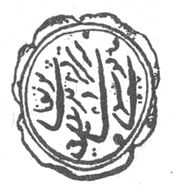
- Seal of the Transdanubian Cossack Army from the beginning of the 19th century.

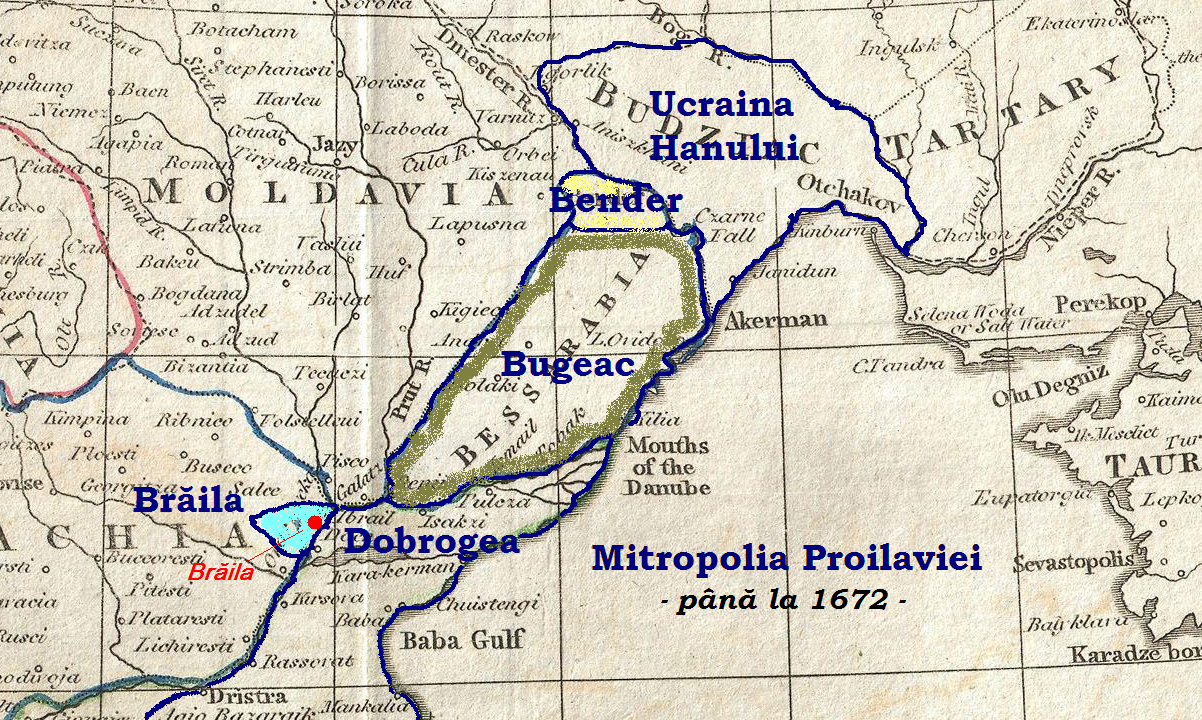
- Metropolitan bishopric of Proilava (Brăila)
- Common languages: Ukrainian, Romanian
- Religion: Eastern Orthodox
- Demonym: Zaporozhian Cossacks
- Government: Cossack Republic
- Historical era: Ottoman Empire (Silistra Eyalet)
  - Established: 1775
  - Disestablished: 1828
Preceded by	Succeeded by
Nova Sich	Danube Cossack Host
- Today part of: Moldova; Romania; Ukraine

The Danubian Sich (Ukrainian: Задунайська Сiч, romanized: Zadunaiska Sich, lit. 'Transdanubian sich') was an organization of the part of former Zaporozhian Cossacks who settled in the territory of the Ottoman Empire (the Danube Delta, hence the name) after their previous host was disbanded and the Zaporozhian Sich was destroyed in 1775.

In 1863, Semen Hulak-Artemovsky wrote his libretto Zaporozhets za Dunayem in Saint Petersburg to commemorate the exodus of Zaporizhian Cossacks to the Danube, an area of Silistra Eyalet. The Cossacks were protecting the Metropolitan bishop of Brăila who serviced the area of Budjak and Yedisan (Ottoman Ukraine) and was titled as Metropolitan bishop of all Ukraine.

== End of Zaporozhia ==
By the late 18th century, the combat ability of Zaporozhia was greatly reduced, especially after the Treaty of Küçük Kaynarca and the Russian annexation of Crimea, when the need for the Host to guard the borders was removed. At the same time, the Zaporozhian's other enemy, the Polish–Lithuanian Commonwealth, was also weakened and on the verge of being partitioned. This meant that militarily the Zaporozhian Sich was becoming increasingly superfluous, but at the same time their existence caused friction with Imperial Russian authorities who wanted to colonise the newly acquired lands that the Cossacks inhabited. After a number of Cossack attacks on Serbian colonies and with Cossack support offered to Yemelyan Pugachev, the Russian Empress Catherine the Great issued an order to General Peter Tekeli to end the troublesome Sich.

Tekeli's operation, carried out in June 1775, was bloodless. The Zaporozhian Sich was surrounded with infantry and artillery and an ultimatum was given to the Kosh otaman Petro Kalnyshevsky to destroy the Sich and to have Zaporozhian knights transfer to the family life. The Cossacks did not resist so that no Russian blood would be spilt. But later Zaporozhian Cossack Grigory Potemkin, and apparently without Kalnyshevky's knowledge, reached an agreement to allow a group of 50 Cossacks under the guidance of a starshyna Lyakh to go fishing in the river Ingul next to the Southern Buh in Ottoman territory and to issue 50 passports. The pretext was enough to allow the Russians to let the Cossacks, as 50 passports allowed five thousand Cossacks to leave (approximately 30% of the Zaporozhian Cossacks). As long as Potemkin could be guilty, so starshyna, including Kalnyshevsky, was arrested for this.

These Cossacks were joined by numerous Ukrainian peasants fleeing from Russian Serfdom and lived on the left bank of the Danube river (Budjak) then part of the Ottoman Empire, who allowed them to settle there. By 1778, they numbered 12 thousand men, and the Turkish Sultan decided that they would have much more use as a Cossack Host, and allocated them the land of Kuchungary (modern Transnistria) in the lower Dniester where they swore loyalty to the Ottoman Empire. However the outbreak of the Russo-Turkish War divided the Cossacks. Some returned to Russia and joined the new Host of Loyal Zaporozhians (later the Black Sea Cossack Host) formed out of the Cossacks who chose to remain in Russia in 1775. After the Russo-Turkish War (1806–12), Bessarabia became part of Russia, and the Danubian Cossacks lost their allocated land.

== Rivalry with Nekrasovites ==
Following Turkey's defeat, some Cossacks retreated with the Turkish Army across the Danube River, where the Sultan allowed them to build a Sich in the settlement of Katerlez in the Danube Delta right next to existing settlements of Nekrasov Cossacks and Lipovans. There was increasing friction between the two groups over land and fishing rights. In 1794, the Nekrasovites attacked and destroyed Katerlez. Afterwards the Turkish authorities re-located the Danubian Zaporozhians further up the Danube on the Great Brăila Island. The new location was much poorer for fishing and resulted in a group of 500 Cossacks, led by Kosh Pomelo to return to Russia.

In 1800, the Balkan Peninsula erupted in uprisings led by Osman Pazvantoğlu who rebelled against the new Turkish Sultan Selim III. In order to gain support, Pazvantoğlu promised the Nekrasovites all the land on the lower Danube. Seeing an opportunity to settle the score with their rivals, the Danubian Zaporozhians sided with the Sultan. The resulting Civil War saw severe losses in both Cossack groups. In the end the rebellion was put down, the Zaprozhians where rewarded by the Brailov Nazir, who allowed then to return to Katerlez in 1803. However the Nekrasovites found their own protector, the commandant of Izmail Pekhlevanoğlu. With his aid, they attacked the Sich once again in 1805 and sacked it. The surviving Zaporozhians fled to Brailov (modern Brăila, Romania).

The new Russo-Turkish War (1806–1812) caused further division among the Danubian Cossacks. After Russia overran the Danube, the Kosh Otaman Trofim Gaibadura and Ivan Guba offered their allegiance to Russia. They were permitted to settle in the Budjak region and by order of Alexander I and on 20 January 1807 formed the Lower-Danube Budjak Host (Усть-Дунайское Буджацкое Войско). The new host lasted only five months, during which many neighbouring Ukrainian and Moldovan landowners complained about their serfs running off to Kiliya (modern Ukraine) and Galats (modern Galaţi, Romania) where the Host was based. Therefore, on 20 June, the host, which by that point numbered only 1387 men, was disbanded. Approximately 500 of them moved to the Kuban. This caused many of the remaining Danubians, who initially wished to follow the Kosh and move to Russia, to reconsider.

After negotiations with the Russian General Kutuzov, many Nekrasovites were pardoned and allowed to move to Russia. The 1812 Treaty of Bucharest resulted in the Buhjak becoming part of Russia. With the old rivalry still strong, the Zaporozhian Danubians once again attacked their enemy, and in 1813 retook Katerlez. After a very brutal conflict, which shocked even the Turkish authorities, Zaporozhians captured the Nekrasovite capital Upper Dunavets (modern Romania) in 1814 . There they founded their final Sich. Many Nekrasov Cossacks were later re-located to Anatolia, while those who remained mixed with Lipovans and old-believers among the Danubian Cossacks.

== Service to the Sultan ==
After a few years of peace, trouble once again came to the Balkans, with the outbreak of the Greek War of Independence. In 1821, the Russian-Greek commander Alexander Ypsilantis moved the Eterian Greeks from Russia to Wallachia. The Danubian Cossacks, under command of Kosh Nikifor Beluha, assisted in the defeat of this incursion. Afterwards five thousand Cossacks under the Kosh Semen Moroz were sent to Greece to fight for the Turks. In 1824 they took part in the storming of Messolonghi. Many died there, and Moroz himself was killed in the naval battle off the island of Chios.

During this time the Danube Sich reached its height, numbering 10,000-15,000 men, and controlling all of the Danube delta region with six villages being in personal control of the Kosh. In the Upper Dunavets there were 38 kurens under old traditional names of the Zaporozhian Sich. However, the new Sich was noticeably different from its predecessor. There were no longer any Host Starshynas, and only un-married Cossacks were considered as eligible for service. Polkovnyks were assigned temporarily by the Kosh. The Host lacked any cavalry, only infantry in boats. The social structure also began to fragment; instead of the former equality of all Cossacks, many fishing, tradesmen and landowners became the Rayah. In order to gain permission to do so, there had to be at least a marriage link to a Cossack family.

== End ==
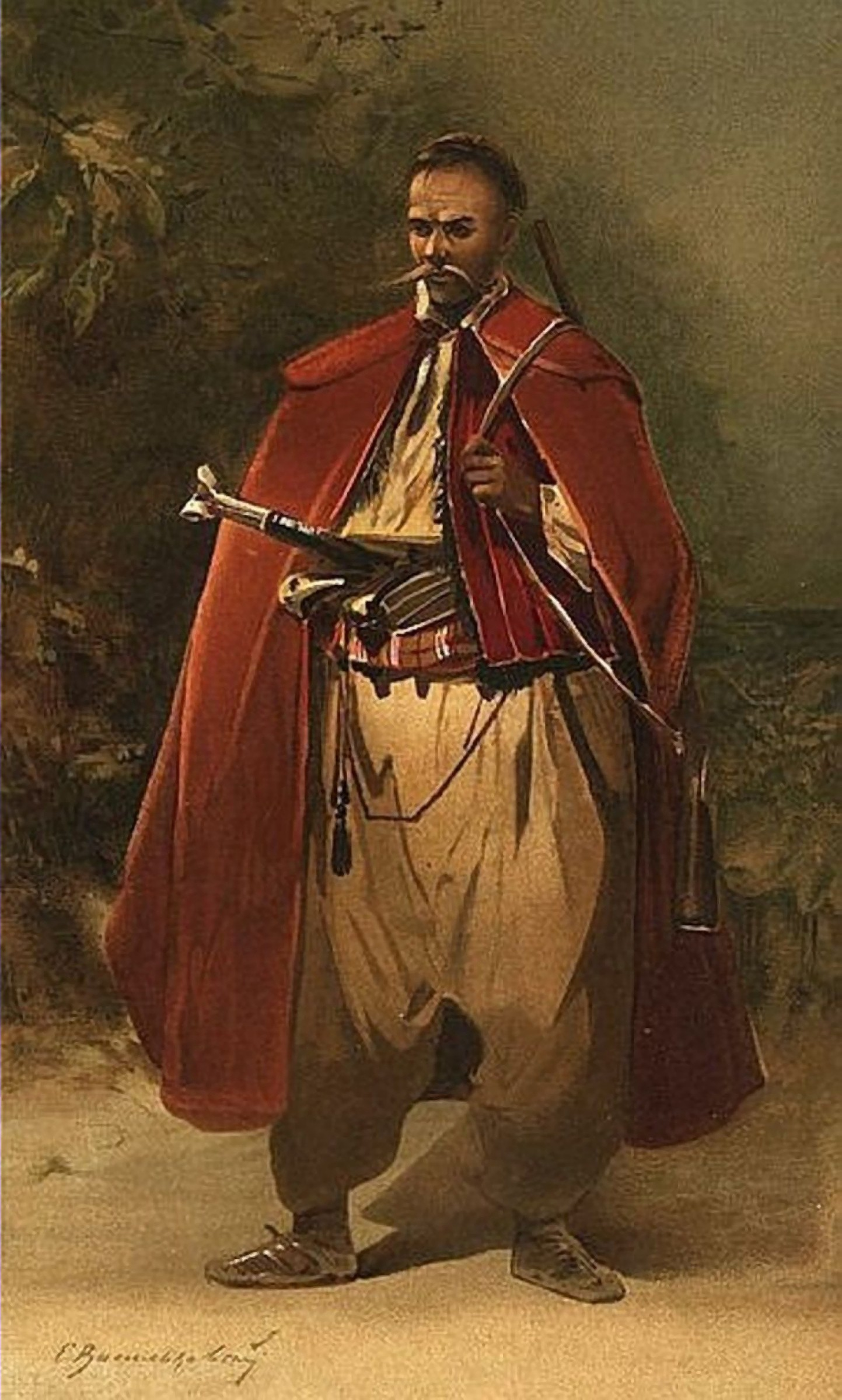
Serhiy Vasylkivsky's painting of a Danubian Sich Cossack.

In 1825, Kosh otaman Lytvyn promised to send another expedition to Greece but fled the Sich without any trace. The events in Greece once again affected relations between Turkey and Russia, and a new Russo-Turkish War broke out. Among the Danubian Cossacks there was as ever a pro-Russian and a pro-Turkish split. The former were willing to return to Russia if a pardon was given. Learning of this, the head (Hradonachalik) of Izmail S.A. Tuchkov entered into secret negotiations with Kosh Vasily Nezmayevsky (1827). The conditions were set to allow the whole Host to return to Russia. Despite being a Russophile, Nezmayevsky was not ready to accept such a move.

With the outbreak of the new Russo-Turkish War (1828–1829), the Russian Army under command of Field-Marshal Peter Wittgenstein advanced. Threatening to overrun the Sich, the Sultan wished to relocate it to Adrianopol (modern Edirne, Turkey) and ordered the Kosh to rally the Danubian Army to Silistra (modern Bulgaria). The new Kosh otaman was Osyp Hladky, originally from a rich landowner family from Poltava who in 1820 had left his home to earn a living, but after a few failed business attempts in Crimea and Odessa, had left Russia and joined the Sich in 1822. He took part in the campaign against Messolonghi and afterwards was elected to be a Kuren Ataman of the Platnyrovsky Kuren. After the failed negotiations with Nezmayevsky, Tuchkov approached Hladky, who upon the Kosh elections held on Pokrov (1 October) was elected to be the Kosh Ataman.

Hladky only gathered those that he suspected of having a pro-Turkish allegiance (about two thousand men) and set out for Silistra. After reaching there, he asked to return to the Sich to gather more. When he returned, he instead called for a Cossack Rada and announced his decision to side the whole Sich with Russia. On 30 (18) May 1828, Hladky along with 218 Cossacks and 578 Rayah crossed the Danube with all the Sich regalia, treasury and prized possessions. After landing on the left bank, they were taken to the Russian headquarters where they knelt before Emperor Nicholas I himself, who was quoted saying:

God will forgive you, the Motherland forgives you, and I too forgive

—

The Danubian Cossacks were fully pardoned for their past, and managed to win over the Tsar's trust, which was confirmed when the Russian Army Crossed the Danube, as Nicholas was in the same boat that Hladky had initially came over in, with Kosh Polkovnyks rowing. The Tsar let the Danubians form a new Special Zaporozhian Host (Отдельное Запорожное Войско), with Hladky as the appointed Ataman. The new Host was small with only a five infantry sotnias (~100 men each) and came under the control of the Danube flotilla. Despite the small number of men, they soon became a prized asset due to their knowledge of the complicated Danube Delta. They proved themselves in combat in the storming of Isaccea, and 10 Cossacks were awarded the Cross of St. George.

For those Danubian Sich Cossacks who refused to follow Hladky, their fate was tragic. Learning of Hladky's betrayal, the Sultan called upon the Janissary corps to raze the Sich, massacre its population and burn down its church. Even those that were in Silistra were disarmed and sent to forced labour deep in Turkey.

== Aftermath ==
After the war ended, Russia remained to administer the Danubian Principalities. Nicholas I decided to form yet another new Cossack group the Danube Cossack Host, which was to include descendants of the Zaporozhians who fled Russia in 1775 but did not join the Sultan and instead settled in Bessarabia. In addition it included loyal Nekrasovites as well as many volunteers from the Balkan peoples. It was based in the many historical refuge areas, where over the previous decades many Cossacks fleeing from Turkey found sanctuary such as Akkerman.

There were plans to relocate the Danubian Cossack Host to the Kuban, where Gladky visited in 1830. But the Caucasus War was in full swing, and the long journey for such a small group would have been too difficult. Instead the Tsar allowed Gladky to remain in Novorossiya and find a piece of land that was uninhabited (Rather than just let them remain). Gladky chose the northern coast of the Azov Sea, next to Berdyansk. In May 1832, Gladky carried his men over to the new land and there they formed the Azov Cossack Host. Initially numbering 2336 people (including 687 women), the new Host was the only Cossack force in Russia which had a Naval role, acting as a coast guard for the Caucasus and Crimean coasts, by defending them from Turkish and Circassian raiders.

The remaining Cossacks who managed to escape the Sultan's vengeance, but did not return to Russia moved to the Danube Delta, where in 1830 they numbered 1,095 families. Over the years they were joined by other peasants fleeing serfdom in the Russian Empire. To date there is still a small Ukrainian minority living in the Dobruja region around Ukraine and Romania. In 1992, they numbered four thousand people according to official Romanian statistics while the local community claims to number 20,000. Known as Rusnaks they continue to pursue the traditional Cossack lifestyle of hunting and fishing.

== Legacy ==
The legacy of the Danube Cossacks survived in a lyrical-comic opera called "A Zaprorozhian Cossack beyond the Danube" (Zaporozhetz za Dunayem) composed in the 1850s by Semen Hulak-Artemovsky, a student of Mikhail Glinka. Although the opera historically relates to the aftermath of the Russo-Turkish war of 1828-9, where according to a peace treaty, the Danube cossacks were granted the right to return to their homeland, Hulak-Artemovsky reset the opera to take place in the 18th century. The opera first opened in St. Petersburg at the Mariinsky Theatre on 14 March 1863. After its premiere it was censored and restricted from performance. In the 1870s it was revived by amateur Ukrainian theatre troupes and received a new lease on life. Today it is considered a Ukrainian opera classic.

== See also ==
- Ottoman Ukraine
- Azov Cossacks
