= Zaporozhian Cossacks =

Ukrainian ethnic group

The Zaporozhian Cossacks (Note: Ukrainian: Запорозькі козаки, romanized: Zaporozki kozaky) or Zaporizhian Cossacks, (Note: Ukrainian: Запорізькі козаки, romanized: Zaporizki kozaky) also known as the Zaporozhian Cossack Army or the Zaporozhian Host, were Cossacks who lived downstream of the Dnieper Rapids. They were predominantly Ruthenians, but also included other ethnic groups (most notably their kish otaman Ivan Sirko was of Moldavian origin). Scientific studies conducted on the Zaporozhian Cossack genetics show that their Y-chromosomal genetic makeup forms the southern fragment of East Slavic population, with minimal levels to absence of Caucasian and Asian component in their paternal gene pool. Along with Registered Cossacks and Sloboda Cossacks, Zaporozhian Cossacks played an important role in the history of Ukraine and the ethnogenesis of Ukrainians.

The Zaporozhian Sich grew rapidly in the 15th century from serfs fleeing the more controlled parts of the Polish–Lithuanian Commonwealth. The least controlled region, that was located between the Dniester and mid-Volga was first known from the 15th century as the Wild Fields, which was subject to colonization by the Zaporozhian Cossacks. Zaporozhian Host became established as a well-respected political entity with a parliamentary system of government. During the course of the 16th, 17th and well into the 18th century, the Zaporozhian Cossacks were a strong political and military force that challenged the authority of the Polish–Lithuanian Commonwealth, the Tsardom of Russia, and the Crimean Khanate.

The host went through a series of conflicts and alliances involving the three powers, including supporting an uprising in the 18th century. Their leader signed a treaty with the Russians. This group was forcibly disbanded in the late 18th century by the Russian Empire, with much of the population relocated to the Kuban region on the south edge of the Russian Empire, while others founded cities in southern Ukraine and eventually became state peasants. The Cossacks served a valuable role of conquering the Caucasian tribes and in return enjoyed considerable freedom granted by the Tsars.

== Etymology ==
The name Zaporozhtsi comes from the location of their fortress, the Sich, in Zaporizhzhia (lit. "land beyond the rapids"), from Ukrainian za "beyond" and poróhy "rapids".

As for Cossacks, Max Vasmer's etymological dictionary traces the name to the Tatar Turkic word kazak, kozak, in which cosac meant 'free man' but also 'conqueror'. The ethnonym Kazakh is from the same Turkic root. In written sources, the name is first attested in the Codex Cumanicus from the 13th century. In English, Cossack is first attested in 1590. Combined, Zaporizhian Cossacks may thus be understood as "the free people from the land beyond the rapids".

== Origins ==
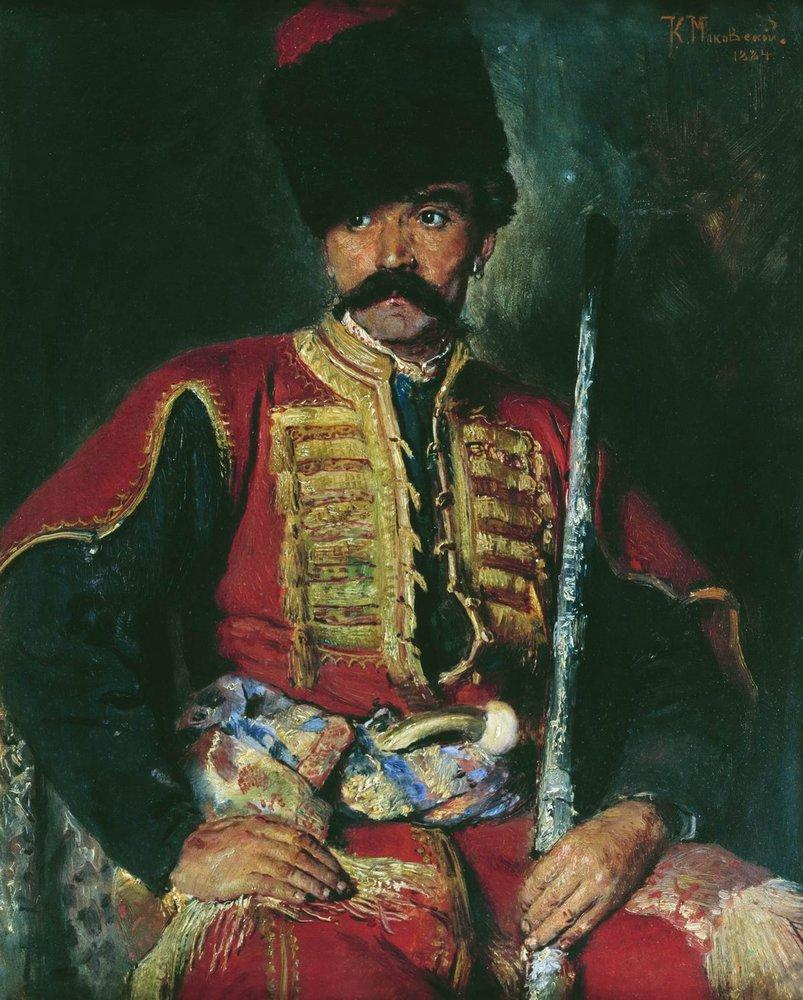
Zaporozhian Cossack by Konstantin Makovsky, 1884

It is not clear when the first Cossack communities on the Lower Dnieper began to form. There are signs and stories of similar people living in the Eurasian Steppe as early as the 12th century. At that time they were not called Cossacks, since cossack is a word that also in Turkic language means a "free man" which shares its etymology with the ethnonym "Kazakh". It later became a Ruthenian (Middle Ukrainian) and Muscovite (Middle Russian) word for "freebooter." The steppes to the north of the Black Sea were inhabited by nomadic tribes such as the Cumans, Pechenegs and Khazars. The role of these tribes in the ethnogenesis of the Cossacks is disputed, although later Cossack sources claimed a Slavicised Khazar ancestry.

There were also groups of people who fled into these wild steppes from the cultivated lands of Kievan Rus' in order to escape oppression or criminal pursuit. Their lifestyle largely resembled that of the people now called Cossacks. They survived chiefly from hunting and fishing and raiding Asiatic tribes for horses and food, but they also mixed with these nomads as well adopting a lot of their cultural traits. In the 16th century, a great organizer, Dmytro Vyshnevetsky, a Ruthenian noble from Ukraine, united these different groups into a strong military organization.

The Zaporozhian Cossacks had various social and ethnic origins but were predominantly made up of escaped serfs who preferred the dangerous freedom of the wild steppes, rather than life under the rule of Polish (or Polonised) aristocrats. However, townspeople, lesser noblemen and even Crimean Tatars also became part of the Cossack host. They had to accept Eastern Orthodoxy as their religion and adopt its rituals and prayers.

The nomadic hypothesis was that the Cossacks came from one or more nomadic peoples who at different times lived in the territory of the Northern Black Sea. According to this hypothesis the Cossacks' ancestors were the Scythians, Sarmatians, Khazars, Polovtsy (Cumans), Circassians (Adygs), Tatars, and others. The nomadic hypothesis of the origin of the Cossacks was formed under the influence of the Polish historical school of the 16th–17th centuries and was connected with the theory of the Sarmatian origin of the gentry. According to the tradition of deriving the origin of the state or people from a certain people of antiquity, the Cossack chroniclers of the 18th century advocated the Khazar origin of the Cossacks. In the 20th century, the Russian scientist Gumilyov was an apologist for the Polovtsian origin of the Cossacks.

== Within the Polish–Lithuanian Commonwealth ==
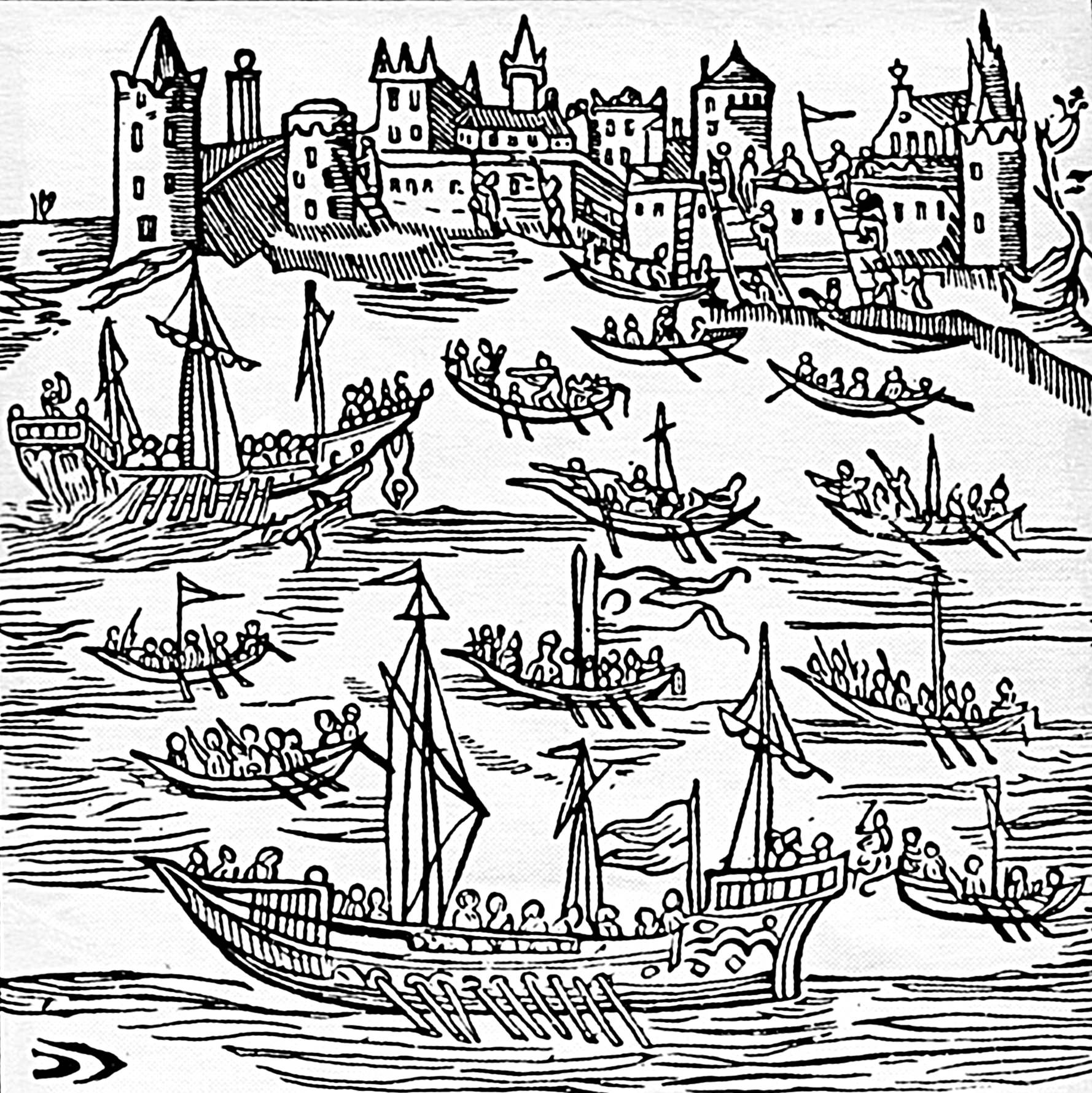
Thousands of slaves were freed in 1616 when the Petro Sahaidachny's Cossacks captured the town of Kaffa in Crimea

In the 16th century, with the dominance of the Polish–Lithuanian Commonwealth extending south, the Zaporozhian Cossacks were mostly, if tentatively, regarded by the Polish–Lithuanian Commonwealth as their subjects. Registered Cossacks were a part of the Commonwealth army until 1699.

Around the end of the 16th century, relations between the Polish–Lithuanian Commonwealth and the Ottoman Empire, which were not cordial to begin with, were further strained by increasing Cossack aggression. From the second part of the 16th century, the Cossacks started raiding Ottoman territories. The Polish government could not control the fiercely independent Cossacks but, since they were nominally subjects of the Commonwealth, it was held responsible for raids by their victims. Reciprocally, the Tatars living under the Ottoman rule launched raids in the Commonwealth, mostly in the sparsely inhabited south-east territories of Ukraine. Cossacks, however, were raiding wealthy merchant port cities in the heart of the Ottoman Empire, which were just two days away by boat from the mouth of the Dnieper River.

Consecutive treaties between the Ottoman Empire and the Polish–Lithuanian Commonwealth called for both parties to keep the Cossacks and Tatars in check, but enforcement was almost non-existent on both sides. In internal agreements, forced by the Poles, the Cossacks agreed to burn their boats and stop raiding. However, boats could be rebuilt quickly, and the Cossack lifestyle glorified raids and looting.

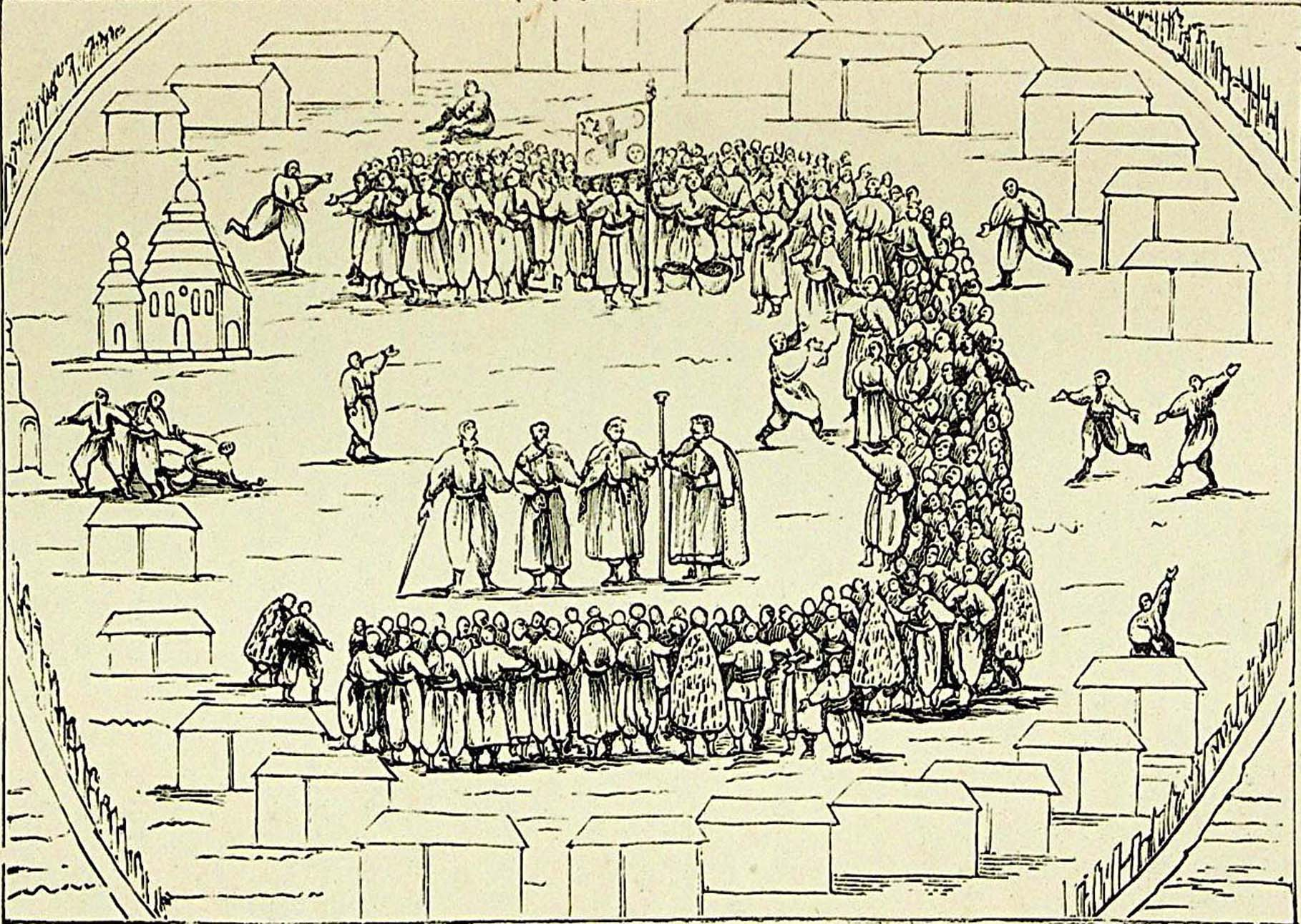
A Zaporozhian Sich Rada (Council)

During this time, the Habsburg monarchy sometimes covertly employed Cossack raiders to ease Ottoman pressure on their own borders. Many Cossacks and Tatars shared an animosity towards each other due to the damage done by raids from both sides. Cossack raids followed by Tatar retaliation, or Tatar raids followed by Cossack retaliation, were an almost regular occurrence. The ensuing chaos and string of conflicts often turned the entire south-eastern Polish–Lithuanian Commonwealth border into a low-intensity war zone and led to an escalation of Commonwealth–Ottoman warfare, from the Moldavian Magnate Wars to the Battle of Cecora (1620) and wars in 1633–34.

Cossack numbers expanded, with Ukrainian peasants running from serfdom in the Polish–Lithuanian Commonwealth. Attempts by the szlachta to turn the Zaporozhian Cossacks into serfs eroded the Cossacks' once fairly strong loyalty towards the Commonwealth. Cossack ambitions to be recognized as equal to the szlachta were constantly rebuffed, and plans for transforming the Polish–Lithuanian Two-Nations Commonwealth into a Polish–Lithuanian–Ruthenian Commonwealth (with the Ukrainian Cossack people) made little progress, owing to the Cossacks' unpopularity. The Cossacks' strong historic allegiance to the Eastern Orthodox Church put them at odds with the Catholic-dominated Commonwealth. Tensions increased when Commonwealth policies turned from relative tolerance to the suppression of the Orthodox church, making the Cossacks strongly anti-Catholic, which at that time was synonymous with anti-Polish.

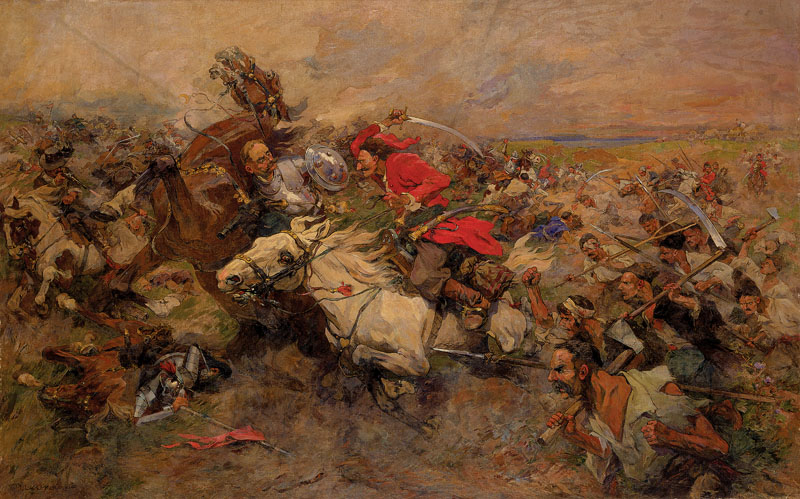
Battle between Maksym Kryvonis and Jarema Wisniowiecki during the Khmelnytsky Uprising, by Nikolay Samokish

The waning loyalty of the Cossacks and the szlachta's arrogance towards them resulted in several Cossack uprisings against the Polish–Lithuanian Commonwealth in the early 17th century. Finally, the King's adamant refusal to bow to the Cossacks' demand to expand the Cossack Registry was the last straw that prompted the largest and most successful of these: the Khmelnytsky Uprising, which started in 1648. The uprising became one of a series of catastrophic events known as the Deluge, which greatly weakened the Polish–Lithuanian Commonwealth and set the stage for its disintegration one hundred years later. Even though Poland probably had the best cavalry in Europe, their infantry was weak. Since Poland recruited most of its infantry from Ukraine, once this became free from Polish rule, the army of the Commonwealth suffered greatly.

The Koliivshchyna was a major haydamak rebellion that broke out in right-bank Ukraine in June 1768. It was caused by the dissatisfaction of peasants and Cossacks with the treatment of Orthodox Christians by the Bar Confederation. Zaporozhian Cossack Maksym Zalizniak was one of the leaders of the rebellion.

== Organization ==
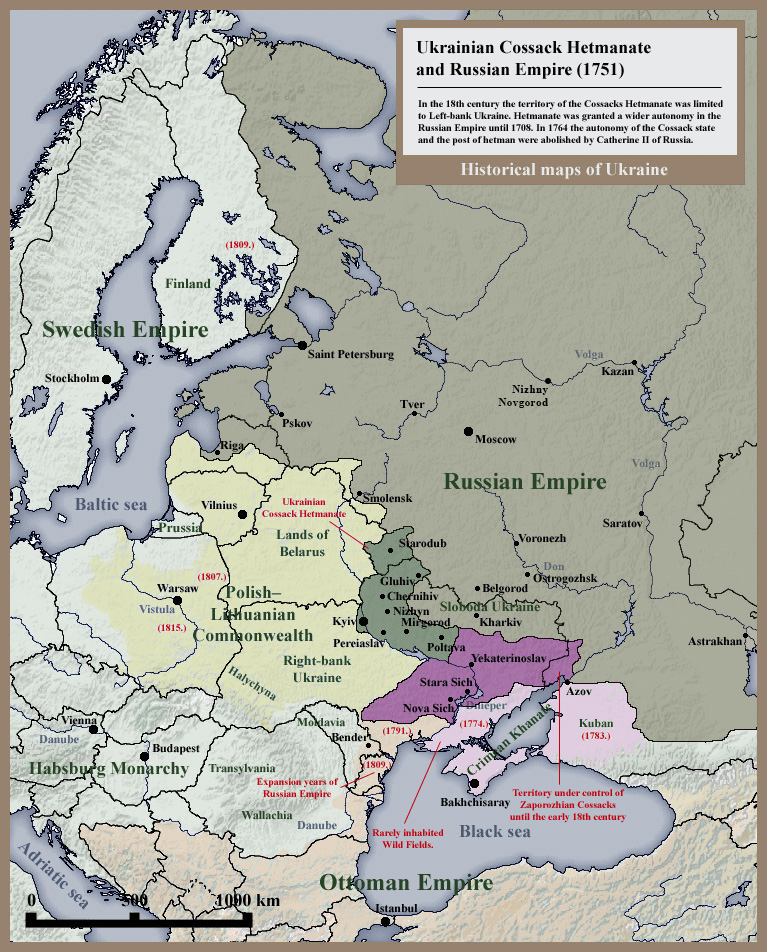
Historical map of Ukrainian Cossack Hetmanate and territory of Zaporozhian Cossacks under the rule of the Russian Empire (1751).

The Zaporozhian Host as a military-political establishment developed based upon unique traditions and customs called the Cossack Code, which was formed mostly among the cossacks of Zaporozhian Host over decades. The host had its own military and territorially administrative division: 38 kurins (sotnia) and five to eight palankas (territorial districts) as well as an original system of administration with three levels: military leaders, military officials, leaders of march and palankas. All officership (military starshyna) was elected by the General Military Council for a year on 1 January. Based on the same customs and traditions the rights and duties of officers were explicitly codified. The Zaporozhian Host developed an original judicial system, at the base of which lay the customary Cossack Code. The norms of the code were affirmed by those social relations that have developed among cossacks. Some sources refer to the Zaporozhian Sich as a "cossack republic", as the highest power in it belonged to the assembly of all its members, and because its leaders (starshina) were elected.

Officially the leader of Zaporozhian Host never carried the title of hetman, while all leaders of Cossack formations were unofficially referred to as one. The highest body of administration in the Zaporozhian Host was the Sich Rada (council). The council was the highest legislative, administrative, and judicial body of the Zaporozhian Host. Decisions of the council were considered the opinion of the whole host and obligated to its execution each member of the cossack comradeship. At the Sich Rada were reviewed issues of internal and foreign policies, conducted elections of the military starshyna, the division of assigned land, the punishment of criminals who committed the worst crimes etc.

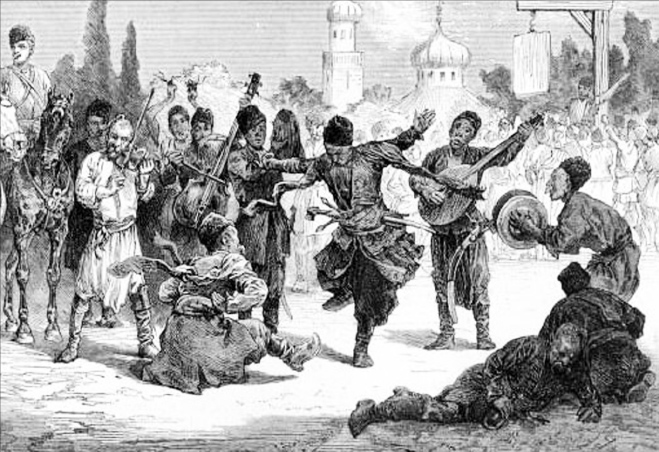
Zaporozhians in 1740

The Zaporozhian Host, while being closely associated with the Cossack Hetmanate, had its own administration and orders. For military operations, Cossacks of the Host organized into a kish (Ukrainian: кіш). Kish is an old term for a reinforced camp that was used in the 11th–16th centuries, and later adopted by the Cossacks. The kish was the central body of government in a Sich under jurisdiction of which were administrative, military, financial, legal, and other affairs. The kish was elected on annual bases at the Sich Rada (Black Rada). Black Rada was a council of all Cossacks. Kish elections took place either on 1 January, 1 October (Intercession of the Theotokos holiday – Pokrova), or on the 2nd–3rd day of Easter.

There was a Cossack military court, which severely punished violence and stealing among compatriots, bringing women to the Sich, consumption of alcohol in periods of conflict, etc. There were also churches and schools, providing religious services and basic education. Principally, the Eastern Orthodox Church was preferred and was a part of the national identity.

In times of peace, Cossacks were engaged in their occupations, living with their families, studying strategy, languages and educating recruits. As opposed to other armies, Cossacks were free to choose their preferred weapon. Wealthy Cossacks preferred to wear heavy armour, while infantrymen preferred to wear simple clothes, although they also occasionally wore mail.

At that time, the Cossacks were one of the finest military organizations in Europe, and were employed by Russian, Polish, and French empires.

=== Kurins of the Zaporozhian Host ===
- Levushkovsky
- Plastunovsky
- Dyadkovsky
- Bryukhovetsky
- Vedmedovsky
- Platmyrovsky
- Pashkovsky
- Kushchevsky
- Kyslyakovsky
- Ivanovsky
- Konelovsky
- Serhiyevsky
- Donsky
- Krylovsky
- Kanivsky
- Baturynsky
- Popovychevsky
- Vasyurynsky
- Nezamaikovsky
- Irkliyevsky
- Shcherbynovsky
- Tytarovsky
- Shkurynsky
- Kurenevsky
- Rohovsky
- Korsunsky
- Kalnybolotsky
- Humansky
- Derevyantsovsky
- Stebliyivsky-Higher
- Stebliyivsky-Lower
- Zherelovsky
- Pereyaslavsky
- Poltavsky
- Myshastovsky
- Minsky
- Tymoshevsky
- Velychkovsky

Beside the above-mentioned kurins there also was a great number of other kurins outside the Host.

=== Cossack Regalia (Kleinody) ===
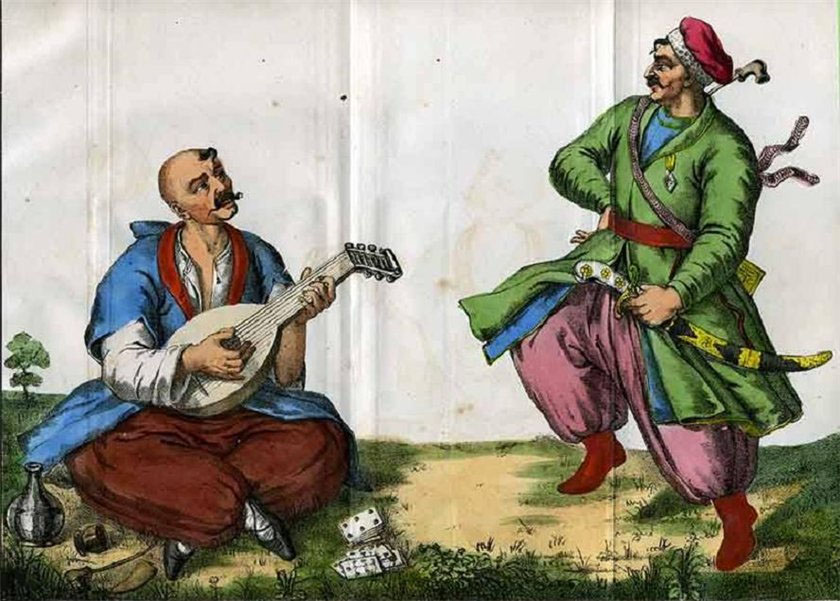
Zaporozhian cossack with bandura

The most important items of the host were the Cossack Kleinody (always in plural; related to Imperial Regalia) that consisted of valuable military distinctions, regalia, and attributes of the Ukrainian Cossacks and were used until the 19th century. Kleinody were awarded to Zaporozhian Cossacks by the Polish king Stephen Báthory on 20 August 1576 to Bohdan Ruzhynsky, among which were khoruhva, bunchuk, bulawa "mace" and a seal with a coat of arms on which was depicted a cossack with a samopal "rifle". The kleinody were assigned to hetman's assistants for safekeeping, thus there have appeared such ranks as chorąży ("flag-bearer"), bunchuzhny ("staff-keeper"), etc. Later part of Cossack kleinody became pernaches, timpani (lytavry), kurin banners (badges), batons, and others.

The highest symbol of power was the bulawa or mace carried by hetmans and kish otamans. For example, Bohdan Khmelnytsky already from 1648 carried a silver gold-covered bulawa decorated with pearls and other valuable gem stones. The cossack colonels had pernachs (shestopers) – smaller ribbed bulawas which were carried behind a belt.

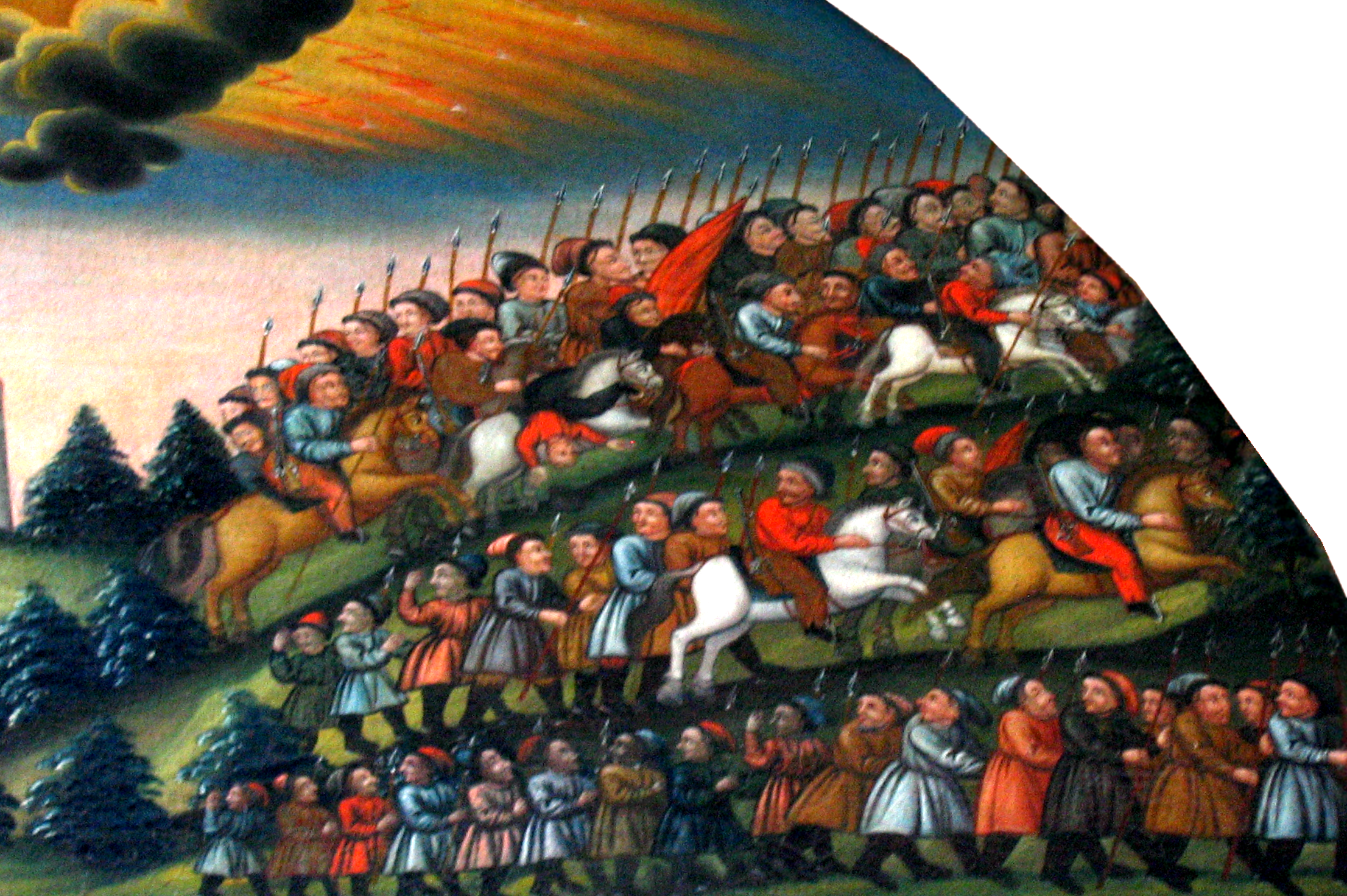
Cossack army near Lublin in 1648.

The seal of the Zaporozhian Host was produced in a round form out of silver with a depiction of a Cossack in a gabled cap on a head, in kaftan with buttons on a chest, with a sabre (shablya), powder flask on a side, and a self-made rifle (samopal) on the left shoulder. Around the seal was an inscription «Печать славного Війська Запорізького Низового» ("Seal of the glorious Zaporozhian Host"). Palanka's and kurin's seals were either round or rectangular with images of lions, deer, horses, moon, stars, crowns, lances, sabers, and bows.

Khoruhva was mostly of a crimson color embroidered with coats of arms, saints, crosses, and others. It was always carried in front of the army next to the hetman or otaman. A badge (znachok) was a name for a kurin's or company's (sotnia) banners. There was a tradition when the newly elected colonel was required at his own expense prepare palanka's banner. One of the banners was preserved until 1845 in Kuban and was made out of tissue in two colors: yellow and blue. Kettledrums (lytavry) were large copper boilers that were fitted with a leather which served for transmission of various signals (calling cossacks to a council, raising an alarm etc.).

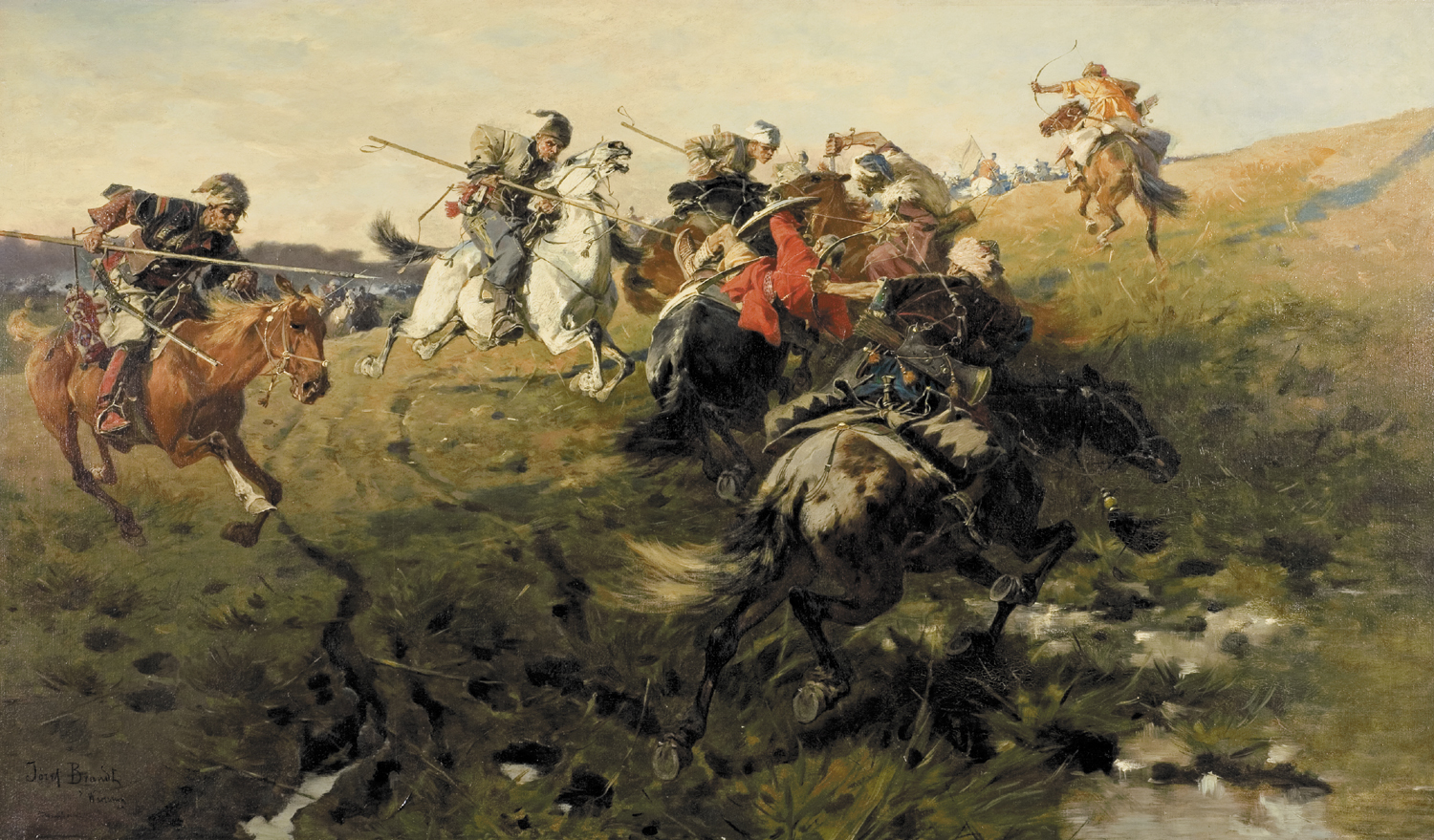
Zaporozhian cossacks fighting Tatars from the Crimean Khanate, by Józef Brandt.

Each item of kleinody was granted to a clearly assigned member of cossack starshina (officership). For example, in the Zaporozhian Host, the bulawa was given to the otaman; the khoruhva – to the whole host although carried by a khorunzhy; the bunchuk also was given to otaman, but carried by a bunchuzhny or bunchuk comrade; the seal was preserved by a military judge, while the seals of the kurin – to the kurin otaman, and the seals of the palanka – to the colonel of a certain palanka; the kettledrums were in possession of a dovbysh (drummer); the staffs – to a military osavul; the badges were given to all the 38 kurins in possession to the assigned badge comrades. All kleinody items (except for the kettledrum sticks) were stored in the Sich's Pokrova church treasury and were taken out only on a special order of the kish otaman. The kettledrum sticks were kept in the kurin with the assigned dovbysh. Sometimes, part of kleidony was considered a great silver inkwell (kalamar), an attribute of a military scribe (pysar) of the Zaporozhian Host. Similar kleinods had the officership of the Cossack Hetmanate, cossacks of Kuban, Danube, and other cossack societies.

Upon the destruction of the Sich and liquidation of Ukrainian Cossacks the kleinody were gathered and given away for storage in Hermitage and Transfiguration Cathedral in Saint Petersburg, Kremlin Armoury in Moscow as well as other places of storage. By the end of 19th century the Hermitage stored 17 kurin banners and one khoruhva, the Transfiguration Cathedral contained 20 kurin banners, three bunchuks, one silver bulawa, and one silver gold-covered baton. Today the fate of those national treasures of Ukrainian people is unknown. After the February Revolution in 1917 the Russian Provisional Government adopted the decisions of returning them to Ukraine, however, due to the events of the October Revolution of the same year the decision was not executed. With the proclamation of independence, the Ukrainian government has raised the issue of returning the national cultural valuables before the leadership of Russia; no specific agreements have ever been reached, however.

== Alliance with Russia ==
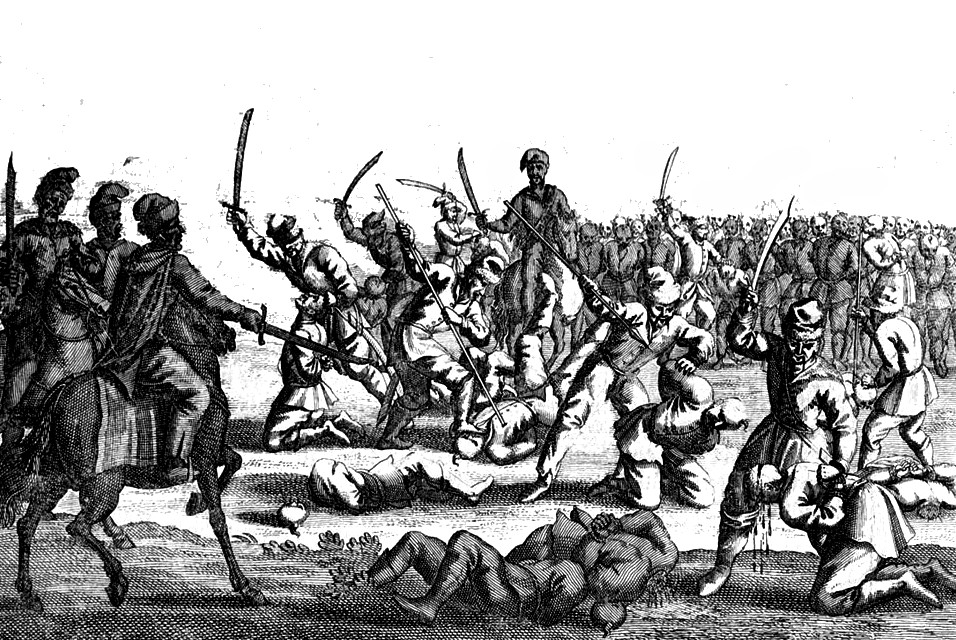
Massacre of Polish captives by Cossacks after the battle of Batoh 1652

After the Treaty of Pereyaslav in 1654, the Zaporozhian Host became a suzerainty under the protection of the tsar of Russia, although for a considerable period of time it enjoyed nearly complete autonomy. After the death of Bohdan Khmelnytsky in 1657, his successor Ivan Vyhovsky initiated a turn towards Poland, alarmed by the growing Russian interference in the affairs of the Hetmanate. An attempt was made to return to the three-constituent Commonwealth of nations with the Zaporozhian cossacks joining the Polish–Lithuanian Commonwealth by signing the Treaty of Hadiach (1658). The treaty was ratified by the Sejm but was rejected at the Hermanivka Rada by the Cossack rank and file, who would not accept a union with Catholic Poland, which they perceived as an oppressor of Orthodox Christianity. The angered cossacks executed Polkovniks Prokip Vereshchaka and Stepan Sulyma, Vyhovsky's associates at the Sejm, and Vyhovsky himself narrowly escaped death.

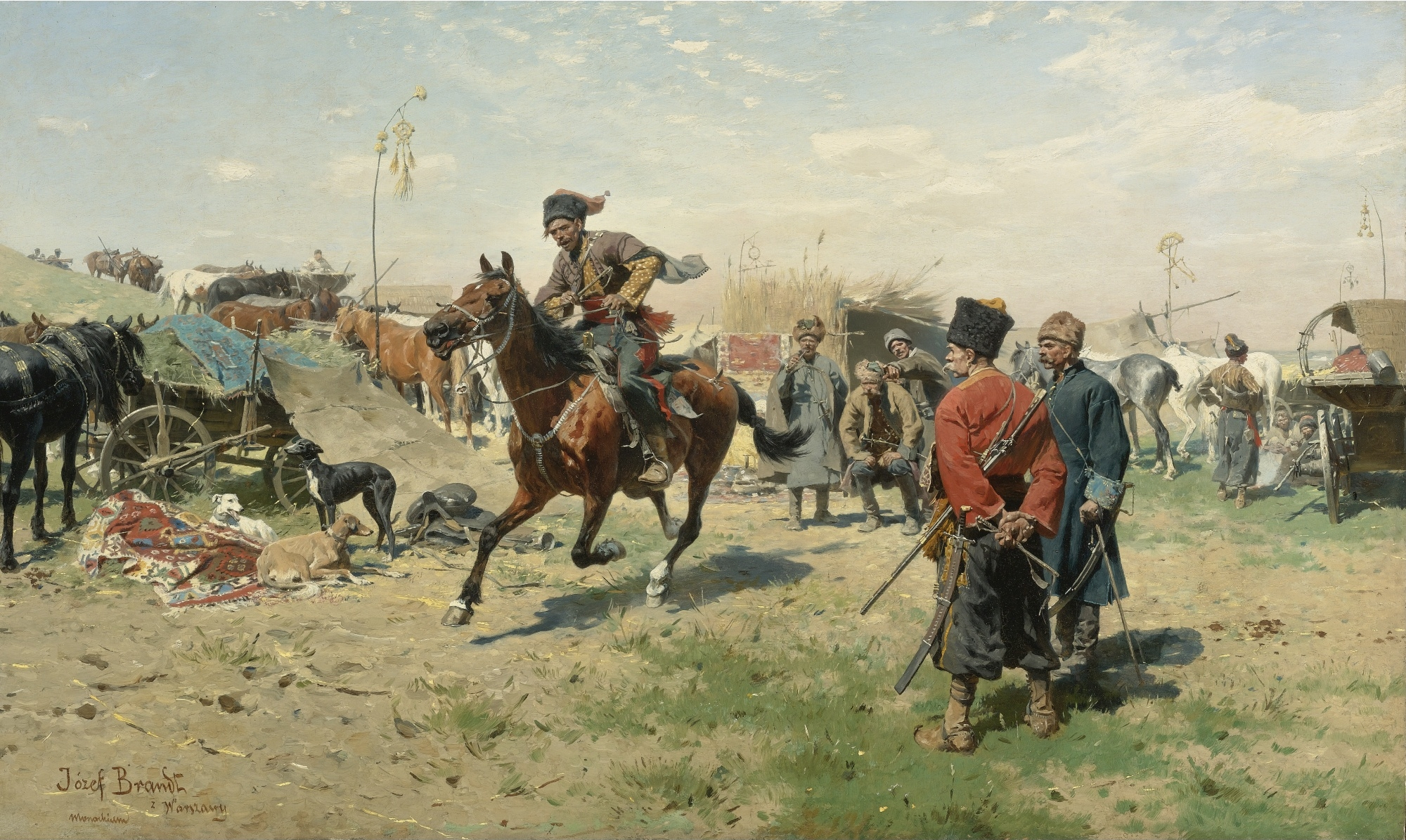
Zaporizhians by Józef Brandt

The Zaporozhians maintained a largely separate government from the Hetmanate. The Zaporozhians elected their own leaders, known as Kish otaman, for one-year terms. In this period, friction between the cossacks of the Hetmanate and the Zaporozhians escalated.

The Cossacks had fought in the past for independence from the Polish–Lithuanian Commonwealth, and they were later involved in several uprisings against the tsar, in fear of losing their privileges and autonomy. In 1709, for example, the Zaporozhian Host led by Kost Hordiienko joined Hetman Ivan Mazepa against Russia. Mazepa was previously a trusted adviser and close friend to Tsar Peter the Great but allied himself with Charles XII of Sweden against Peter I. After the defeat at the Battle of Poltava Peter ordered a retaliatory destruction of the Sich.

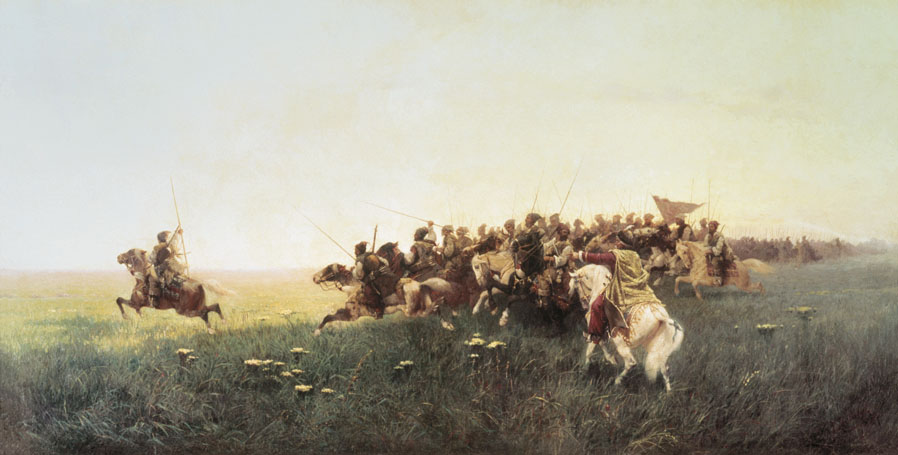
Zaporozhian's Attack in steppes, by Franz Roubaud

With the death of Mazepa in Bessarabia in 1709, his council elected his former general chancellor, Pylyp Orlyk, as his successor. Orlyk issued the project of the Constitution, where he promised to limit the authority of the Hetman, preserve the privileged position of the Zaporozhians, take measures towards achieving social equality among them, and steps towards the separation of the Zaporizhian Host from the Russian State—should he manage to obtain power in the Cossack Hetmanate. With the support of Charles XII, Orlyk made an alliance with the Crimean Tatars and Ottomans against Russia, but following the early successes of their 1711 attack on Russia, their campaign was defeated, and Orlyk returned into exile. The Zaporozhians built a new Sich under Crimean-Ottoman protection, the Oleshky Sich on the lower Dnieper.

Although some of the Zaporozhian cossacks returned to Moscow's protection, their popular leader Kost Hordiienko was resolute in his anti-Russian attitude and no rapprochement was possible until his death in 1733.

== Within the Russian Empire ==
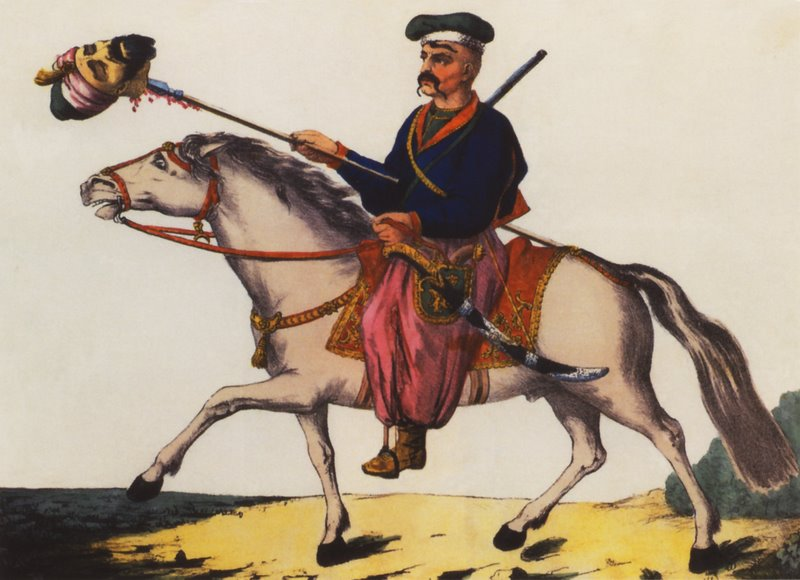
"Cossack with a head of a Tatar."

Over the years the friction between the Cossacks and the Russian tsarist government lessened, and privileges were traded for a reduction in Cossack autonomy. The Ukrainian Cossacks who did not side with Mazepa elected as Hetman Ivan Skoropadsky, one of the "anti-Mazepist" polkovniks. While advocating for the preservation for the Hetmanate autonomy and privileges of the starshina, Skoropadsky was careful to avoid open confrontation and remained loyal to the union with Russia. To accommodate Russian military needs, Skoropadsky allowed for stationing of ten Russian regiments in the territory of the Hetmanate. At the same time, Cossacks took part in construction, fortification and channel development projects in Saint Petersburg, as part of the effort by Peter the Great to establish the new Russian capital. Many did not return, and it is often stated that St. Peterburg "was built on bones".

In 1734, as Russia was preparing for a new war against the Ottoman Empire, an agreement was made between Russia and the Zaporozhian cossacks, the Treaty of Lubny. The Zaporozhian Cossacks regained all of their former lands, privileges, laws and customs in exchange for serving under the command of a Russian Army stationed in Kiev. A new sich (Nova Sich) was built to replace the one that had been destroyed by Peter the Great. According to the 1756 Zaporozhian Sich register, only about 30,000 people, 12,758 of whom were Cossack, lived across the Zaporozhian Cossack territories, a low figure due to frequent raids by Crimean Tatars. Concerned about the possibility of Russian interference in Zaporozhia's internal affairs, the Cossacks began to settle their lands with Ukrainian peasants fleeing serfdom in Poland and Russia proper. By 1762, 33,700 Cossacks and over 150,000 peasants populated Zaporozhia.

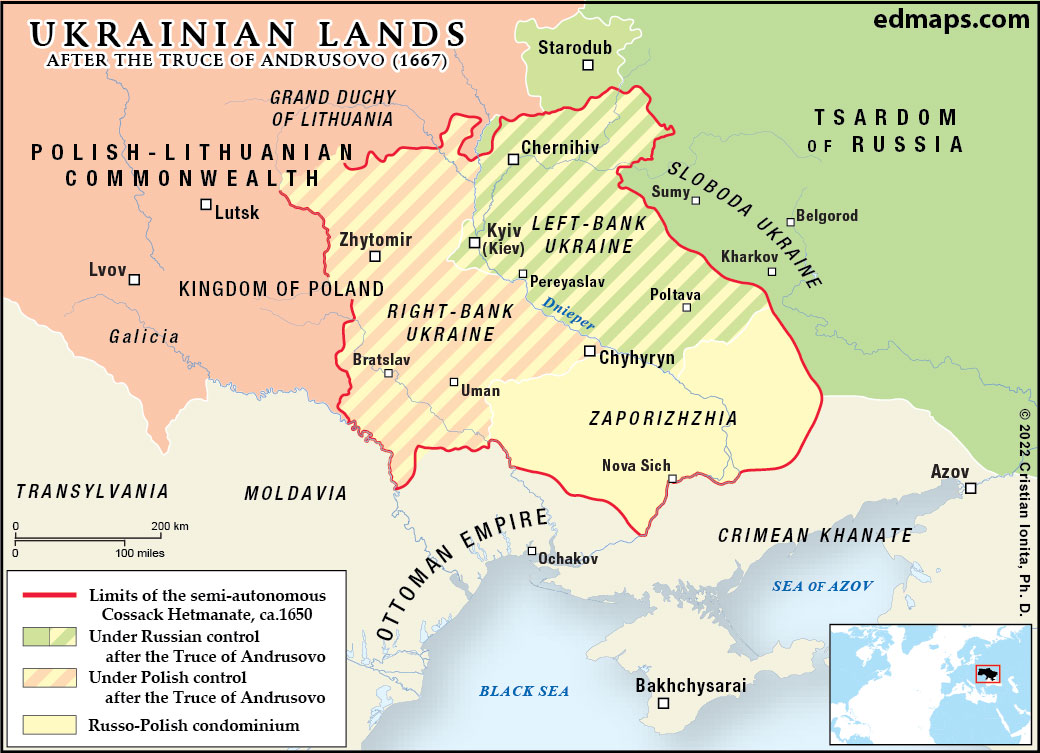
Partition of Cossack Hetmanate after the Truce of Andrusovo (1667)

By the late 18th century, much of the Cossack officer class in Ukraine was incorporated into the Russian nobility, but many of the rank and file Cossacks, including a substantial portion of the old Zaporozhians, were reduced to peasant status. They were able to maintain their freedom and continued to provide refuge for those fleeing serfdom in Russia and Poland, including followers of the Russian Cossack Yemelyan Pugachev, which aroused the anger of Russian Empress Catherine II. As a result, by 1775 the number of runaway serfs from the Hetmanate and Polish-ruled Ukraine to Zaporizhiya rose to 100,000.

The Treaty of Küçük Kaynarca (1774) annexed the Crimean Khanate into Russia, so the need for further southern frontier defence (which the Zaporozhians carried out) no longer existed. Colonisation of Novorossiya began; one of the colonies, located just next to the lands of the Zaporozhian Sich, was New Serbia. This escalated conflicts over land ownership with the Cossacks, which often turned violent.== Within the Russian Empire ==

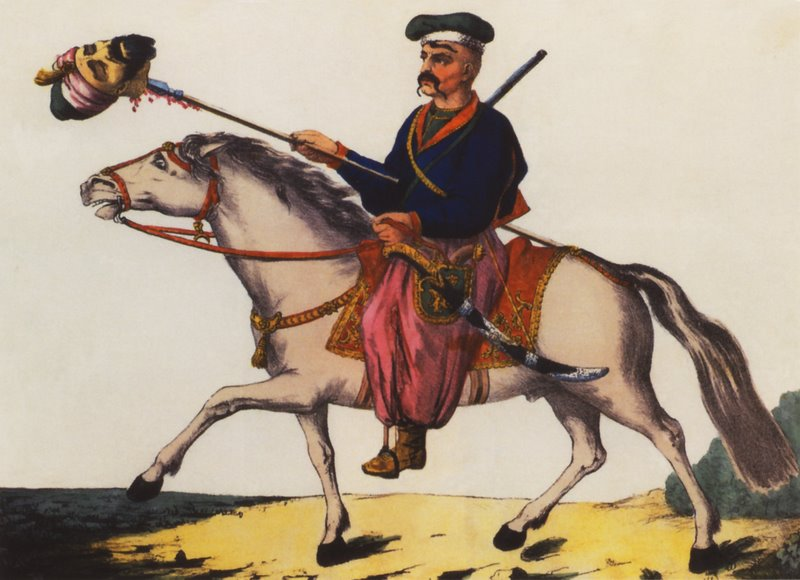
"Cossack with a head of a Tatar."

Over the years the friction between the Cossacks and the Russian tsarist government lessened, and privileges were traded for a reduction in Cossack autonomy. The Ukrainian Cossacks who did not side with Mazepa elected as Hetman Ivan Skoropadsky, one of the "anti-Mazepist" polkovniks. While advocating for the preservation for the Hetmanate autonomy and privileges of the starshina, Skoropadsky was careful to avoid open confrontation and remained loyal to the union with Russia. To accommodate Russian military needs, Skoropadsky allowed for stationing of ten Russian regiments in the territory of the Hetmanate. At the same time, Cossacks took part in construction, fortification and channel development projects in Saint Petersburg, as part of the effort by Peter the Great to establish the new Russian capital. Many did not return, and it is often stated that St. Peterburg "was built on bones".

In 1734, as Russia was preparing for a new war against the Ottoman Empire, an agreement was made between Russia and the Zaporozhian cossacks, the Treaty of Lubny. The Zaporozhian Cossacks regained all of their former lands, privileges, laws and customs in exchange for serving under the command of a Russian Army stationed in Kiev. A new sich (Nova Sich) was built to replace the one that had been destroyed by Peter the Great.

Concerned about the possibility of Russian interference in Zaporozhia's internal affairs, the Cossacks began to settle their lands with Ukrainian peasants fleeing serfdom in Poland and Russia proper. By 1762, 33,700 Cossacks and over 150,000 peasants populated Zaporozhia.

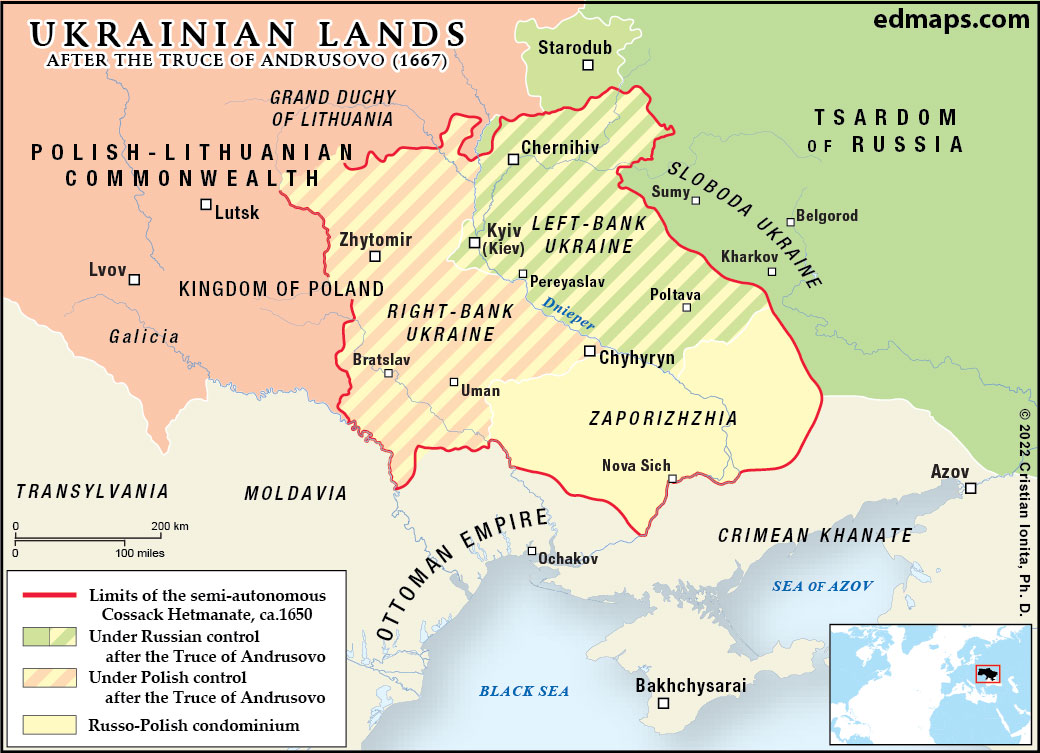
Partition of Cossack Hetmanate after the Truce of Andrusovo (1667)

By the late 18th century, much of the Cossack officer class in Ukraine was incorporated into the Russian nobility, but many of the rank and file Cossacks, including a substantial portion of the old Zaporozhians, were reduced to peasant status. They were able to maintain their freedom and continued to provide refuge for those fleeing serfdom in Russia and Poland, including followers of the Russian Cossack Yemelyan Pugachev, which aroused the anger of Russian Empress Catherine II. As a result, by 1775 the number of runaway serfs from the Hetmanate and Polish-ruled Ukraine to Zaporizhiya rose to 100,000.

The Treaty of Küçük Kaynarca (1774) annexed the Crimean Khanate into Russia, so the need for further southern frontier defence (which the Zaporozhians carried out) no longer existed. Colonisation of Novorossiya began; one of the colonies, located just next to the lands of the Zaporozhian Sich, was New Serbia. This escalated conflicts over land ownership with the Cossacks, which often turned violent.

== The end of the Zaporozhian Host (1775) ==
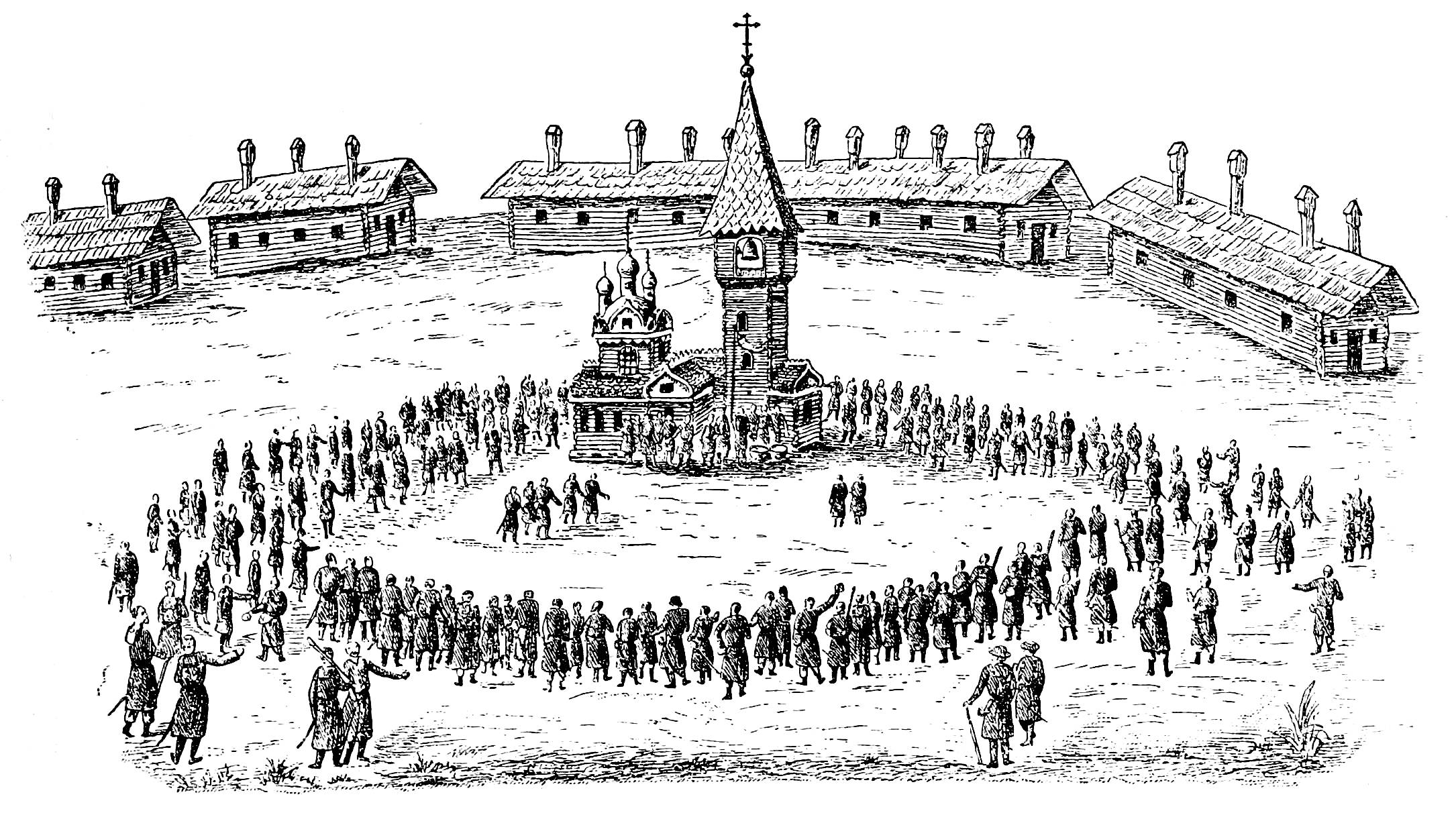
A Zaporozhian Sich Rada in 1773

The decision to disband the Sich was adopted at the court council of Catherine the Great on 7 May 1775. General Peter Tekeli received orders to occupy and liquidate the main Zaporozhian fortress, the Sich. The plan was kept secret and regiments returning from the Russo-Turkish war, in which Cossacks also participated, were mobilized for the operation. They included 31 regiments (65,000 men in total). The attack took place on 15 May and continued until 8 June. The order was given by Grigory Potemkin, who had formally become an honorary Zaporozhian Cossack under the name of Hrytsko Nechesa a few years prior. Potemkin was given a direct order from Empress Catherine II, which she explained in her Decree of 8 August 1775:

With this we would like to let our Empire and our faithful subjects be known that the Zaporozhian Sich is now destroyed and the name of Zaporozhian Cossacks is to be no more as well, mentioning of whom will be considered no less as an affront to our Imperial Majesty for their deeds and insolence for disobeying the will of our Imperial Majesty.

On 5 June 1775 General Tekeli's forces divided into five detachments and surrounded the Sich with artillery and infantry. The lack of southern borders and enemies in the past years had a profound effect on the combat-ability of the Cossacks, who realised the Russian infantry would destroy them after they were surrounded. To trick the Cossacks, a rumour was spread that the army was crossing Cossack lands en route to guard the borders. The surprise encirclement was a devastating blow to the morale of the Cossacks.

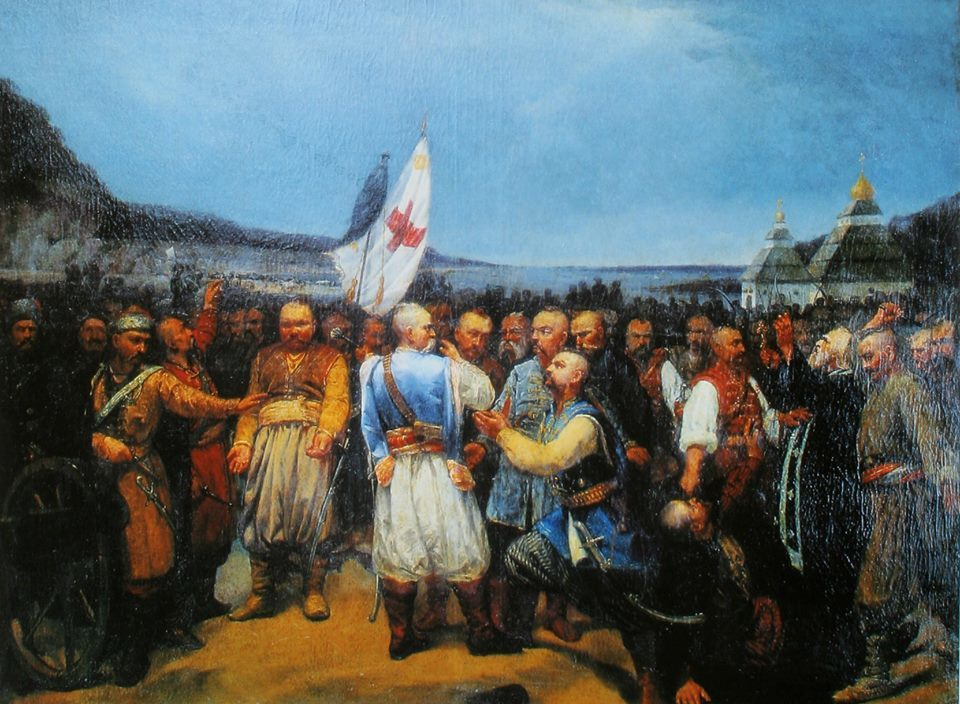
Last Rada on Sich, by Viktor Kovalyov

Petro Kalnyshevsky was given two hours to decide on the Empress's ultimatum. Under the guidance of a starshyna Lyakh, behind Kalnyshevky's back a conspiracy was formed with a group of 50 Cossacks to go fishing in the river Inhul next to the Southern Bug in Ottoman provinces. The pretext was enough to allow the Russians to let the Cossacks out of the siege, who were joined by five thousand others. The fleeing Cossacks traveled to the Danube Delta, where they formed the new Danubian Sich, under the protectorate of the Ottoman Empire.

When Tekeli became aware of the escape, there was little left to do for the remaining 12,000 Cossacks. The Sich was razed to the ground. The Cossacks were disarmed in a mostly bloodless operation, while their treasury and archives were confiscated. Kalnyshevsky was arrested and exiled to the Solovki, where he lived in confinement to 112 years of age. Most upper level Cossack Council members, such as Pavlo Holovaty and Ivan Hloba, were repressed and exiled as well, although lower level commanders and rank and file Cossacks were allowed to join the Russian hussar and dragoon regiments.

== Aftermath ==
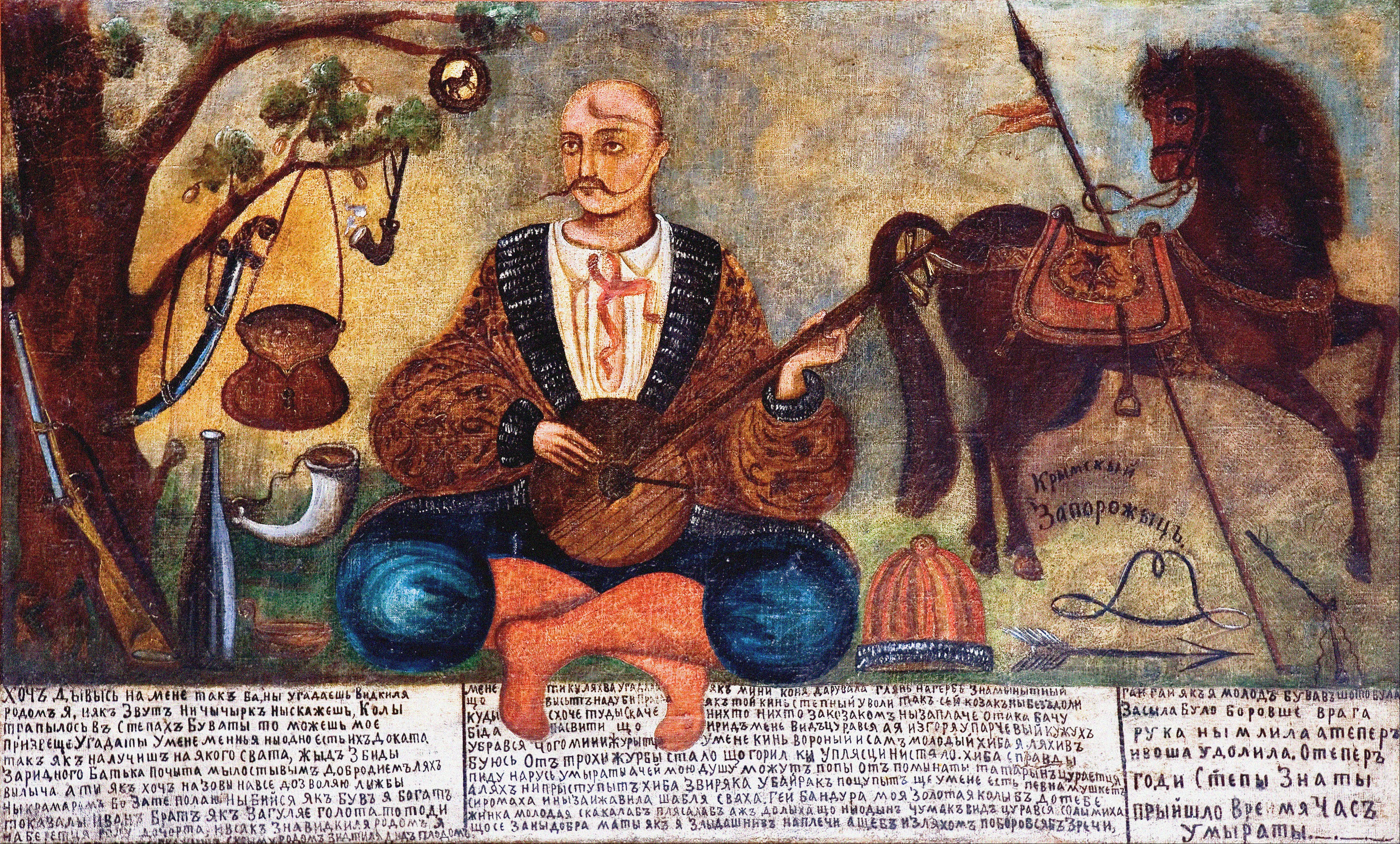
Zaporozhian Cossack from Crimea

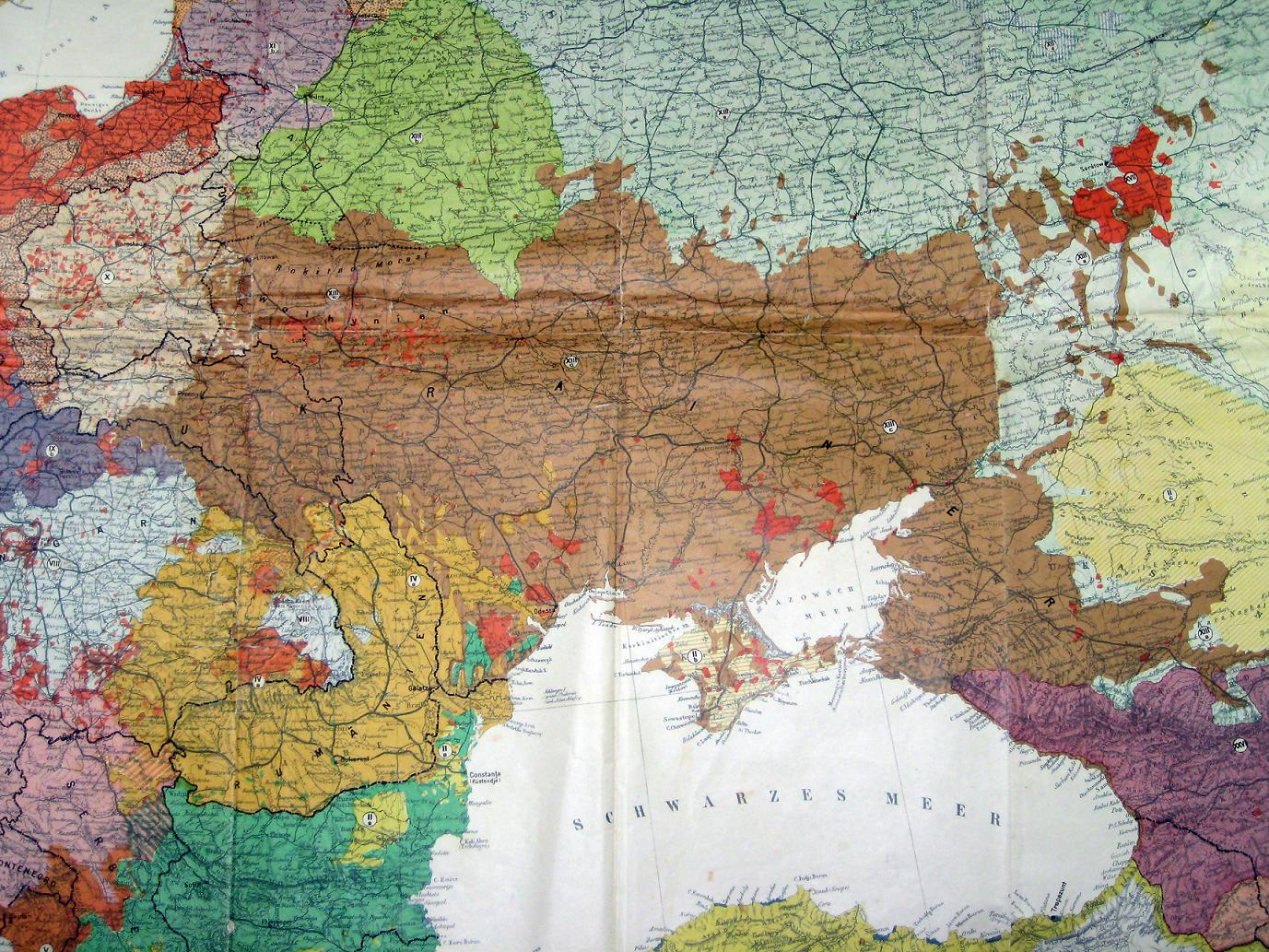
Historical approximate map of ethnic Ukrainians, c. 1918

The destruction of the Sich created difficulties for the Russian Empire. Supporting the increase in the privileges gained by the higher ranking leadership put a strain in the budget, whilst the stricter regulations of the regular Russian Army prevented many other Cossacks from integrating. The existence of the Danubian Sich, which would support the Ottoman Empire in the next war, was also troublesome for the Russians. In 1784 Potemkin formed the Host of the Loyal Zaporozhians (Войско верных Запорожцев) and settled them between the Southern Bug and Dniester rivers. For their invaluable service during the Russo-Turkish War (1787–1792), they were rewarded with the Kuban land and migrated there in 1792.

In 1828, the Danubian Sich ceased to exist after it was pardoned by Emperor Nicholas I, and under amnesty its members settled on the shores of the Northern Azov between Berdyansk and Mariupol, forming the Azov Cossack Host. Finally in 1862 they too migrated to the Kuban and merged with the Kuban Cossacks. The Kuban Cossacks served Russia's interests right up to the October Revolution, and their descendants are now undergoing active regeneration both culturally and militarily. The 30,000 descendants of those Cossacks who refused to return to Russia in 1828 still live in the Danube delta region of Ukraine and Romania, where they pursue the traditional Cossack lifestyle of hunting and fishing and are known as Rusnaks.

== Legacy ==
Although in 1775 the Zaporozhian Host formally ceased to exist, it left a profound cultural, political and military legacy on Ukraine, Russia, Poland, Turkey and other states that came in contact with it. The shifting alliances of the Cossacks have generated controversy, especially during the 20th century. For Russians, the Treaty of Pereyaslav gave the Tsardom of Russia and later Russian Empire the impulse to take over the Ruthenian lands, claim rights as the sole successor of the Kievan Rus', and for the Russian Tsar to be declared the protector of all Russias, culminating in the Pan-Slavism movement of the 19th century.

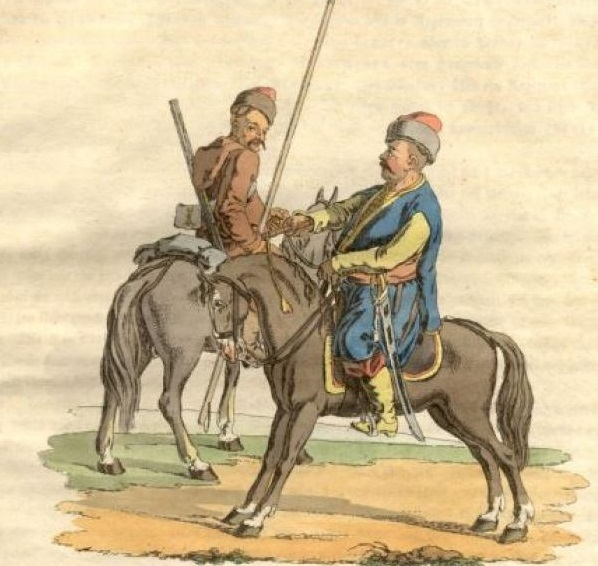
Black Sea Cossacks, c. 1807

Today, most of the Kuban Cossacks, modern descendants of the Zaporozhians, remain loyal towards Russia. Many fought in the local conflicts following the dissolution of the Soviet Union and today, just like before the revolution when they made up the private guard of the Emperor, the majority of the Kremlin Presidential Regiment is made up of Kuban Cossacks.

For the Polish–Lithuanian Commonwealth, the Khmelnytsky Uprising and the fall of the Zaporozhian Cossacks effectively marked the beginning of its end with the Deluge, which led to the gradual demise of the Commonwealth ending with the Partitions of Poland in the late 18th century. A similar fate awaited both the Crimean Khanate and the Ottoman Empire; having endured numerous raids and attacks from them both, the Zaporozhian Cossacks aided the Russian Army in ending Turkey's ambitions of expanding into northern and Central Europe, and like Poland, after the loss of Crimea, the Ottoman Empire began to decline.

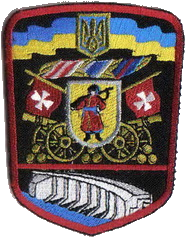
Shoulder sleeve insignia of the Ukrainian Army's 55th Artillery Brigade "Zaporozhian Sich"

The historical legacy of the Zaporozhian Cossacks shaped and influenced the idea of Ukrainian nationalism in the latter half of the 19th century. Ukrainian historians, such as Adrian Kashchenko (1858–1921), Olena Apanovich and others suggest that the final abolishment of the Zaporozhian Sich in 1775 was the demise of a historic Ukrainian stronghold. After the Revolution of 1917, corps of Free Cossacks were organized in Ukraine to defend the newly proclaimed Ukrainian People's Republic. During the Soviet era, the nationalist aspect was officially discouraged in order to quell the rise of nationalist sentiment and Zaporozhian Cossacks' historical role of defending Muscovy from Turks was celebrated instead. In 1990, the Soviet government and Ukrainian independence movement cooperated to celebrate the 500th anniversary of the Zaporozhian Sich.

Zaporozhian attire, songs, and music found their way into official state dance and music ensembles, and influenced the image of Ukraine in the years to come. Since the Independence of Ukraine in 1991, attempts at restoring the Cossack lifestyle have concentrated on politics, horsemanship and cultural endeavours. In November, 2016, Cossack songs of Dnipropetrovsk Oblast were inscribed on the UNESCO List of Intangible Cultural Heritage in Need of Urgent Safeguarding.

Currently the Zaporozhian Cossack stronghold Khortytsia is perceived to be a symbol of Ukrainian statehood.

== See also ==
- Cossack host
- Crimean Khanate
- Dmytro Yavornytsky, early scholar of the Zaporizhian Cossacks
- Hetman of Zaporizhian Cossacks
- The History of the Zaporizhian Cossacks (1740s), historical work written by Semen Ivanovych Myshetsky
- Khmelnytsky Uprising
- Kuban Cossacks
- Mezhyhirya Monastery
- Mongol and Tatar states in Europe
- Correspondence between the Cossacks and the Ottoman sultan – apocryphal diplomatic exchange of letters
  - Reply of the Zaporozhian Cossacks – famous painting based on this apocryphal correspondence
- Sloboda Ukraine
- Taras Bulba
- Zaporozhian Sich
