= Nekrasov Cossacks =

Subgroup of Don Cossacks

Nekrasov Cossacks, Nekrasovite Cossacks, Nekrasovites, Nekrasovtsy (Russian: Некрасовцы, Некрасовские казаки, Казаки-некрасовцы) descend from those Don Cossacks who, after the defeat of the Bulavin Rebellion of 1707–1708, fled to the Kuban in September 1708, headed by Ignat Nekrasov, hence their name. At that time the Crimean Khanate ruled the Kuban. Later, other fugitives from the Don and runaway Russian serfs joined the Nekrasov Cossacks. The Nekrasovites were Old Believers, and hence persecuted by the Orthodox Russian authorities.

Initially, the Nekrasovites settled by the right bank of the Bolshaya Laba River, near its mouth. Later, the majority, including Nekrasov himself, settled on the Taman Peninsula, in three townlets (gorodoks): Bludilovsky, Golubinsky and Chiryansky.

The Nekrasovites continued to raid the adjacent Russian lands, including the Don area; Russian forces carried out counter-raids. As a consequence, until 1737, several hundreds of thousands of fugitives from Southern Russia fled to the Kuban, with a significant number joining the Nekrasovites.

About 1737 the activity of the Nekrasovites petered out: historians assume that Nekrasov died in that year. Soon afterwards the Nekrasovite community began to disintegrate and resettled in the Ottoman Empire.

During the Second World War, a number of Nekrasov Cossacks participated in the war on the side of the German military. In 1962 some Nekrasov Cossacks migrated to the Soviet Union. They have preserved the Don Cossack language, songs, and their ethnic identity despite their separation from other Cossacks for more than 200 years. There is an ongoing work for preserving the heritage of Nekrasov Cossacks.

== See also ==
- Cossacks in Turkey
