= Pilipchuk =

Pilipchuk is a Belarusian surname derived from the given name Pilip, i.e., Philip. Ukrainian spelling: Pylypchuk from Pylyp, Russian: Filipchuk from Filip.

- Konstantin Pilipchuk (born 1986), Russian acrobatic gymnast
- Sviatlana Tsikhanouskaya née Pilipchuk (born 1982), Belarusian opposition leader
