= Kosmichnyi District =

City district of Zaporizhzhia, Ukraine

Kosmichnyi District Космічний район
- Urban district
- Administrative map of Zaporizhzhia; the Kosmichnyi District is indicated by the number 3.

- Location of the urban district on a map of Zaporizhzhia Oblast.
- Coordinates: 47°46′37″N 35°11′21″E
- Country: Ukraine
- Municipality: Zaporizhzhia Municipality
- Established: 6 April 1977

Government
  - Chairman: Vasyl Yakovenko

Area
  - Total: 61 km^{2} (24 sq mi)

Population (2012)
  - Total: 134,465 ▼
  - Density: 2,200/km^{2} (5,700/sq mi)
- Time zone: UTC+2 (EET)
  - Summer (DST): UTC+3 (EEST)
- Postal index: 330104
- Area code: +380 61
- KOATUU: 2310136700
- Website: w1.c1.rada.gov.ua/pls/z7502/A005?rdat1=20.01.2015&rf7571=13148

The Kosmichnyi District (Ukrainian: Космічний район, romanized: Kosmichnyi raion) is one of seven administrative urban districts (raions) of the city of Zaporizhzhia, located in southern Ukraine. Its population was 139,222 in the 2001 Ukrainian Census, and 134,465 as of 2012.

The district contains the informal Pivdennyi (Southern) and Kosmichnyi (Space) residential neighborhoods within its boundaries.

== Name ==
The district was originally named Komunarskyi District, after the former Komunar factory (currently, the Zaporizhzhia Automobile Building Plant) which is located within the district's boundaries. Since 2023, the district was to be renamed to comply with the derussification legislation. In the survey organized by the city council in July 2025, 67.8% voted for the new name Kosmichnyi District. On 12 November 2025, the city council registered the draft decision on the district's renaming, and the final change occurred after a vote on 19 November 2025.

== Geography ==
The district is located in the southeastern portion of the city, on the left-bank of the Dnipro River, just north of the rural settlement of Balabyne, Zaporizhzhia Oblast. Its total area is 61 km^{2} (24 mi^{2}).

== History ==
On 6 April 1977, the Komunarskyi District was established out of a portion of the present-day Oleksandrivskyi District by a decree of the Presidium of the Verkhovna Rada of the Ukrainian Soviet Socialist Republic (No.1901-ІХ).
