= Filipchenko =

Filipchenko is a Ukrainian patronymic surname from a masculine given name Filip (Ukrainian: Пилип) (cognate to Philip), of the following people:

- Anatoly Filipchenko, Ukrainian Soviet cosmonaut
- Fyodor Filipchenko, Soviet military pilot
- Yuri Filipchenko, Russian entomologist who coined the terms microevolution and macroevolution

== See also ==
- Filipchuk
- Filipenko
