= Filippenko =

Filippenko is a Ukrainian patronymic surname derived from the given name Philip. Notable people with the surname include:

- Aleksandr Filippenko (born 1944), Russian actor
- Alex Filippenko (born 1958), Ukrainian-American astrophysicist
- Arkady Filippenko (1912–1983), Ukrainian-Soviet composer

== See also ==
- Filipenko
- Yurii Felipenko
- Pilipenko
