= Dnipro Line =

Previous defensive line in Southern Ukraine

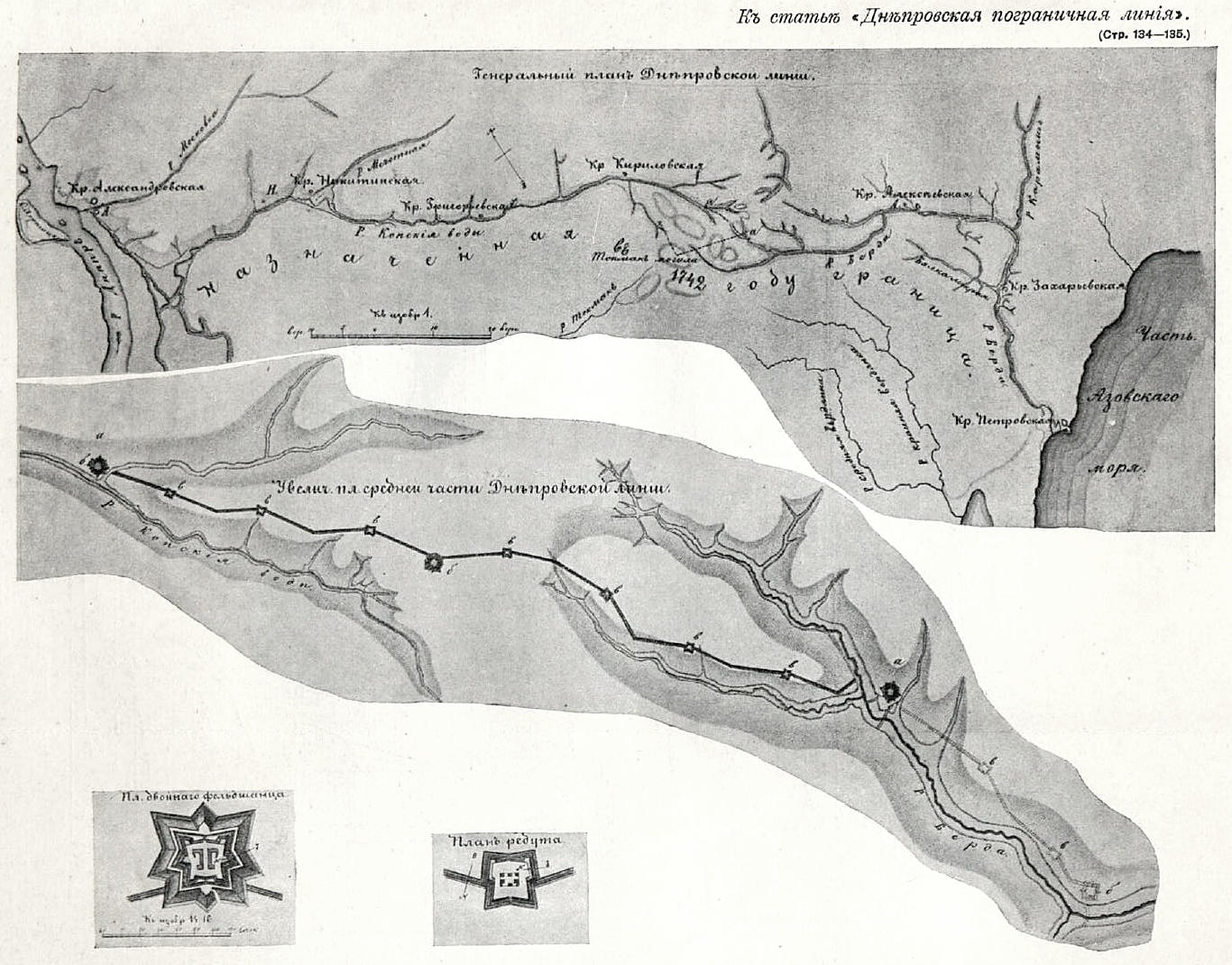
Dnipro Line

The Dnieper Line was a line of fortifications built by the Russian Empire during the Russo-Turkish War (1768–1774) stretching 180 kilometers from the bend of Dnieper to the shores of the Sea of Azov along the Konka and Berda rivers. In the north, the line hinged on the Alexandrian fortress, now Zaporizhzhia, and in the south on the Saint Peter fortress near the modern city of Berdiansk. The line lost its relevance and was abandoned after the annexation of the Crimean Khanate in 1783.

Originally it intended to include 14 fortresses and 2 retrenchments, but it only consisted of 7 fortresses along Konka waters.

== List of fortresses ==
- Alexandrian
- Nikitian
- Grigorian
- Cyrillian
- Alexian
- Zacharian
- Petrian
