= Vlad Savchenko =

Ukrainian film producer, and public activist

Vladyslav Savchenko (born November 17, 1991, in Zaporizhzhia) is a Ukrainian volunteer, producer, activist, and entrepreneur president of the European Association of Software Engineering (EASE). He is also a television expert in IT matters and crisis management.

He is the producer and creator of the First Code movie, the first feature-documentary film about IT in Ukraine, which became a box-office success in Ukraine. Savchenko supports the Ministry of Digital Transformation of Ukraine's initiatives, focusing on educating the population in digital literacy and computer skills.

== Early life and education ==
Vlad Savchenko was born on November 17, 1991, in Zaporizhzhia. He completed his education at Zaporizhzhia National University, earning a master's degree in Law and later pursuing doctoral studies at the Law Faculty.

== Career ==
In 2014, Savchenko founded the sports club Pitbull Boxing & Gym in Zaporizhzhia. In 2015, he established and became the CEO of Powercode, a software development company. The company has four offices in Ukraine and branches in Hong Kong, Singapore, Poland, Germany, and England. It also operates the educational centre "Powercode Academy".

In 2019, Savchenko became the laureate of the "Person of the Year – 2019" award in the "Manager of the Year" category.

In 2020, he founded the "European Association of Software Engineering," bringing together IT companies from Ukraine and Europe working on software development. EASE became the only Ukrainian community to present its booth with resident developments at the Dubai Expo 2020.

Also in 2020, during the COVID-19 lockdowns, Savchenko founded "Foodex24," an online supermarket with its own warehouses and production. In 2020, the National Register of Records of Ukraine included Foodex24 in its records for the fastest opening of an online supermarket. In September 2021, Savchenko's company acquired the food delivery service "Fresh Food" for $300,000. In 2021, the company expanded its operations to Poland, achieving an annual turnover of $8 million. After Russia's full-scale invasion of Ukraine, Savchenko sold a part of Foodex24 operating in Poland to the founders of the Best Market chain, and the project in Ukraine was suspended.

== Public and art activities ==
In 2023 the feature documentary film First Code was released, depicting the emergence of Ukrainian IT and its operation during the full-scale invasion. Savchenko served as both the producer and investor of the film.

He is an expert and author in the media on issues of digitization and IT development in Ukraine and supports entrepreneurship development in the country.

Savchenko supports the Ministry of Digital Transformation of Ukraine's initiatives, focusing on educating the population in digital literacy and computer skills.

In 2020 his company opened an offline hub for free population training. PowerCode Academy signed a memorandum of cooperation with the Ministry of Digital Transformation; company's locations in Kyiv, Kharkiv and Zaporizhzhia became offline hubs of the "Diia. Digital Education" project.

In March 2020, during the COVID-19 pandemic, Savchenko initiated the "Stop Panic, Stop Coronavirus!" campaign, developing software for healthcare professionals.

== Personal life ==
Vladyslav Savchenko is married and has a daughter and a son.
