= Filipenko =

Filipenko is a Ukrainian patronymic surname derived from the given name Philip. Notable people with the surname include:

- Alexander Filipenko, Russian politician
- Sasha Filipenko (born 1984), Belarusian writer
- Stanislav Filipenko (1938–2025), Ukrainian circus artist
- Viktor Filipenkó, Hungarian tennis player
- Yegor Filipenko (born 1988), Belarusian footballer

== See also ==
- Filippenko
- Yurii Felipenko
- Pilipenko
