= Igor P. Kaidashev =

Igor Kaidashev (alternative spelling – Kaydashev)
- Born: May 30, 1969 (age 57)
- Education: Ukrainian Medical Stomatological Academy, Poltava
- Awards: Winner of the State Prize of Ukraine in Science and Technology (2018) Honored master of science and technology of Ukraine (2012) Academician of the Academy of Sciences of Higher Education of Ukraine on the Fundamental Issues of Medicine (2017)
- Scientific career
- Fields: Immunology, allergology
- Workplaces: Ukrainian Medical Stomatological Academy, Poltava Ukrainian Society of Immunology, Allergy and Immunorehabilitation

Igor Petrovych Kaidashev (Ukrainian: Ігор Петрович Кайдашев, Russian: Игорь Петрович Кайдашев; 30 May 1969, Zaporizhia, Ukraine) is a Ukrainian immunologist and allergist, MD, and Professor. Igor Kaidashev is President of the Ukrainian Society of Immunology, Allergy and Immunorehabilitation, Professor of the Department of Internal Medicine No. 3 with Phthisiology, and Vice-Rector for Research & Development at Poltava State Medical University (PSMU) since 2010.

== Academic degrees ==
1994 - Physician, Poltava State Medical Stomatological Institute in Poltava, (corresponding to MD)

1994 - Aspirantura (PhD training), Ukrainian Medical Stomatological Academy, Poltava, Ukraine.

1996 - Candidate of Medical Sciences (corresponding to PhD in Allergology and Immunology), National Medical University, Kyiv, Ukraine. Title of thesis: "Influence of surface glycoproteids of erythrocytes on the interaction of its membranes with neutrophil leukocytes and lymphocytes".

1998 - Senior Scientist (Immunology and Allergology), Higher Attestation Commission.

1999 - Doctor of Medical Sciences (Allergology and Immunology), National Medical University, Kyiv, Ukraine. Title of thesis: "Regulative natural peptide complex of kidneys: obtaining, physical and chemical properties, connection with major histocompatibility complex, immunobiological effects and the working out of pharmacological substance".

2001 - Professor (Immunology and Allergology), Higher Attestation Commission.

== Current positions ==
2010 – present: Prorector for Research and Development, Ukrainian Medical Stomatological Academy, Poltava, Ukraine.

2002 – present: Professor of the Department of Internal Medicine No 3 with Phthisiology, Ukrainian Medical Stomatological Academy, Poltava, Ukraine.

== Research ==
Prof. I.P. Kaidashev is the author and co-author of more than 600 scientific and research works, of which 101 articles are in journals indexed by "Scopus" database, h-index: 12.

== Awards and honorary titles ==
Prof. I.P. Kaidashev was awarded diplomas of the Academy of Medical Sciences of Ukraine, certificate of merit of the Ministry of Education and Science of Ukraine. In 2012, he was awarded the title of Honored Master of Science and Technology of Ukraine by the Order of the President of Ukraine No. 552/2012. In 2017, Prof. I.P. Kaidashev was elected an Academician of the Academy of Sciences of Higher Education of Ukraine at the Department of Fundamental Problems of Medicine. In 2018, Prof. I.P. Kaidashev was awarded the State Prize of Ukraine in Science and Technology by the Presidential Decree No. 110/2019.

== Organisation and participation in scientific meetings ==
Presentations and chairmanship at International Scientific Conferences and Congresses:

- "PAPRICA” Symposium (Primary Allergy for PRImary CAre Physicians), 5 October 2005, Kyiv, Ukraine (organisation and presentation).
- The Congress of World Allergy Organisation, Saint Petersburg, Russia, 2006 (presentation).
- European Academy of Allergology and Clinical Immunology (EAACI) Congress, Barcelona, 2008 (presentation).
- American Academy of Allergy, Asthma & Immunology 2008 Annual Meeting, 14–18 March 2008, Philadelphia, Pennsylvania (presentation).
- EAACI Congress – 2009. Warsaw, 07-10 June 2009 (presentation).
- EAACI Congress – 2010. London, 5–9 June 2010 (presentation).
- International Clinical Immunology Workshop, Yalta (Crimea, Ukraine), 7–10 October 2010 (organisation and presentation).
- EAACI Congress – 2011. Istanbul, 11–15 June 2011 (presentation).
- EAACI Congress – 2012. Geneva, 16–20 June 2012 (presentation).
- EAACI-WAO World Allergy and Asthma Congress, Milan, 22–26 June 2013 (chairmanship and presentation).
- EAACI Congress – 2014. Copenhagen, 7–11 June 2014 (chairmanship and presentation).
- EAACI Congress – 2015. Barcelona, 6–10 June 2015 (chairmanship and presentation).
- 6-th International Christian Conference for Young Medical Professionals “Christ and Healthcare: Healing and Health”, 16–18 October 2015, Poltava, Ukraine (organisation and presentation).
- EAACI Congress – 2016. Vienna, 11–15 June 2016 (chairmanship and presentation).

== Commissions of trust ==
- "Allergy & Immunology". European Medical Journal. Archived from the original on 30 June 2017.
- Ad hoc reviewer of journals “Allergia, Astma, Immunologia” (Poland), “The Medical and Ecological Problems” (Ukraine), “Allergology and Immunology” (Ukraine), “The Annals of Allergy, Asthma and Immunology” (USA).
- Reviewer and editorial board member of scientific journals “Problems of Ecology and Medicine”, “Bulletin of Problems Biology and Medicine”, “Topical Problems of Modern Medicine”, “World of Medicine and Biology”, “Ukrainian Dental Almanac”, registered with and recommended by State Commission for Academic Degrees and Titles.
- Member of workgroup of Ministry of Public Health of Ukraine on Drug Allergy.
- 2005-2010 – Member of the Board of Problem Commission “Clinical Immunology and Allergology” of Ukrainian Ministry of Health Public Service and National Academy of Medical Sciences.
- 2013–present – Academic Coordinator of Erasmus+ mobility projects (MEDEA Consortium, International Credit Mobility Programme) at Ukrainian Medical Stomatological Academy.
- 2015-2018 – Member of the Commission of Medical Sciences (Polish Academy of Sciences, Branch in Lublin).

== Publications from the last 10 years (most representative ones) ==
- Hellings PW, Fokkens W, Bachert C, (...) Kaidashev I. et al. Positioning the principles of precision medicine in care pathways for allergic rhinitis and chronic rhinosinusitis − A EUFOREA-ARIA- EPOS-AIRWAYS ICP statement. Allergy. 2017 Sep;72(9):1297-1305. doi: 10.1111/all.13162
- Bousquet J, Bewick M, Cano A, (...) Kaidashev I. et al. Building Bridges for Innovation in Ageing: Synergies between Action Groups of the EIP on AHA. J Nutr Health Aging. 2017;21(1):92-104. doi: 10.1007/s12603-016-0803-1.
- Bousquet J, Farrell J, (...) Kaidashev I, et al. Scaling up strategies of the chronic respiratory disease programme of the European Innovation Partnership on Active and Healthy Ageing (Action Plan B3: Area 5). Clin Transl Allergy. 2016; 6: 29. doi: 10.1186/s13601-016-0116-9.
- Bousquet J, Schunemann HJ, (...) Kaidashev IP, et al. MACVIA clinical decision algorithm in adolescents and adults with allergic rhinitis. J Allergy Clin Immunol. 2016; 38(2): 367–374. doi: 10.1016/j.jaci.2016.03.025.
- Bousquet J, Schunemann HJ, (...) Kaidashev I, et al. MACVIA-ARIA Sentinel NetworK for allergic rhinitis (MASK-rhinitis): The new generation guideline implementation. Allergy: European Journal of Allergy and Clinical Immunology. 2015; Volume 70, Issue 11: 1372–1392
- Mamontova TV, Mykytiuk MV, Bobrova NO, Kutsenko LO, Vesnina LE, Kaidashev IP. The anti-inflammatory effect of fullerene C60 on adjuvant arthritis in rats. Fiziolohichnyi zhurnal. 2013; Volume 59, Issue 3: 102–110
- Lavrenko AV, Shlykova OA, Kutsenko LA, Mamontova TV, Kaidashev IP. Pharmacogenetic features of the effect of metformin in patients with coronary heart disease in the presence of metabolic syndrome and type 2 diabetes mellitus in terms of PPAR-г2 gene polymorphism. Terapevticheskii Arkhiv. 2012; Volume 84, Issue 9: 35–40
- Vesnina LE, Mamontova TV, Mykytiuk MV, Kutsenko LO, Bobrova NO, Kutsenko NL, Kaidashev IP. The condition of lipid peroxidation in mice and the effect of fullerene C60 during immune response. Fiziolohichnyi zhurnal. 2012; Volume 58, Issue 3: 19–26
- Bobrova NA, Mikitiuk MV, Kutsenko LA, Kaidashev IP. Effect of fullerene C60 on free-radical induced lipid peroxidation processes in bronchial asthma. Patologicheskaia fiziologiia i eksperimental'naia terapiia. 2012; Issue 3: 109–114
- Kutsenko NL, Izmailova OV, Vesnina LE, Kaidashev IP. Role of toll-like receptor 2 and 4 gene polymorphisms in the development of allergic diseases with increased IgE levels. Cytology and Genetics. 2012; Volume 46, Issue 6: 379–383
- File TM, Low DE, (...), Kaydashev IP. FOCUS 1: a randomized, double-blinded, multicentre, Phase III trial of the efficacy and safety of ceftaroline fosamil versus ceftriaxone in community-acquired pneumonia. Journal of Antimicrobial Chemotherapy. 2011; Volume 66, Issue suppl 3: iii19-iii32
- Vinnik NI, Kutsenko LA, Kutsenko NL, Solokhina IL, Mikitiuk MV, Mamontova TV, Kaidashev IP. The effectiveness of pioglitazone in the treatment of patients with coronary heart disease on the background of metabolic syndrome. Likars'ka sprava. 2011; Issue 3-4: 71–78
- Vesnina LE, Mamontova TV, Mikityuk MV, Kutsenko NL, Kutsenko LA, Bobrova NA, Berkalo LV, Kaidashev IP. Effect of fullerene C60 on functional activity of phagocytic cells. Eksperimental'naya i Klinicheskaya Farmakologiya. 2011; Volume 74, Issue 6: 26–29

== Research Monographs ==
- “The Physiological Activity of Peptic Pancreatic Extract” (2006);
- “Sketches on Immunobiology of Oral Mucosa” (2008);
- “Single-Session Method of Pulpitis Treatment” (2011);
- “Drug Hypersensitivity” (2016).
