= Balabyne =

Rural locality in Zaporizhzhia Oblast, Ukraine

Balabyne Балабине
- Rural settlement
- Location of Balabyne in Zaporizhzhia Oblast Balabyne (Ukraine)
- Coordinates: 47°44′39″N 35°13′13″E
- Country: Ukraine
- Oblast: Zaporizhzhia Oblast
- Raion: Zaporizhzhia Raion
- Founded: 1777
- Settlement status: 1938

Area
  - Total: 2.613 km^{2} (1.009 sq mi)
- Elevation: 35 m (115 ft)

Population (2022)
  - Total: 5,850 ▼
  - Density: 2,240/km^{2} (5,800/sq mi)
- Time zone: UTC+2 (EET)
  - Summer (DST): UTC+3 (EEST)
- Postal code: 70435–436
- Area code: +380 61
- Climate: Dfa
- Website: http://rada.gov.ua/

Balabyne (Ukrainian: Балабине; Russian: Балабино) is a rural settlement in Zaporizhzhia Raion, Zaporizhzhia Oblast, southern Ukraine. Balabyne is the administrative center of the Balabyne Council, a local government area. It belongs to Kushuhum settlement hromada, one of the hromadas of Ukraine. Population: 5,850 (2022 estimate). In 2001, population was 5,668 according to the census.

== History ==
The settlement was first founded in 1777 as the village of Petrivska (Ukrainian: Петрівська). In 1938, it was renamed to Balabyne and given the status of an urban-type settlement. It is located on the left bank of the Kakhovka Reservoir, just south of Zaporizhzhia's Komunarskyi District.

Until 26 January 2024, Balabyne was designated urban-type settlement. On this day, a new law entered into force which abolished this status, and Balabyne became a rural settlement.
