= Zaporizhzhia =

City and administrative centre of Zaporizhzhia Oblast, Ukraine

Zaporizhzhia Запоріжжя
- City

Ukrainian transcription(s)
  - National/"BGN/PCGN": Zaporizhzhia
  - ALA-LC: Zaporiz͡hz͡hi͡a
  - Scholarly: Zaporižžja
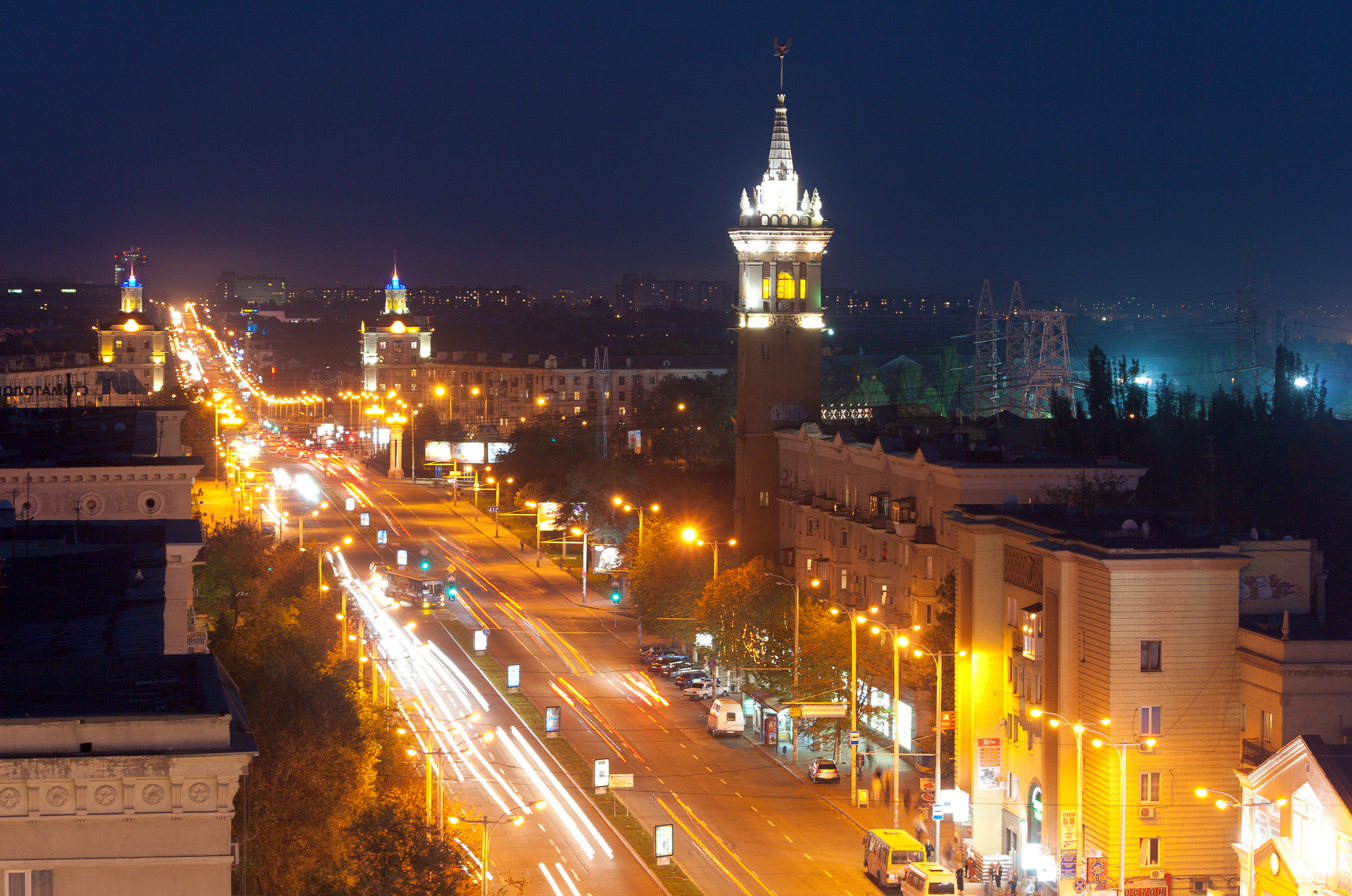
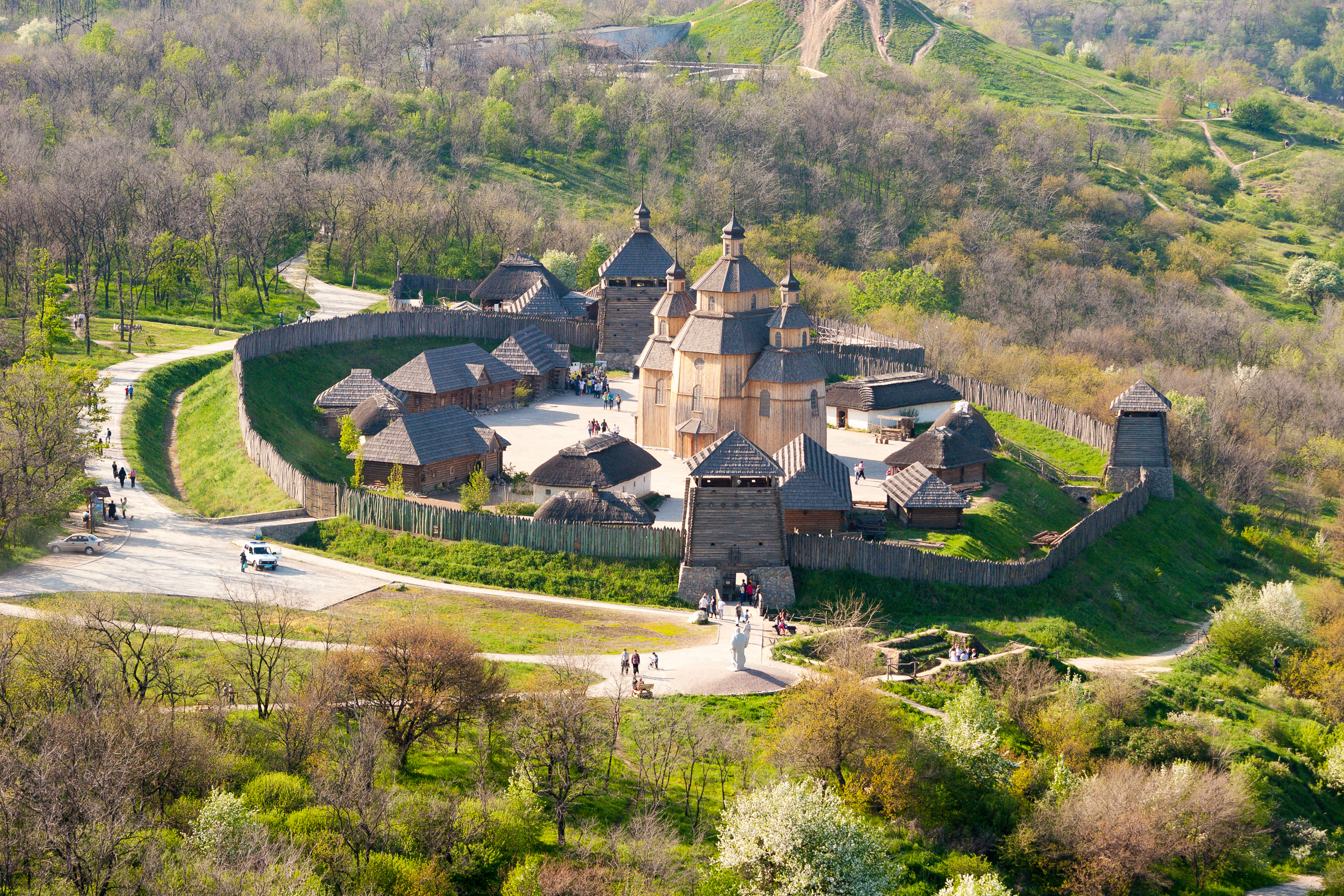
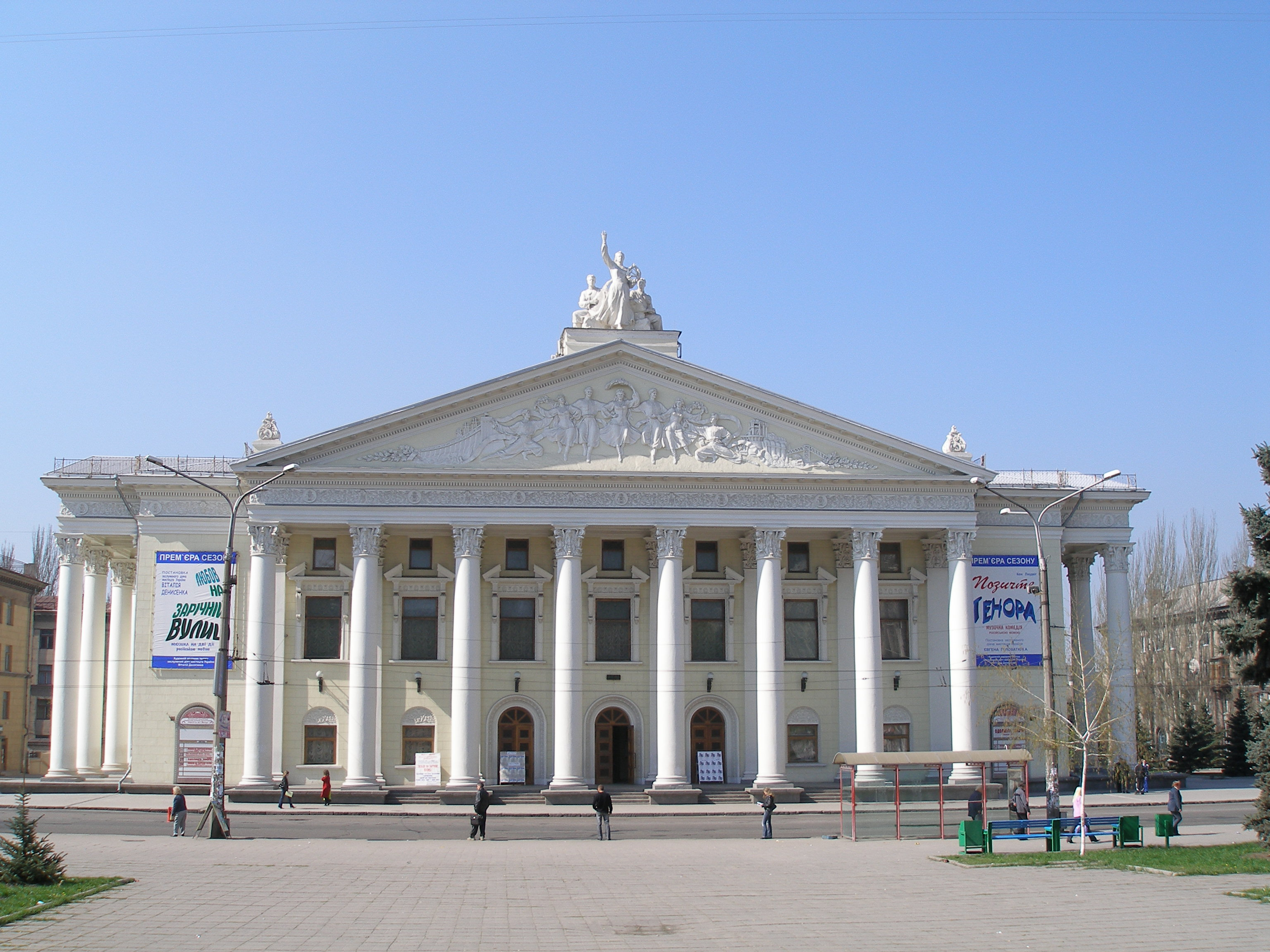
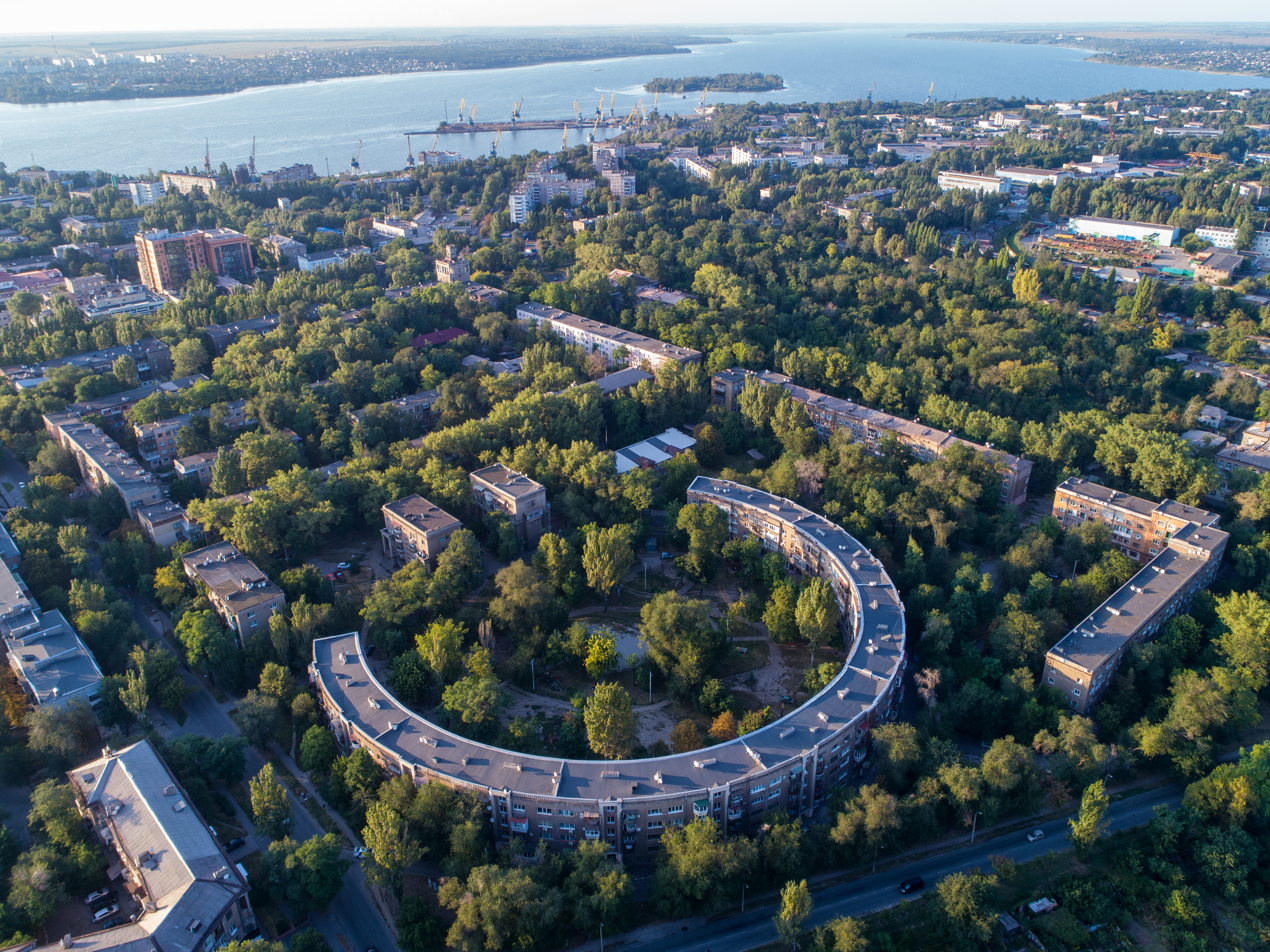
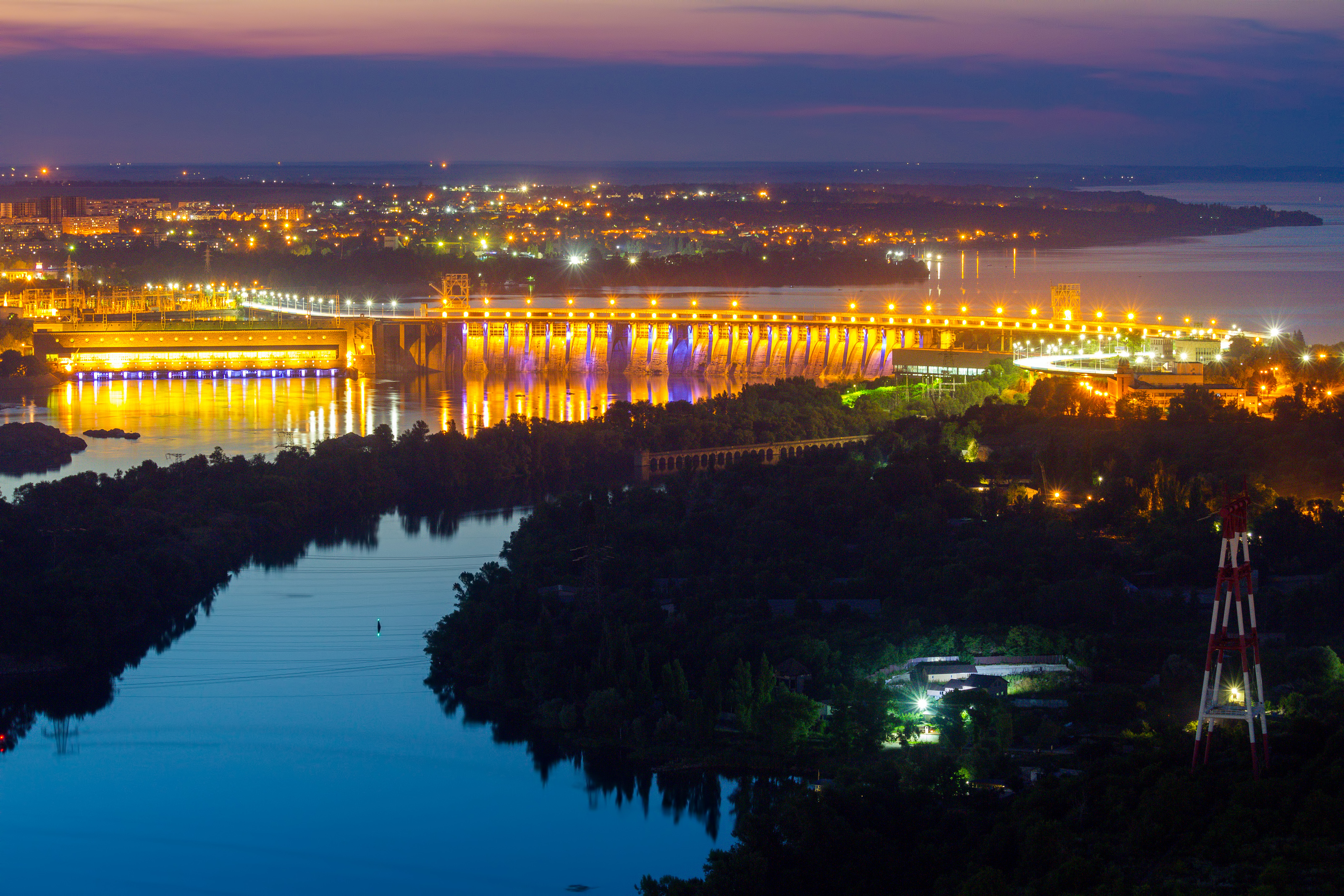
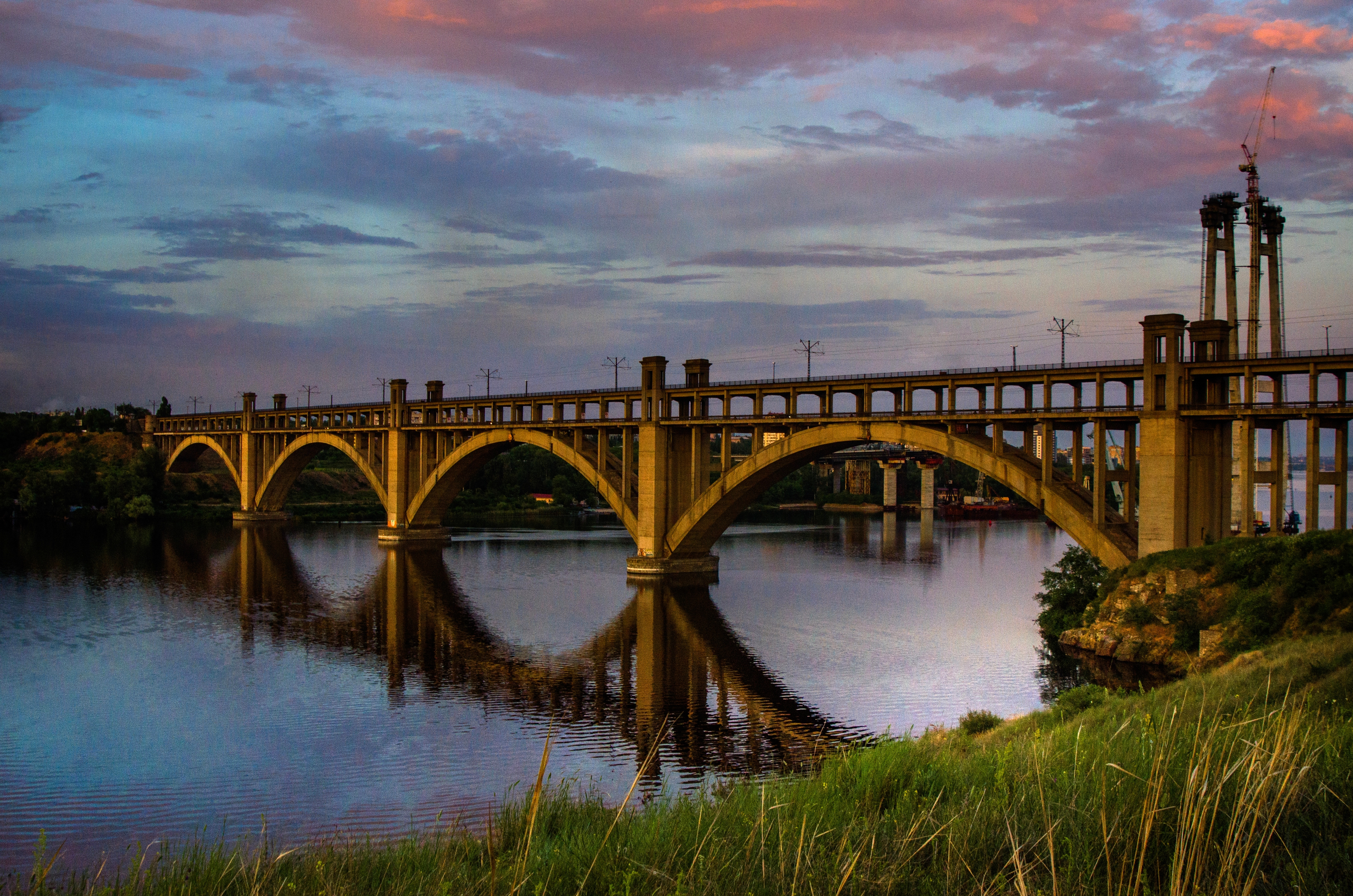
- Sobornyi Avenue Zaporozhian Sich Historical-Cultural Complex Zaporizhzhia Musical and Drama Theatre Sotsmisto Dnieper Hydroelectric Station Preobrazhensky Bridge

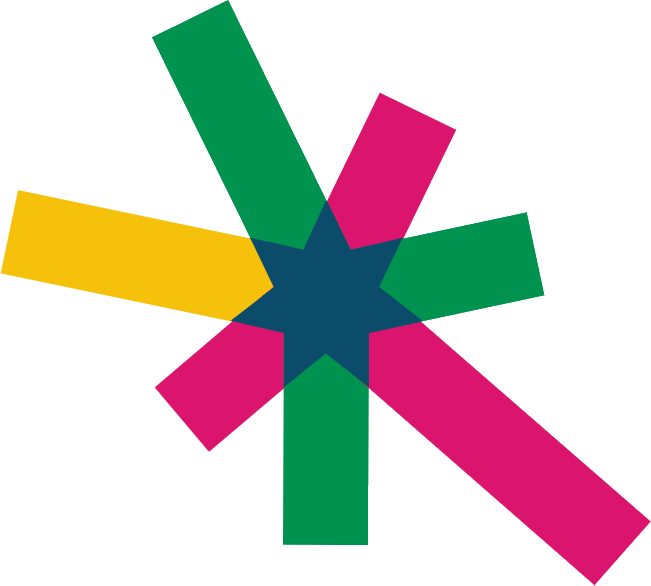
- Flag Coat of arms Logo
- Interactive map of Zaporizhzhia
- Location within Zaporizhzhia Oblast Location within Ukraine
- Coordinates: 47°51′00″N 35°07′03″E
- Country: Ukraine
- Oblast: Zaporizhzhia Oblast
- Raion: Zaporizhzhia Raion
- Hromada: Zaporizhzhia urban hromada
- Founded: 1770
- City rights: 1806
- Districts: 7: Zavodskyi District; Khortytskyi District; Kosmichnyi District; Dniprovskyi District; Oleksandrivskyi District; Voznesenivskyi District; Shevchenkivskyi District

Government
  - Mayor: Rehina Kharchenko

Area
  - City: 334 km^{2} (129 sq mi)
  - Metro: 4,675 km^{2} (1,805 sq mi)

Population (2022)
  - City: 710,052
  - Density: 1,365.2/km^{2} (3,536/sq mi)
  - Metro: 840,866
- Time zone: UTC+2 (EET)
  - Summer (DST): UTC+3 (EEST)
- Postal code: 69xxx
- Area code: +380 61(2)
- Climate: Dfa

Zaporizhzhia, (Note: Ukrainian: Запоріжжя, pronounced [zɐpoˈr⁽ʲ⁾iʒːɐ]; Russian: Запорожье, romanized: Zaporozhye, pronounced [zəpɐˈroʐjɪ]; also spelled as Zaporizhzhya or Zaporizhia.) formerly known as Aleksandrovsk or Oleksandrivsk until 1921, (Note: Russian: Александровск; Ukrainian: Олександрівськ.) is a city in southeast Ukraine, situated on the banks of the Dnieper River. It is the administrative centre of Zaporizhzhia Oblast. Zaporizhzhia has a population of 710,052 (2022 estimate).

Zaporizhzhia is known for the historic island of Khortytsia, multiple power stations and for being an important industrial centre. Steel, aluminium, aircraft engines, automobiles, transformers for substations, and other heavy industrial goods are produced in the region.

== Names and etymology ==
The name Zaporizhzhia refers to the position of the city: "beyond the rapids"—downstream or south of the Dnieper Rapids. These were previously an impediment to navigation and the site of important portages. In 1932, the rapids were flooded to become part of the reservoir of the Dnieper Hydroelectric Station.

Before 1921, the city was called Aleksandrovsk (or Oleksandrivsk), named after the original fortress that formed a part of the Dnieper Defence Line of the Russian Empire.

== History ==
Zaporizhzhia was founded in 1770, when the Aleksandrovskaya (Александровская) Fortress was built as a part of the Dnieper Defence Line, to protect the southern territories of the Russian Empire from Crimean Tatar invasions. Following the Treaty of Küçük Kaynarca in 1775, the southern lands of the East European Plain and the Crimean peninsula were absorbed into the Russian Empire. The Aleksandrovskaya Fortress then lost its military significance, and became a small rural town, which from 1806 to around 1930 was called Alexandrovsk.

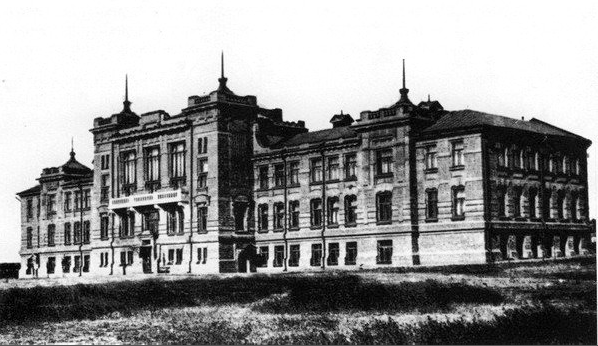
Trade school in 1911

The opening of the Kichkas Bridge at the start of the 20th century, the first rail crossing of the Dnieper, was followed by the industrial growth of Zaporizhzhia. In 1916, during World War I, the DEKA Stock Association transferred its aircraft engine manufacturing plant from Saint Petersburg to Zaporizhzhia.

During the Ukrainian War of Independence and Russian Civil War (1917–1921), Zaporizhzhia was the scene of fierce fighting between the Red Army and the White armies of Denikin and Wrangel, Petliura's Ukrainian People's Army of the Ukrainian People's Republic, and German-Austrian troops. The opposing armies used the strategically important Kichkas Bridge to transfer troops, ammunition, and medical supplies. Afterwards, it became the capital of the newly formed Zaporizhzhia Governorate of Ukraine.

The Soviet government industrialized Zaporizhzhia still further during the 1920s and 1930s, when the Dnieper Hydroelectric Station, and the Zaporizhzhia Steel Plant, and the Dnieper Aluminium Plant were built. In the 1930s, the American United Engineering and Foundry Company built a strip mill similar to the Ford River Rouge steel mill to produce rolling steel strip. The annual capacity of the mill reached 540,000 tonnes (600,000 short tons) of 170 cm (66 inches) wide steel.

=== World War II (1941–1945) ===
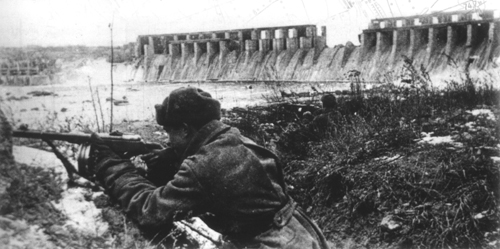
A Red Army soldier near the Dnieper hydro-electric dam

After the outbreak of the War between the USSR and Nazi Germany in June 1941, the Soviet government began evacuating Zaporizhzhia's industries to Siberia. and the Soviet security forces began shooting political prisoners in the city. On 18 August 1941, elements of the German 1st Panzergruppe reached the outskirts of Zaporizhzhia on the right bank and seized the island of Khortytsia.

The Red Army blew a 120-by-10-metre (394 ft × 33 ft) hole in the Dnieper hydroelectric dam on 18 August 1941, producing a flood wave that swept from Zaporizhzhia to Nikopol. The flood killed local residents as well as soldiers from both armies, with historians estimating a death toll between 20,000 and 100,000. Despite reinforcements, Zaporizhzhia was taken on 3 October 1941. The German occupation lasted two years; during which the Germans shot over 35,000 people, and sent 58,000 people to Germany as forced labourers.

The Germans reformed Army Group South in February 1943, and put its headquarters in Zaporizhzhia. Adolf Hitler visited the headquarters in February 1943, and again the following month, where he was briefed by Field Marshal Eric von Manstein and his air force counterpart Field Marshal Wolfram Freiherr von Richthofen, and in September 1943, the month the Army Group moved its headquarters to Kirovohrad.

In August 1943, the Germans built the Panther-Wotan defence line along the Dnieper from Kyiv to Crimea. They retreated to this line in September 1943, holding the city as a bridgehead over the Dnieper with elements of 40th Panzer and 17th Corps. The Soviet Southwestern Front, commanded by Army General Rodion Malinovsky, attacked Zaporizhzhia on 10 October 1943. The defenders repelled these attacks, but the Red Army launched a surprise night attack on 13 October, which succeeded in reclaiming most parts of the city.

=== 1991–present ===
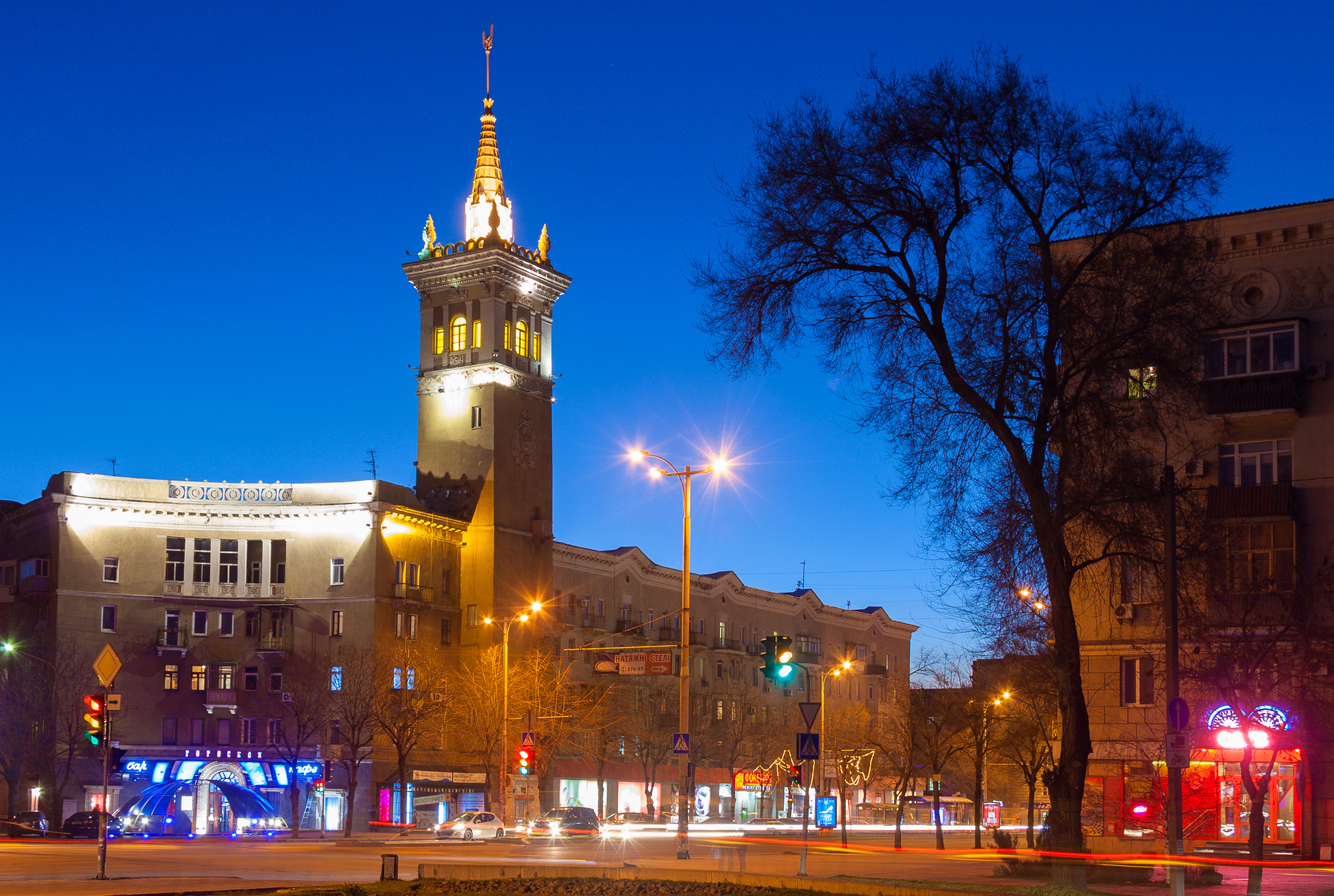
Modern Zaporizhzhia (2015)

In 2004, to alleviate congestion around the Zaporizhzhia Arch Bridge area, construction began on the New Zaporizhzhia Dniper Bridge, although construction was halted soon after it began, due to a lack of funding.

==== Russo-Ukrainian War ====
During the 2014 Euromaidan regional state administration occupations, during protests against President Viktor Yanukovych, Zaporizhzhia's regional state administration building was occupied by 4,500 protesters, and there were clashes between Ukrainian and pro-Russian activists in April 2014.

On 19 May 2016, the Verkhovna Rada approved the "Decommunisation Law". Since the introduction of the law, the Zaporizhzhia City Council has renamed over 50 streets and administrative areas of the city, (Note: Since modern Zaporizhiazhia was greatly enlarged in the Soviet Union, many typography in the city had to be renamed. In the year of the fall of the Russian Empire (1917), the population of Alexandrovsk was about 60,000 people. In the year of Ukraine's declaration of independence (1991), the city's population reached almost 1 million people.) monuments of the Soviet Union leaders Lenin and Felix Dzerzhinsky have been destroyed, and names honouring Soviet leaders in the titles of industrial plants, factories, culture centres, and the DniproHES have been removed.

===== Russian invasion (2022) =====
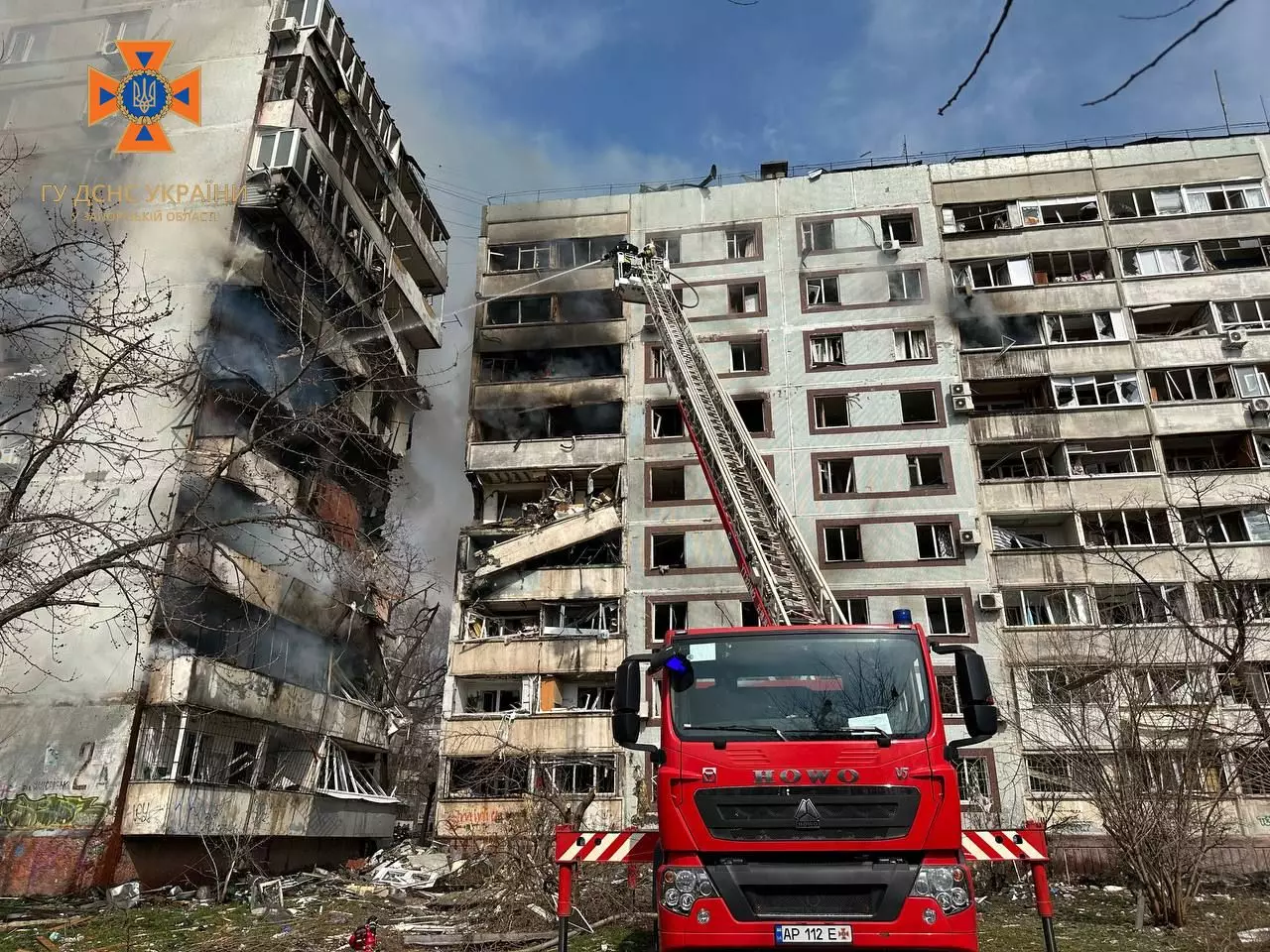
Residential buildings in Zaporizhzhia after Russian missile strikes on 22 March 2023

Russian forces have been engaged in ongoing attacks on Zaporizhzhia since the beginning of the 2022 Russian invasion of Ukraine. On 27 February, fighting was reported in the southern outskirts, and Russian forces began shelling the city later that evening. Russia invaded and occupied part of Zaporizhzhia Oblast but failed to take Zaporizhzhia itself. On 3 March, Russian forces approached the Zaporizhzhia Nuclear Power Plant, raising concerns about a potential nuclear meltdown. Russian military forces fired missiles on Zaporizhzhia on the evening of 12/13 May.

On 30 September, hours before Russia formally annexed Southern and Eastern Ukraine, the Russian Armed Forces launched S-300 missiles at a civilian convoy in Zaporizhzhia, killing at least 30 people. On 9 October, Russian forces launched rockets at residential buildings, killing at least 17 people.

== Geography ==
Zaporizhzhia is located in south-eastern Ukraine. The Dnieper splits the city in two; between them is Khortytsia Island. The city covers 334 km^{2} (129 sq mi) at an elevation of 50 m (160 ft) above sea level. The New and Old Dnieper flow past around Khortytsia: The New Dnieper is about 800 m (2,600 feet) wide while the Old Dnieper is about 200 m (660 feet) wide. The island size is 12 km × 2 km (7.5 mi × 1.2 mi). Smaller rivers in the city also enter the Dnieper: Sukha and Mokra Moskovka, Kushuhum, and Verkhnia Khortytsia.

The flora of Khortytsia is unique and diverse, due to the dry steppe air and a large freshwater basin, which cleans the air polluted by industry. The island is a national park. The ground surface is cut by large ravines ("balka"), hiking routes and historical monuments. The island, which is a popular recreational area, has sanatoriums, resorts, health centres, and sandy beaches.

=== Climate ===
Climate data for Zaporizhzhia (1991–2020, extremes 1959–present)
Month	Jan	Feb	Mar	Apr	May	Jun	Jul	Aug	Sep	Oct	Nov	Dec	Year
Record high °C (°F)	12.2 (54.0)	17.1 (62.8)	24.0 (75.2)	31.4 (88.5)	35.9 (96.6)	36.5 (97.7)	39.5 (103.1)	40.2 (104.4)	35.9 (96.6)	35.0 (95.0)	20.9 (69.6)	16.0 (60.8)	40.2 (104.4)
Mean daily maximum °C (°F)	−0.3 (31.5)	1.2 (34.2)	7.5 (45.5)	16.1 (61.0)	22.6 (72.7)	26.6 (79.9)	29.3 (84.7)	29.0 (84.2)	22.7 (72.9)	14.7 (58.5)	6.5 (43.7)	1.3 (34.3)	14.8 (58.6)
Daily mean °C (°F)	−3.1 (26.4)	−2.2 (28.0)	3.0 (37.4)	10.5 (50.9)	16.7 (62.1)	20.9 (69.6)	23.2 (73.8)	22.6 (72.7)	16.7 (62.1)	9.7 (49.5)	3.1 (37.6)	−1.3 (29.7)	10.0 (50.0)
Mean daily minimum °C (°F)	−5.8 (21.6)	−5.3 (22.5)	−0.9 (30.4)	5.0 (41.0)	10.9 (51.6)	15.2 (59.4)	17.1 (62.8)	16.4 (61.5)	11.3 (52.3)	5.5 (41.9)	0.2 (32.4)	−3.8 (25.2)	5.5 (41.9)
Record low °C (°F)	−29.3 (−20.7)	−26.1 (−15.0)	−25 (−13)	−8.2 (17.2)	−2 (28)	3.9 (39.0)	8.2 (46.8)	3.9 (39.0)	−3 (27)	−8.9 (16.0)	−18.6 (−1.5)	−26.2 (−15.2)	−29.3 (−20.7)
Average precipitation mm (inches)	39 (1.5)	32 (1.3)	37 (1.5)	41 (1.6)	51 (2.0)	61 (2.4)	45 (1.8)	44 (1.7)	38 (1.5)	34 (1.3)	40 (1.6)	53 (2.1)	515 (20.3)
Average extreme snow depth cm (inches)	7 (2.8)	8 (3.1)	4 (1.6)	0 (0)	0 (0)	0 (0)	0 (0)	0 (0)	0 (0)	0 (0)	1 (0.4)	3 (1.2)	8 (3.1)
Average rainy days	10	8	11	12	13	13	10	8	10	11	13	11	130
Average snowy days	14	14	9	1	0	0	0	0	0	1	6	13	58
Average relative humidity (%)	85.8	82.6	76.3	66.5	64.3	64.5	62.5	60.6	67.6	76.6	83.9	86.5	73.1
Source 1: Pogoda.ru.net
Source 2: NOAA (humidity 1991–2020)

== Governance ==
Zaporizhzhia is the main city of Zaporizhzhia Oblast with a form of self-rule within the oblast. The city is divided into 7 urban districts.

Population of the districts of the city of Zaporizhzhia as of 1 November 2015
No.	Raion	Population	Percent of Total
1	Oleksandrivskyi	68,666	9.06
2	Zavodskyi	50,750	6.7
3	Kosmichnyi	133,752	17.64
4	Dniprovskyi	135,934	17.95
5	Voznesenivskyi	101,349	13.37
6	Khortytskyi	115,641	15.27
7	Shevchenkivskyi	151,558	20.0

Districts of Zaporizhzhia

== Demographics ==
=== City population ===
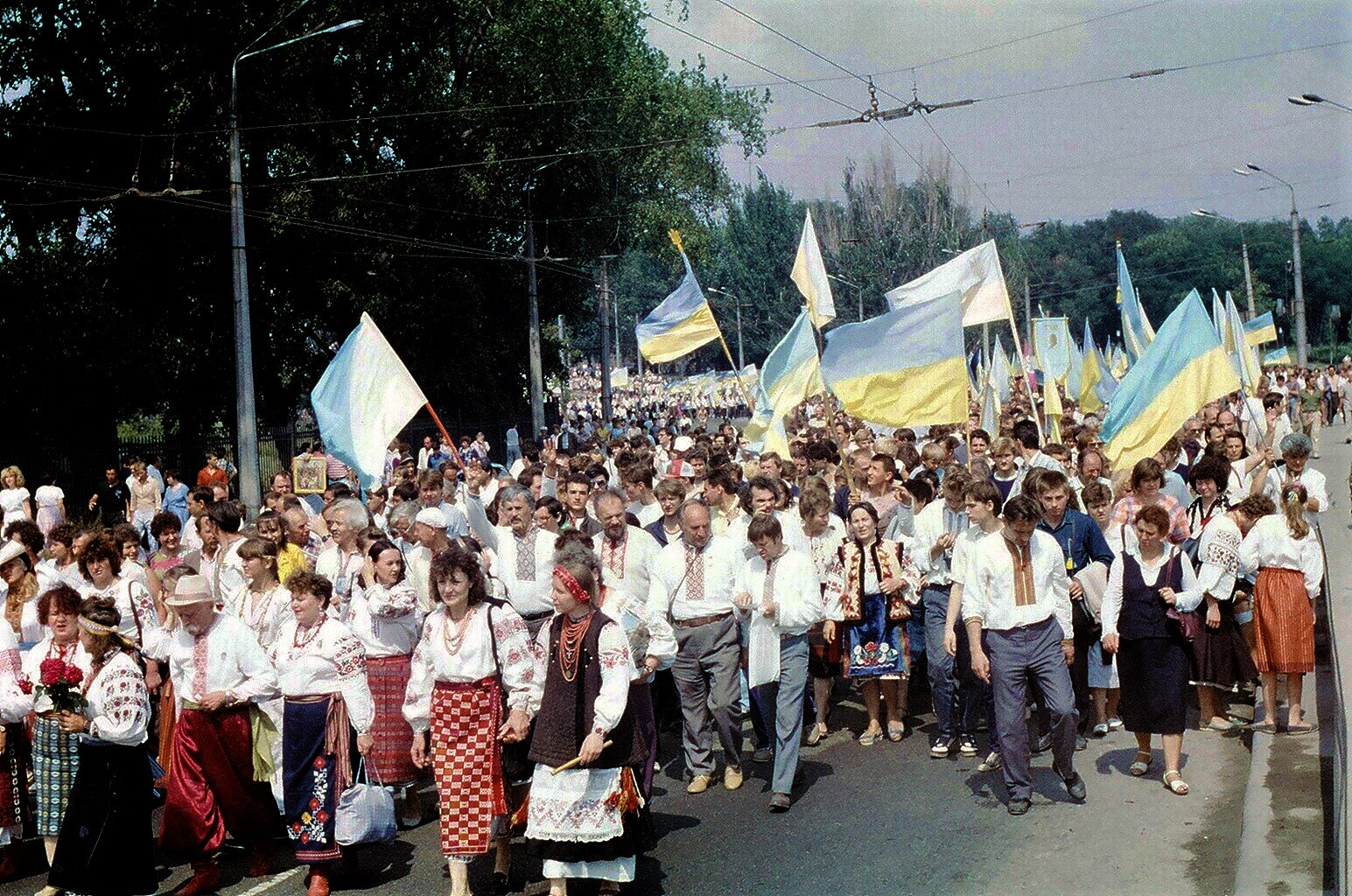
People in Zaporizhzhia in 1990

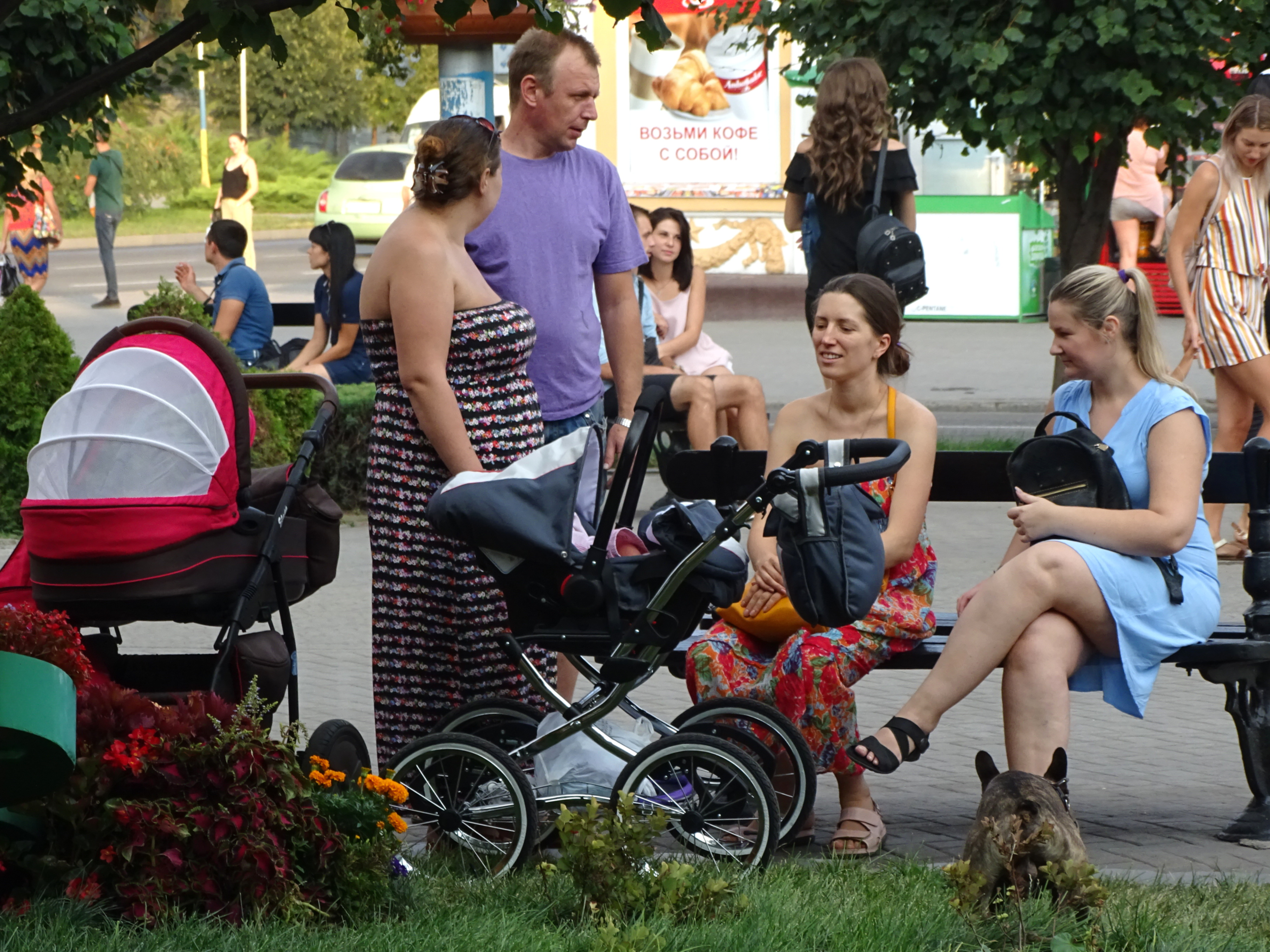
People in Zaporizhzhia in 2018

Historical population
Year	Pop.	±%
1897	18,849	—
1926	55,260	+193.2%
1939	289,280	+423.5%
1959	434,638	+50.2%
1970	657,890	+51.4%
1979	780,745	+18.7%
1989	883,909	+13.2%
2001	815,256	−7.8%
2011	776,535	−4.7%
2022	710,052	−8.6%

The city population has been declining since the first years of state independence. In 2014–2015 the rate of the population decrease was −0.56%/year.

In January 2017, the population was 750,685. The total reduction of the population of the city since independence has been around 146,000 (not including 2017–2018).

Year	Population	Source
1781	329	
1795	1,230	
1804	2,500	
1824	1,716	
1859	3,100	
1861	3,819	
1864	4,354	
1870	4,601	
1885	6,707	
1894	16,100	
1897	16,393	

Year	Population	Source
1900	24,196	
1902	35,000	
1910	38,000	
1913	63,000	
1915	about 60,000	
1916	72,900	
1917	58,517	
1926	55,744	
1937	243,148	
1939	289,188	
1943	120,000	

year	Population	Source
1956	381,000	
1959	449,000	
1970	658,000	
1971	676,000	
1979	781,000	
1989	897,600	
1991	896,600	
2001	815,300	
2010	776,918	
2011	775,678	
2015	757,650	
2017	750,685	

=== Ethnic structure ===
According to the 2001 census, 70.28% of the population of Zaporizhzhia (total population 815,300) were Ukrainians, 25.39% were Russians, 0.67% were Belarusians, 0.44% were Bulgarians, 0.42% were Jews, 0.38% were Georgians, 0.38% were Armenians, 0.27% were Tatar, 0.15% were Azeris, 0.11% were Roma (Gypsies), 0.1% were Poles, 0.09% were Germans, 0.09% were Moldovans, and 0.07% were Greeks.

=== Language ===
Ukrainian is used for official government business. The native language of people living in Zaporizhzhia, according to censuses in Ukraine (by percent):

Language	1897	1926	1989	2001
Ukrainian	43.0	33.8	41.3	41.6
Russian	24.8	52.2	57.0	56.8
Yiddish	27.8	9.7	0.1	

=== Religion ===
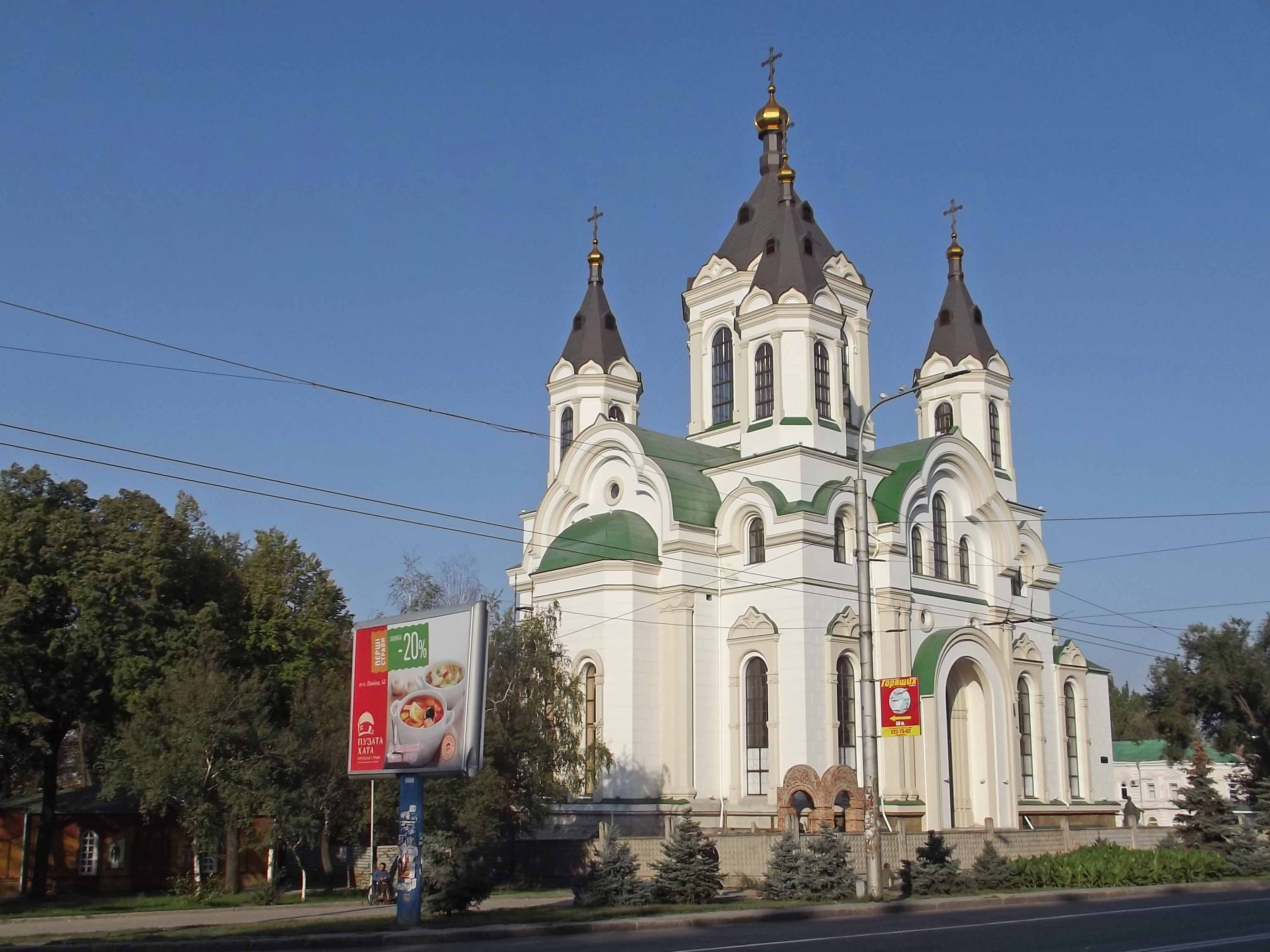
Holy Protection Cathedral

The following religious denominations are present in Zaporizhzhia:

- Christianity
  - Orthodoxy: Most citizens are Orthodox Christians of the Ukrainian Orthodox Church (Moscow Patriarchate) or Orthodox Church of Ukraine. Among the Orthodox churches the Church of the Intercession, which is under the Moscow Patriarchate, is most popular. There are also St. Nicholas Church and St. Andrew's Cathedral in the city.
  - Protestantism, represented by:
    - All-Ukrainian Union of Christians of Evangelical Faith
    - Seventh-day Adventist Church
    - Full Gospel Church
  - Catholicism, represented by:
    - Ukrainian Greek Catholic Church;
    - The Roman Catholic Church. The biggest Catholic church is the Church of God, the Father of Mercy.
- Judaism: Orthodox Judaism is represented by one union and six communities
- Islam: In the Zaporizhzhia district there are five communities which are part of the Spiritual Administration of Muslims of Ukraine and four independent Muslim communities.
- Hinduism: The city hosts a branch of the Vedic Academy.

== Economy ==
=== Industry ===
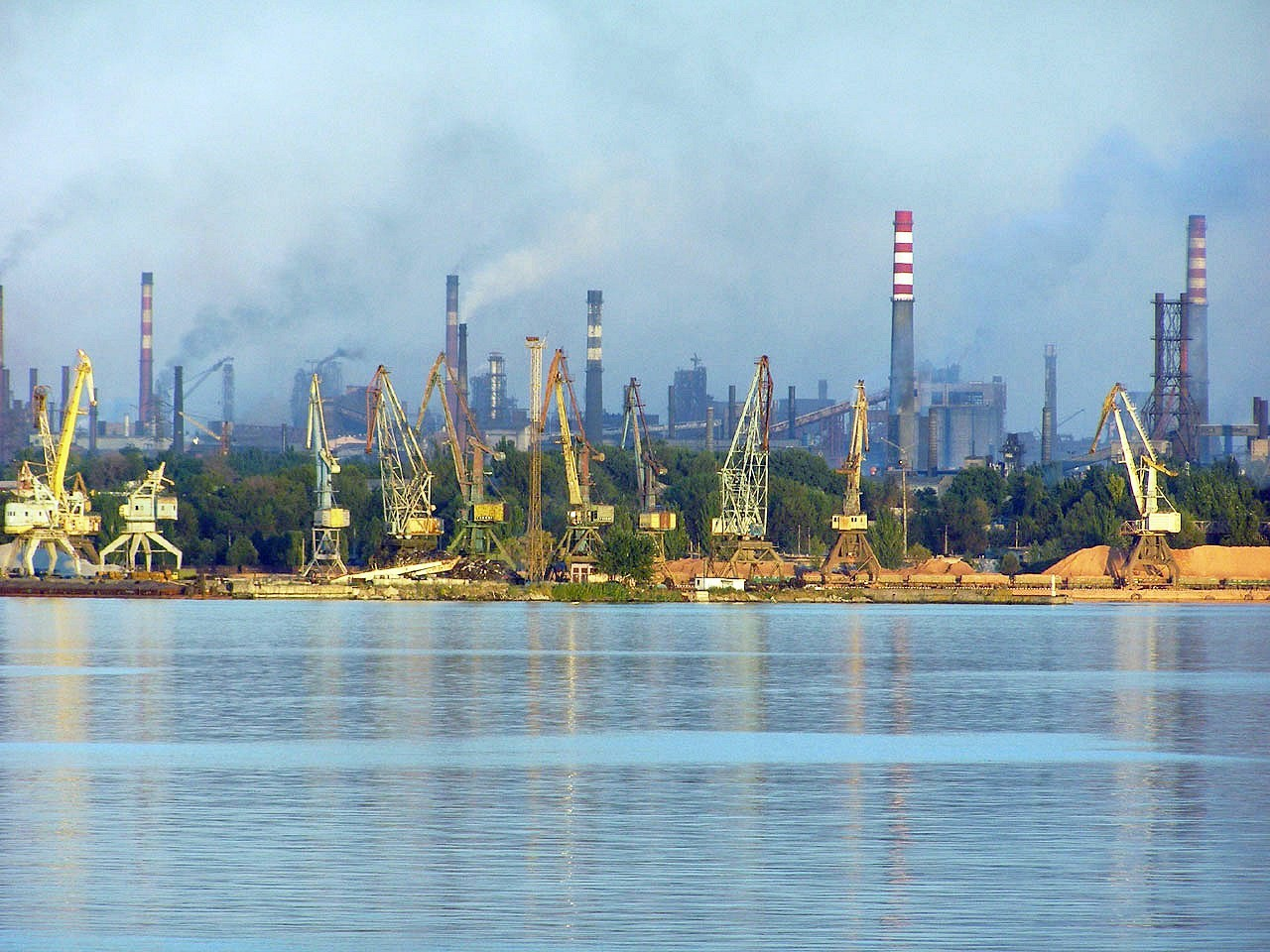
Industry and river port

Zaporizhzhia is an important industrial centre of Ukraine, the country's main car manufacturing company, the Motor-Sich aircraft engine manufacturer. Well supplied with electricity, Zaporizhzhia forms, together with the adjoining Donets Basin (Donbas) and the Nikopol manganese and Kryvyi Rih iron mines, one of Ukraine's leading industrial complexes.

The city is a home of Ukraine's main automobile production centre, which is based at the Zaporizhzhia Automobile Factory (ZAZ), producing Ukrainian car brands such as Zaporozhets and Tavria.

After the end of the Russian Revolution, the city became an important industrial centre. The presence of cheap labor and the proximity of deposits of coal, iron ore, and manganese created favorable conditions for large-scale enterprises of the iron and mechanical engineering industries. Today Zaporizhzhia is an important industrial centre of the region with heavy industry (particularly metallurgy), aluminium, and chemical industry. Cars, avia motors and radioelectronics are manufactured in the city. The port of Zaporizhzhia is important for transshipment for goods from the Donbas.

Zaporizhstal, Ukraine's fourth largest steelmaker, and ranking 54th in the world, is based in the city.

=== Electricity generation ===
Zaporizhzhia is a large electricity generating hub. There are hydroelectric power plant known as "DniproHES" Dnieper Hydroelectric Station and the largest nuclear power plant in Europe. Prior to the 2022 invasion, the plants generated about 25% of the Ukrainian electricity supply. Located near Enerhodar and about 60 km (37 miles) from Zaporizhzhia is the Zaporizhzhia thermal power station and the Zaporizhzhia Nuclear Power Plant, the largest nuclear power plant in Europe.

== Culture ==
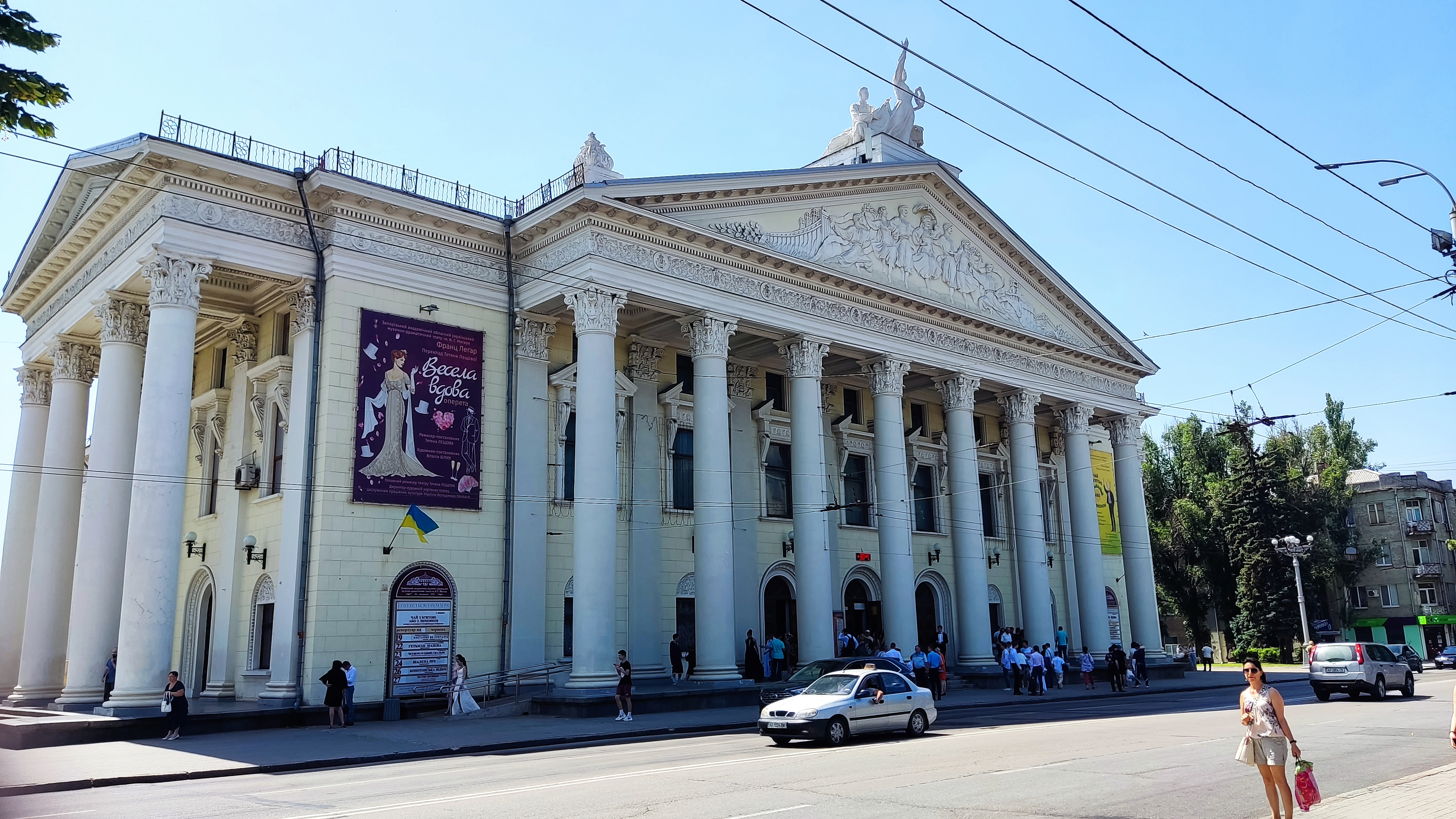
Magara Academic Drama Theatre

Zaporizhzhia has an orchestra, museums, theatres, and libraries. These include the Magara Academic Drama Theatre, the Municipal Theatre Lab "VIE", the Theatre for Young-Age spectators, the Theatre of Horse Riding "Zaporizhzhian Cossacks", the Zaporizhzhia Regional Museum, the National Museum of the History of the Zaporizhzhian Cossacks, the Zaporizhzhia Regional Art Museum, the Motor Sich Aviation Museum, and the Zaporizhzhia Region Universal Scientific Library.

There are a number of small amateur groups of folk music bands, art galleries in Zaporizhzhia. The city regularly holds festivals, Cossack martial arts competitions, and art exhibitions.

Zaporizhzhia has an open-air exhibition-and-sale of Zaporizhzhia city association of artists «Kolorit» near the 'Fountain of Life' at the Mayakovskoho square. A daily exhibition of artists' organizations of the city is a unique place in Zaporizhzhia, where people can meet craftsmen and artists, watch carving, embroidery, beading classes, and receive advice from professional artists and designers.

== Main sights ==
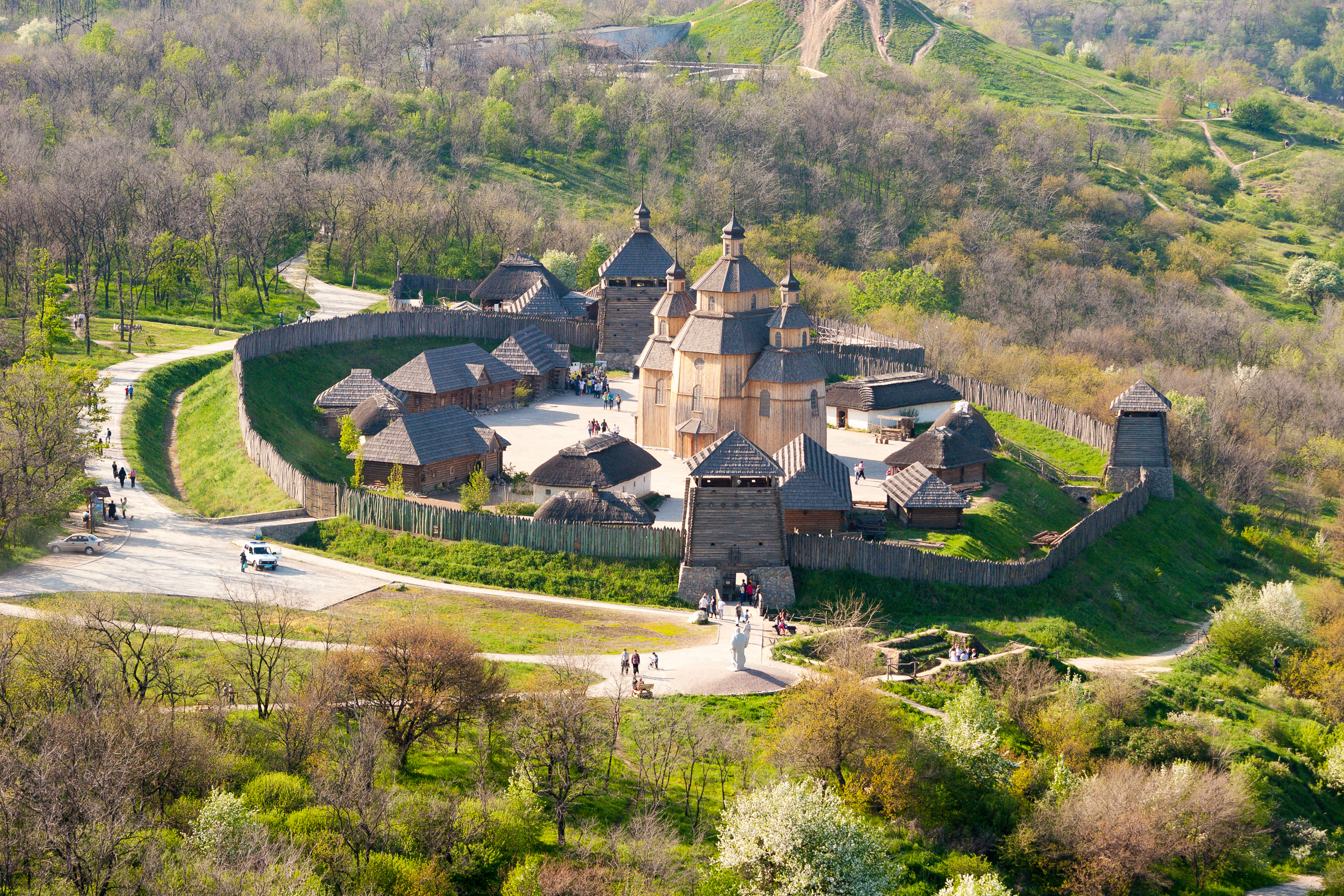
Khortytsya island

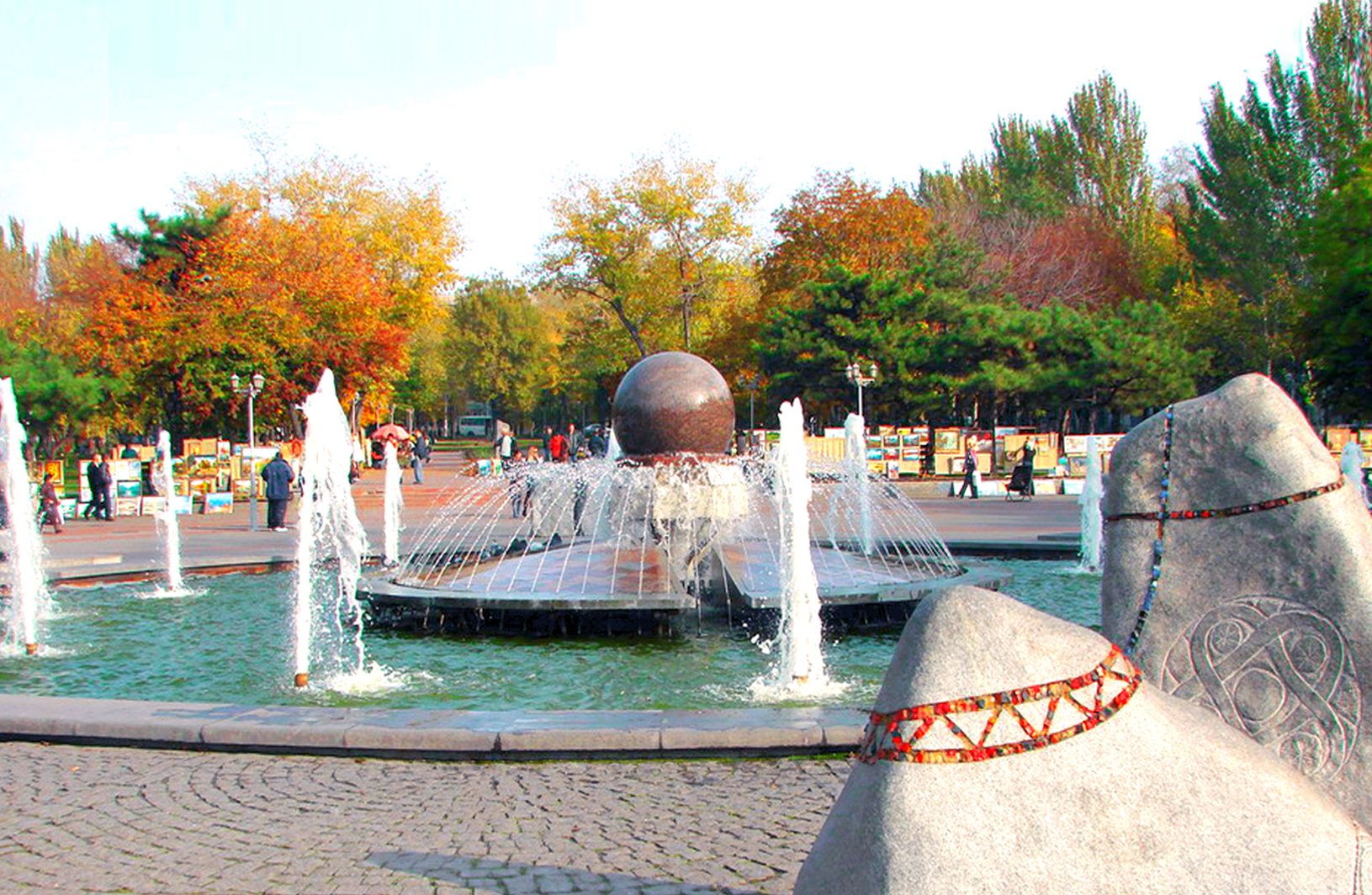
'Fountain of Life' in Zaporizhzhia (built in 2004) with the daily exhibition of Zaporizhzhian artists.

The historical and cultural museum "Zaporizka Sich" is placed on the northern rocky part of Khotritsa Island. The museum is a reconstruction of the stronghold of the Zaporizhzhian Cossacks, and contains features of the military camp life and their lifestyle.

Each of the smaller islands between the dam and the island Khortytsia has its own legend. On one of them, Durnya Scala ("Rock of the Fool"), Tzar Peter the Great flogged the Cossacks for their betrayal of the Russians during the Great Northern War between Russia and Sweden. Another small island, Stolb ("Pillar"), has a geological feature, which looks like a large bowl in granite slabs, the Cossack's Bowl. It is said that in summer days, water can be boiled in this "bowl", and the Cossacks used it for cooking galushki (boiled dough in a spicy broth).

== Transport links ==
Zaporizhzhia International Airport in 2019

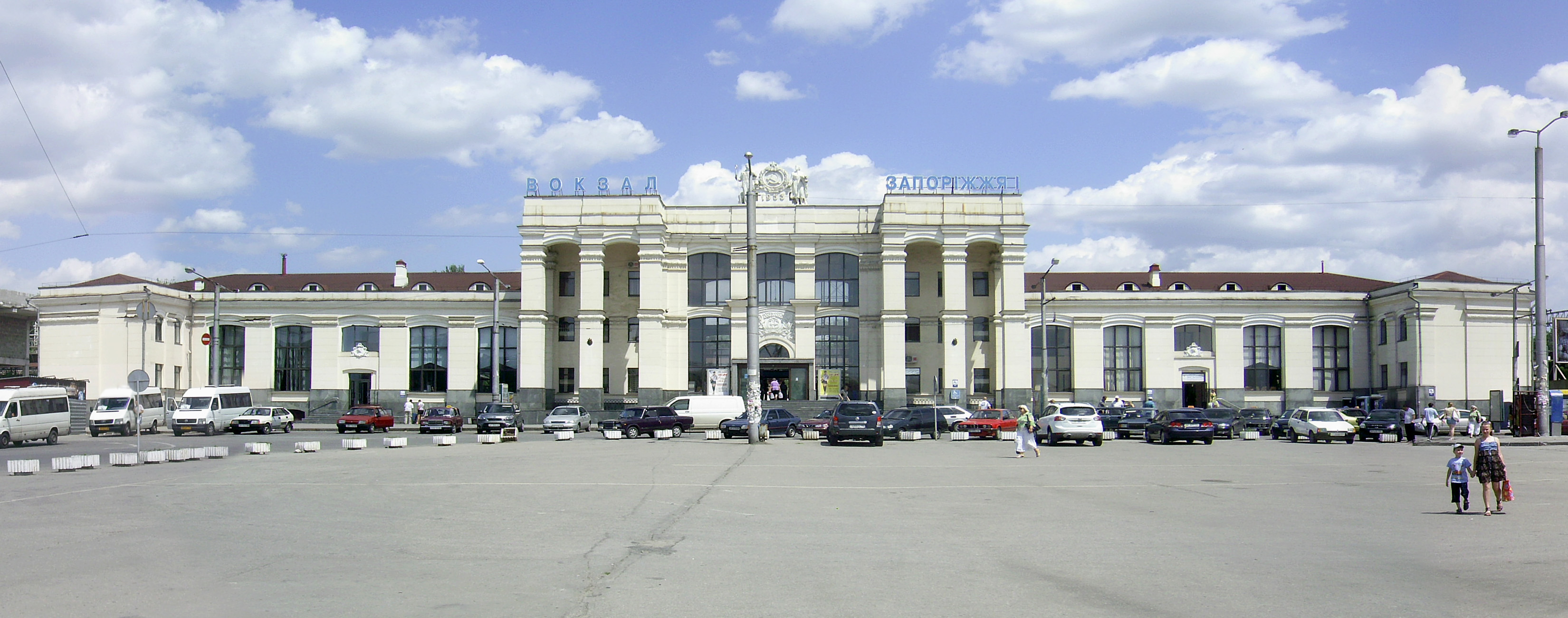
Zaporizhzhia-1 railway station

Zaporizhzhia is an important transportation hub in Ukraine that includes roads, as well as rail, river and air links for passenger and freight transport. Zaporizhzhia International Airport, located to the east of the city on the left-bank of the Dnieper, serves domestic and international flights. Shyroke Airfield is to the west of the city on the right-bank of the Dnieper.

Zaporizhzhia is bypassed beyond its eastern outskirts by a major national highway M18, which connects Kharkiv with Simferopol. The H08, which starts just outside Kyiv and travels southeast along the Dnieper through Kremenchuk, Kamianske, Dnipro, passes through Zaporizhzhia on the way to Mariupol. The H15 from Donetsk and the H23 from Kropyvnytskyi via Kryvyi Rih, both end in Zaporizhzhia.

There are four road bridges and two rail bridges over the Dnieper, nearly all of which bridges cross Khortytsia Island. President Volodymyr Zelenskyy opened the first stage of the New Zaporizhzhia Dniper Bridge early in 2022.

The city has two rail stations, Zaporizhzhia-1 railway station and Zaporizhzhia-the-Second. The First is the central station, located in the southern part of the city and is a part of Simferopol-Kharkiv, the "north-south" transit route. The line of the Zaporizhzhia-the-Second station connects the Donbas coalfield with Kryvyi Rih. The city has an extensive tram network with 7 lines called the Zaporizhzhia Tram.

The city's two river ports are part of the national water transportation infrastructure that connects Kyiv to Kherson along the Dnieper. Freight ships and cutter boats travel between Zaporizhzhia and nearby villages. The island of Khortytsia splits the Dnieper into two; the main channel passes the island on its eastern side, with the Staryi Dnipro (Old Dnieper) flowing past the island on the western side.

== Sports ==
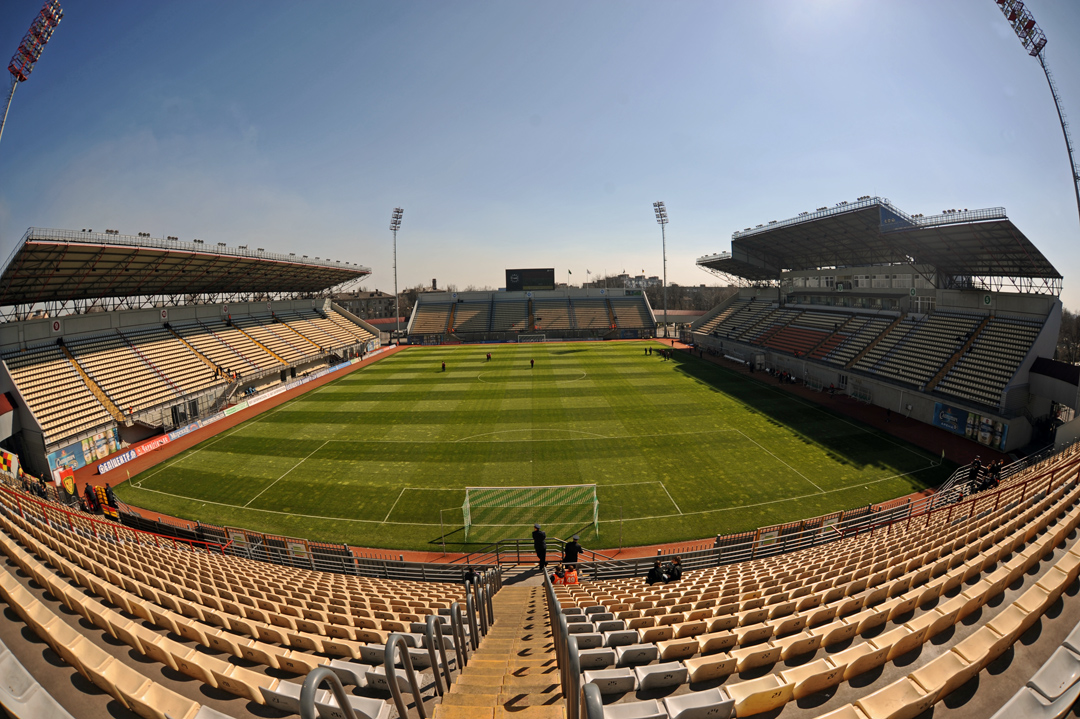
Slavutych-Arena

The main association football club of the city is FC Metalurh Zaporizhzhia, whose home ground is Slavutych-Arena.

The two most successful Ukrainian handball clubs both come from Zaporizhzhia: HC ZTR Zaporizhzhia and HC Motor Zaporizhzhia.

== Notable people ==
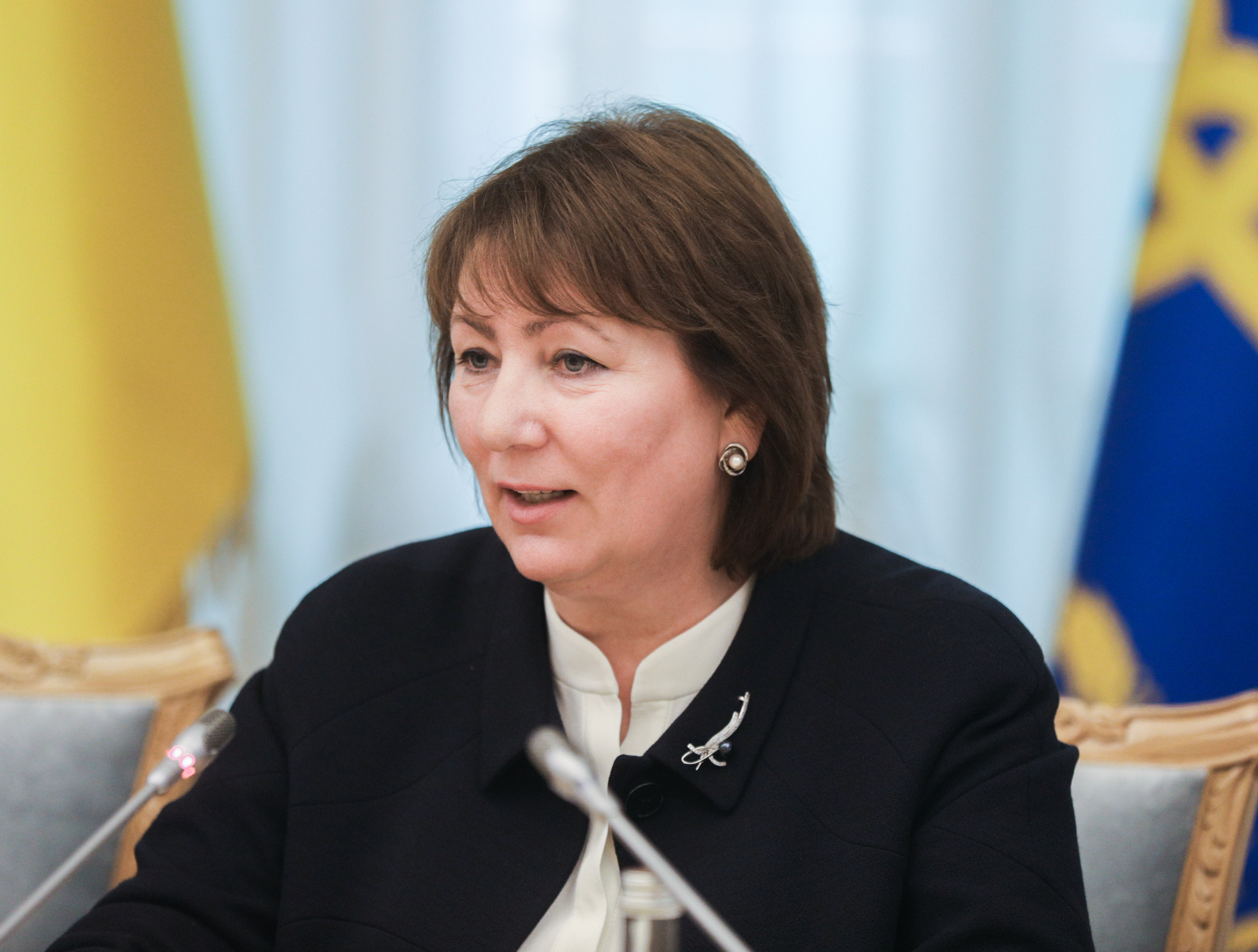
Valentyna Danishevska, 2019

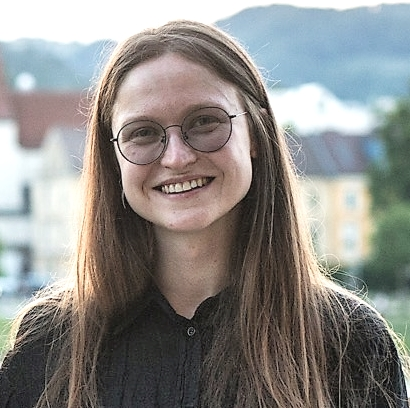
Alina Gorlova, 2021

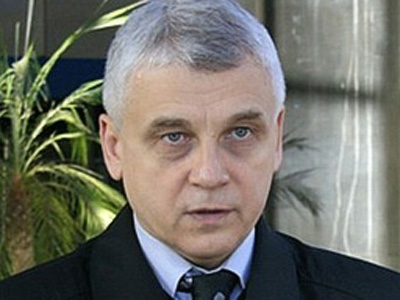
Valeriy Ivaschenko, 2015

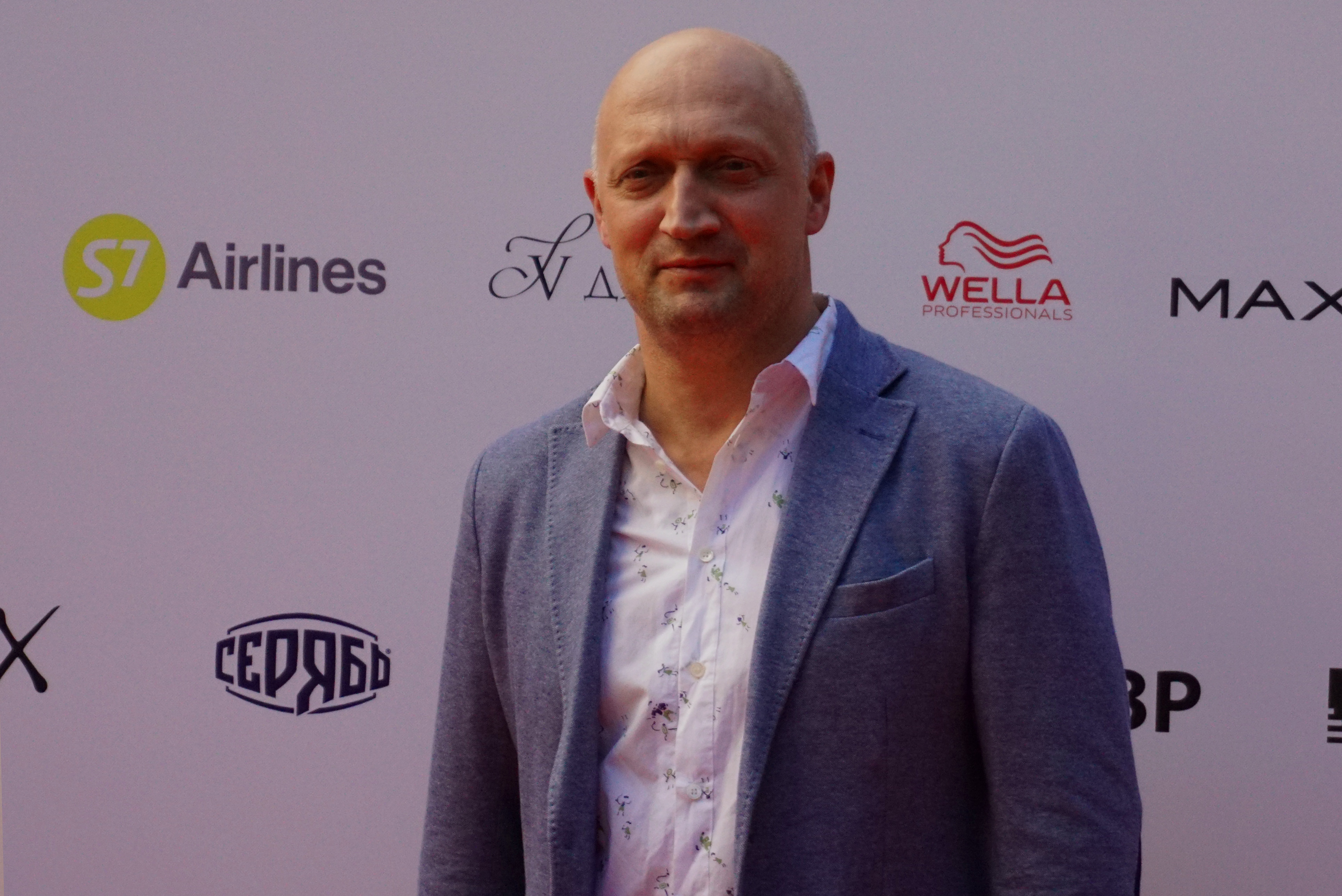
Gosha Kutsenko, 2016

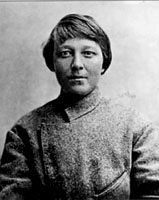
Maria Nikiforova, 1909

- Alyosha (born 1986), Ukrainian singer, stage name of Olena Oleksandrivna Kucher
- Anzhelika Bielova (born 1995), Ukrainian activist of Romani origin
- Vasiliy Bebko, (1932–2022), Russian diplomat
- Tamara Bulat (1933–2004), Ukrainian-American musicologist
- Victoria Bulitko (born 1983), a Ukrainian film, TV and theatre actress.
- Evgeniy Chernyak (born 1969), Ukrainian businessman
- Evgeniy Chuikov (1924–2000) Ukrainian landscape painter working in the Russian realist and French Impressionist traditions.
- Volodymyr Dakhno (1932–2006) Ukrainian animator and animation film director.
- Valentyna Danishevska (born 1957), Ukrainian lawyer and judge
- Gerhard Ens (1863–1952), farmer, immigration agent and politician in Saskatchewan
- Igor Fesunenko (1933–2016), Russian journalist and foreign affairs writer
- Arkady Gendler (1921–2017), Yiddish singer
- Sergey Glazyev (born 1961), Russian politician and economist
- Alina Gorlova (born 1992), a Ukrainian filmmaker, director, and screenwriter
- Konstantin Grigorishin (born 1965), a Russian-Ukrainian businessman and billionaire.
- Volodymyr Horbulin (born 1939), Ukrainian politician
- Valeriy Ivaschenko (born 1956), Ukrainian former Deputy Minister of Defence
- Boris Ivchenko, (1941–1990) Ukrainian actor and film director
- Igor P. Kaidashev (born 1969), Ukrainian immunologist and allergist
- Valeriy Kostyuk (born 1940), Russian scientist
- Maxim Ksenzov (born 1973), Russian statesman
- Valery Kulikov (born 1956), Ukrainian-born Russian politician
- Gosha Kutsenko (born 1967), Russian actor, producer, singer, poet and screenwriter
- Arsen Mirzoyan (born 1978), Ukrainian singer and songwriter
- Valentyn Nalyvaichenko (born 1966), Ukrainian diplomat and politician
- Eva Neymann (born 1974), Ukrainian film director
- Maria Nikiforova (1885–1919), revolutionary insurgent and anarchist partisan leader
- Anna October (born 1991), Ukrainian fashion designer
- Aleksandr Panayotov (born 1984), Russian-Ukrainian singer and songwriter
- Mykhailo Papiyev (born 1960), Ukrainian engineer and politician
- Oleksandr Peklushenko, (1954–2015) Ukrainian politician
- Max Polyakov (born 1977), an international technology entrepreneur, economist and philanthropist
- Georgy Shchokin (born 1954), businessman, sociologist, psychologist and politician
- Boris Shtein, (1892–1961) Soviet diplomat
- Oleksandr Sin (born 1961), Ukrainian politician former mayor of Zaporizhzhia
- Serhiy Sobolyev (born 1961), Ukrainian politician
- Yanina Sokolova (born 1984) a journalist, TV presenter and actress
- Naum Sorkin, (1899–1980) a Soviet military officer and diplomat
- Oleksandr Starukh (born 1973), Ukrainian historian and politician
- Liudmyla Suprun (born 1965), a Ukrainian politician
- Yevhen Synelnykov (born 1981), a Ukrainian TV presenter, director and actor
- Estas Tonne (born 1975), a musician, plays guitar and flute
- Vladyslav Yama (born 1982), a Ukrainian dancer and educator
- Maksym Ostapenko (born 1971), Ukrainian scientist, archaeologist, cultural activist, and a soldier
- Vlad Savchenko (born 1991), film producer and public activist
- Yurii Felipenko (1993–2025), actor killed whilst serving in the Russo-Ukrainian War

=== Sport ===
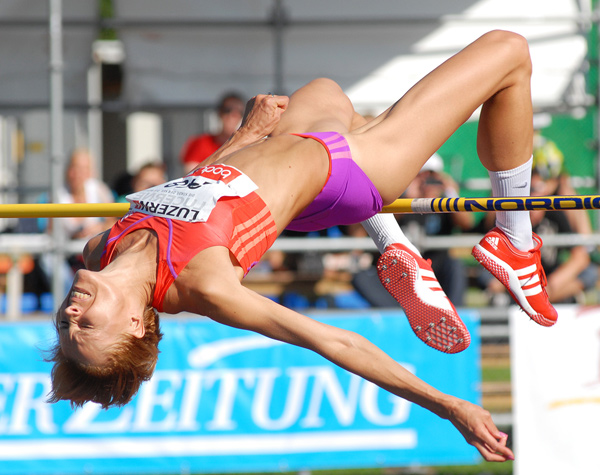
Vita Styopina, 2012

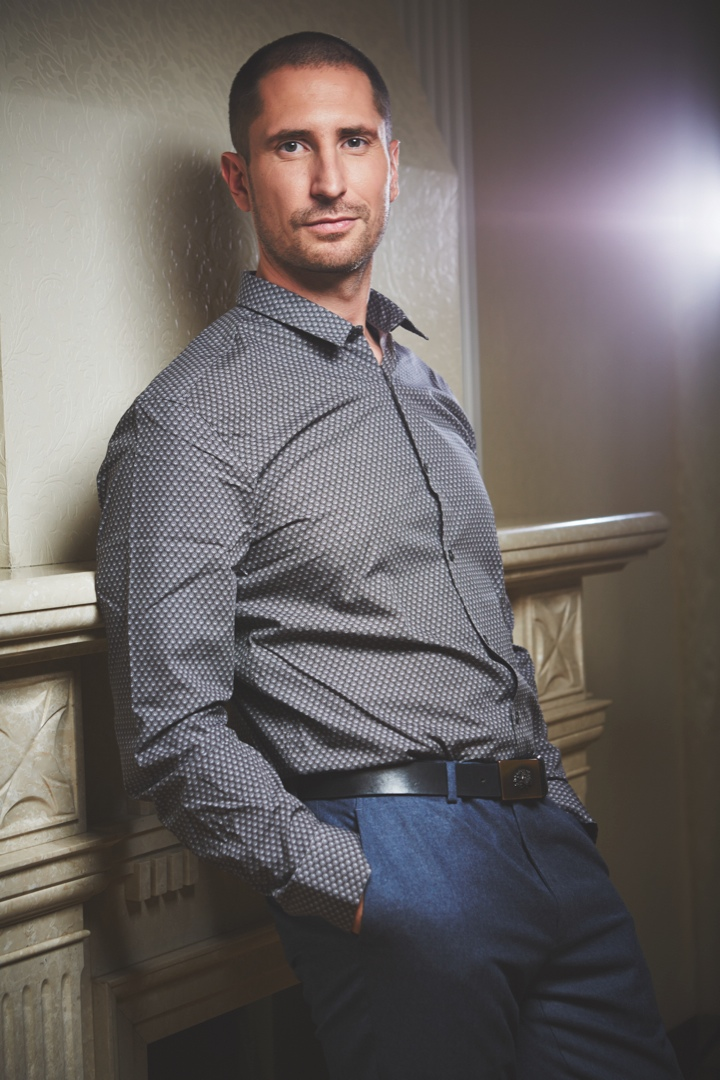
Denys Sylantyev, 2014

- Polina Astakhova (1936–2005) an artistic gymnast; won ten medals at the 1956, 1960 and 1964 Summer Olympics
- Anastasia Bliznyuk (born 1994), a Russian group rhythmic gymnast
- Maksym Dolhov (born 1996), Ukrainian diver
- Yan Kovalevskyi (born 1993), Ukrainian footballer
- Tanja Logwin (born 1974), Ukrainian-born Austrian handball player
- Alina Maksymenko (born 1991), Ukrainian rhythmic gymnast
- Oleksii Pashkov (born 1981), silver medallist in the discus at the 2012 Summer Paralympics
- Volodymyr Polikarpenko (born 1972), Ukrainian former trialthon athlete
- Yakiv Punkin (1921–1994) wrestler, gold medallist at the 1952 Summer Olympics
- Oksana Skaldina (born 1972) gymnast; bronze medallist at the 1992 Summer Olympics
- Ganna Sorokina (born 1976) diver; team bronze medallist at the 2000 Summer Olympics
- Olga Strazheva (born 1972) gymnast; team gold medallist at the 1988 Summer Olympics
- Vita Styopina (born 1976) high jumper; bronze medallist at the 2004 Summer Olympics
- Denys Sylantyev (born 1976) politician and swimmer; four time Olympian, silver medallist at the 2000 Summer Olympics and national flag bearer at the 2004 Summer Olympics
- Razmik Tonoyan (born 1988), Ukrainian sambist, (a Soviet-origin Russian martial art)
- Roman Volod'kov (born 1973), Ukrainian former diver
- Sergiusz Wołczaniecki (born 1964) a Polish weightlifter; bronze medallist at the 1992 Summer Olympics
- Oleksandr Zakhozhyi (born 1993), Ukrainian professional boxer
- Olena Zhupina (born 1973), Ukrainian diver
- Andrii Akimenko (born 1994), Ukrainian handball player

== In popular culture ==
Zaporizhzhia is a setting in two Axis victory in World War II short novels by the American author Harry Turtledove, Ready for the Fatherland (1991) and The Phantom Tolbukhin (1998).

== Twin towns – sister cities ==
Zaporizhzhia is twinned with:

- Lahti, Finland (1953)
- Belfort, France (1967)
- Birmingham, United Kingdom (1973)
- Linz, Austria (1983)
- Oberhausen, Germany (1986)
- Yichang, China (1997)
- Magdeburg, Germany (2008)
- Ashdod, Israel (2011)
- Steinbach, Canada (2018)

In 1969, the city renamed one of its streets after the city of Wrocław. The Wrocław authorities reciprocated, and a part of the Sudecka – Grabiszyńska Street towards the Square of the Silesian Insurgents was renamed Zaporoska Street.

== See also ==
- Zaporizhzhia Ferroalloy Plant
- Zaporizhzhia Foundry and Mechanical Plant
