= Zaporizhzhia Regional Universal Scientific Library =

Library in Zaporizhzhia, Ukraine

Coordinates: 47.8261°N 35.1667°E

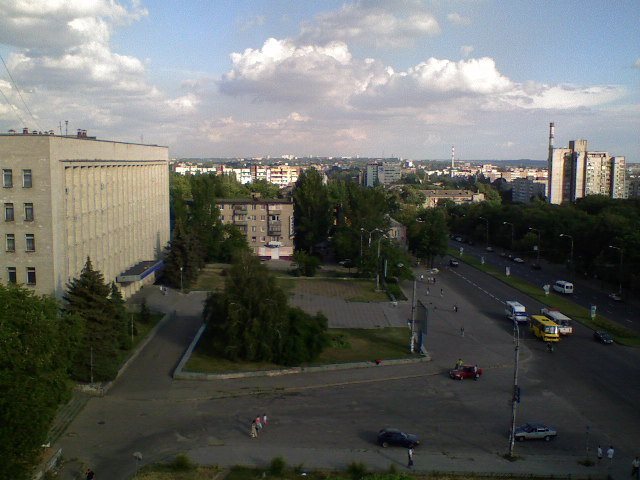
- Location: Zaporizhzhia, Ukraine
- Established: 22 January 1904

Collection
- Size: 1 500 000 units

Access and use
- Circulation: 1 100 000 units
- Population served: 40 000 every year

Other information
- Director: Stepanenko Inna Pavlovna
- Employees: 144
- Website: http://www.zounb.zp.ua

Zaporizhzhia Regional Universal Scientific Library (Ukrainian: Запорізька обласна універсальна наукова бібліотека, romanized: Zaporizka oblasna universalna naukova biblioteka) is one of the leading libraries in the Zaporizhzhia Oblast (region). The library was founded in January 1904. Its fund is 1 million 484 thousand units. The total area of library depository - 4700 square meters. Number of places for users - 800.

== History ==
The history of Zaporizhzhia Regional Universal Scientific Library begins in January 1904 with the adoption of the Charter of the Alexander City Public Library of Ekaterinoslav province, and the first user of newly formed library was adopted on 15 January 1905. History of the library at all stages of its development is closely linked with the main stages of social and political life of the country:

- 1939 – library was transformed into regional;
- 1941 - during the Nazi occupation library was burned;
- 1943 - immediately after the liberation of the city began restoration of the book fund;
- 1977 - the construction of new building was finished and the transition to the modern Palace of the book was made.

Now Zaporizhzhia Regional Universal Scientific Library - is an information and cultural-educational complex, the center of intellectual development of the oblast.

== Administration ==
- Director: Stepanenko, Inna Pavlovna, Honored Worker of Culture of Ukraine
- Deputy directors
  - On interlibrary work: Kupreeva Natalya Anatolyevna
  - On science and information: Izyumova Lyudmila Fedorovna
  - On economic work: Zhavoronkov Gennady Eugenievich

== Structure ==
- Department of user registration, statistics and monitoring performs users recording, acquaints users with the rules of library use, its structure and mode of operation. For services to parents with children - children's room.
- Information-bibliographic department helps users to find literature through directories and files, creates thematic inquiries and provides information on the availability of documents in library's collections, including the virtual bibliographer, establish list "Zaporizhzhia on the pages of the central press".
- Library loan, gives users literature for home use, visitors have opportunity of self-selection documents in public domain.
- Internet center created with the assistance of the U.S. Embassy in Ukraine. Users service is provided under the pre-registration records, and according to established rules of the Internet center.
- Sector of rare and valuable documents contains a collection of rare books and periodicals, amounting to over than 10 thousand copies. The oldest document - "Edicts of Catherine the Great" (1764), there is a facsimile edition of "Юности честное зерцало или Показание к житейскомy обхождению" (1717 г.), first editions of famous writers of XIX - early twentieth centuries, natural history, documents, books with autographs, giant books, tiny books, unusual gift editions. Staff working on compiling bibliographies separate section of the collection of valuable and rare documents.
- Department of Technical and Economical Literature priority is industrial production professionals and professionals in management areas of business and entrepreneurship service. Widely represented literature on economic, financial, banking, marketing, IT-technologies. Here you can find club of inventors.
- Reading room of documents in the humanities offersing a complex literature humanities from auxiliary funds and core libraries. The components of the department are the Canadian-Ukrainian Library Center, an exhibition hall, conference hall.
- Department of interlibrary loan: If the necessary book is not represented in the collections of our library, department staff will request and obtain the necessary documents by mail from other libraries of Ukraine and abroad. Enterprises and organizations of the city are served by the interlibrary loan by the paid contract. It employs electronic document delivery service.
- Department of Agriculture and the natural science literature offers users publications of natural history, ecology, resource management, mathematical sciences, physics, chemistry, geography, medicine, agriculture. Here landscape club is represented.
- Department of documents in foreign languages serves users by books and periodicals of the near and far abroad. Assists in solving training in foreign languages means a diversified library collection, in particular, handbooks, manuals, electronic media. Here is represented an oblast resource center for teachers of English.
- Department of documents of art has a great fund of music and musical literature, art literature, criticism, which contains more than 15 thousand copies and is constantly updated with new books, documents on non-traditional media. The department has its own reference search engine, creates scenarios. It has exposition hall, where are represented products of national applied art, paintings of amateur and professional artists, music room with modern multimedia equipment.
- Sector of periodicals and new acquisitions literature gets information sources, periodicals from Ukraine, Russia and CIS countries (over 1000 titles of newspapers, magazines). In the hall of the new acquisitions users can read new literature.
- Division of Local History collects publications on the history and modern development of Zaporizhzhia Oblast, receives the legal deposit of local publications, organizing services users with reference and bibliographic apparatus of local history of literature. Engage in publishing activities of the oblast ("Streets of Zaporizhzhia - the mirror of history", a series of pointers bibliography – "Researchers of Homeland", "Writers of native land", "Heroes of Ukraine - our countrymen", yearbook "Remarkable and memorable dates of Zaporizhzhia and others").
- Other departments:

- Department of forming Document Collections
- Department of document processing and organization of catalogs
- Scientific-methodic department
- Automatisation and information Department
- Industrial Department
- Instructor of personnel

== Format of Zaporizhzhia Regional Universal Scientific Library ==
- 195 000 visitors annually use library services
- 1 100 000 publications - general distribution of literature
- 1 500 000 units - library fund
- 10 000 - valuable and rare editions
- 20 000 - annual income of new literature
- 1100 titles of newspapers, magazines
- 27 fixed locations of Internet access, Wi-Fi zones
- 150 book fairs every year

Average attendance at one reader a year - 7 times.

The average number of publications read by one user per year - 46 ind.

Average attendance at the library every day - 722.

Average distribution of literature every day - 3680 copies.
