= Pilipenko =

Pilipenko or Pylypenko (Ukrainian: Пилипе́нко) is a Ukrainian patronymic surname derived from the given name Pylyp, or Philip. Notable people with the surname include:

- Anastassiya Pilipenko (born 1986), Kazakhstani hurdler
- Anna Pilipenko (born 1988), Belarusian footballer
- Olga Pilipenko (born 1966), Russian politician
- Roman Pilipenko (born 1987), Kazakh water polo player
- Viktor Pylypenko (born 2000), Ukrainian footballer

== See also ==
- Filipenko
- Filippenko
