= Kolorit =

Zaporizhzhia city association of artists "Kolorit"
- Formation: 1994
- Region served: Zaporizhzhia city, Ukraine
- Leadership: Natalia Babenko
- Website: Official website of «Kolorit», Page of «Kolorit» on Facebook (in Ukrainian)

Zaporizhzhia city association of artists "Kolorit" (Ukrainian: Запорізьке міське об'єднання митців "Колорит") – is a democratic creative organization in Zaporizhzhia, Ukraine, the members of which are as professional artists, designers, cartoonists, members of the Union of Artists of Ukraine, national Union of Masters of Ukraine, and also those whose talent opened up and develops with arrival in association "Kolorit".

== About the organization ==
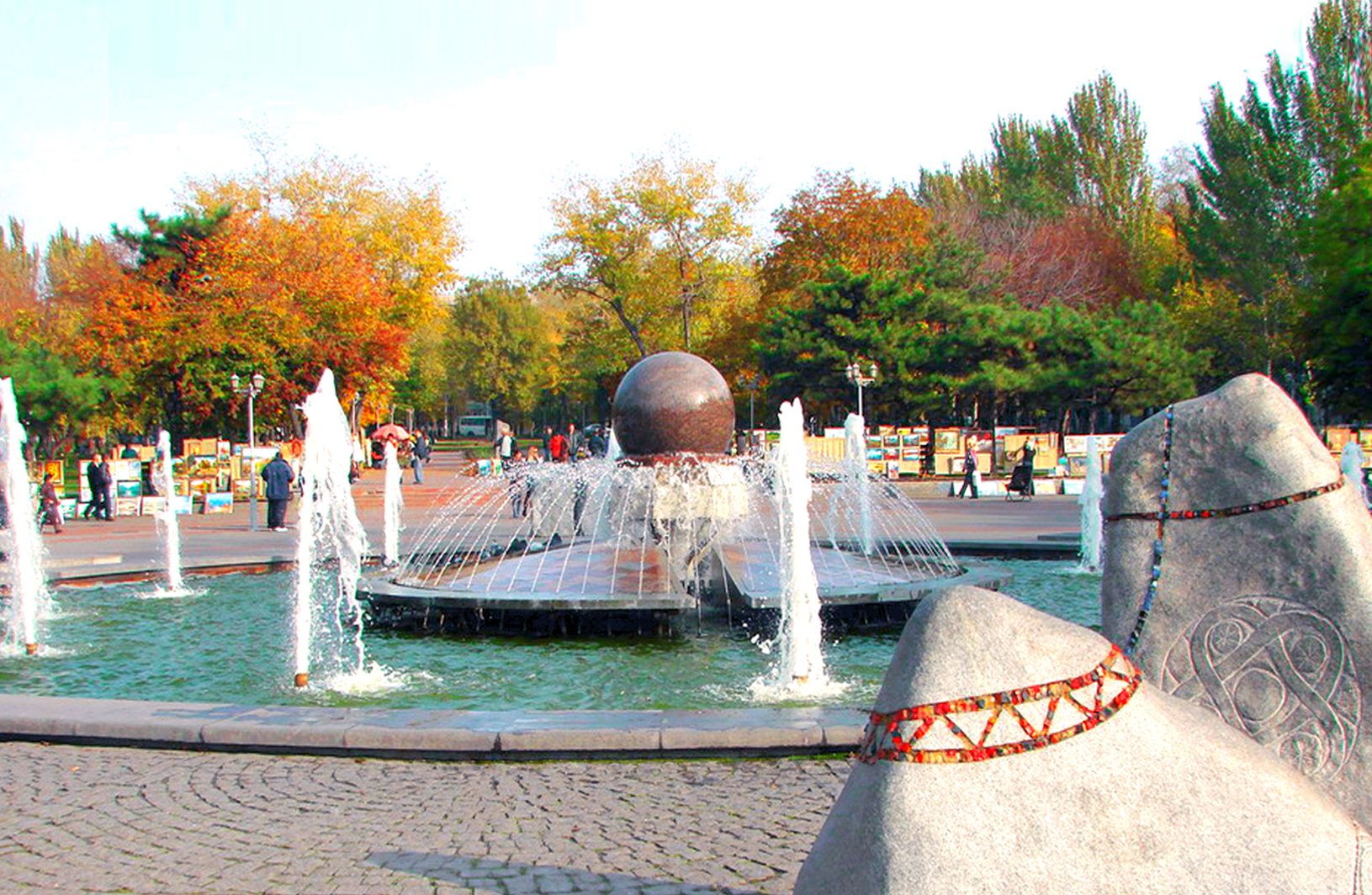
Exhibitions of Zaporizhzhia city association of artists "Kolorit" near Fountain of Life at Square of Мayakovskoho in the center of city.

Zaporizhzhia city association of artists "Kolorit" unites artists who live and work in Zaporizhzhia – both professionals and amateurs, that have not obtained artistic education, but proved the talent in practice. Daily exhibition of largest artists' organization in the city is the unique place in Zaporizhzhia, where citizens and guests of the city can chat with craftsmen and artists, see workshops of carving, embroidery, beading and other creative work, get tips from artists, designers, cartoonists, as professionals, as well whose talent was revealed and developed with the arrival to this organization.

In the moment of creation in 1994 "Kolorit" numbered 14 people. Today the organization includes 160 members from 22 to 92 years which represent various genres, techniques and directions. It allows to talk about "Kolorit" as the largest creative organization of Zaporozhia, whose masters and artists are well known to the townspeople due to the creation, participation in eleemosynary actions, surveys in television shows and publications in city Mass-medias.
