= Yan Kovalevskyi =

Ukrainian footballer

Personal information
- Full name: Yan Anatoliyovych Kovalevskyi
- Date of birth: 26 June 1993 (age 33)
- Place of birth: Zaporizhia, Ukraine
- Height: 1.80 m (5 ft 11 in)
- Position: Striker

Team information
- Current team: FC Hirnyk-Sport Komsomolsk
- Number: 11

Youth career
- 2006–2009: FC Metalurh Zaporizhzhia

Senior career*
Years	Team	Apps	(Gls)
2009–2015	FC Metalurh Zaporizhzhia	9	(1)
2009–2012	→FC Metalurh-2 Zaporizhzhia	39	(4)
2016–	FC Hirnyk-Sport Komsomolsk	2	(0)

International career^{‡}
2009	Ukraine-17	1	(0)
2010	Ukraine-18	2	(0)
2010	Ukraine-19	1	(0)
- * Club domestic league appearances and goals as of 4 April 2016 ‡ National team caps and goals as of 4 April 2016

Yan Kovalevskyi (Ukrainian: Ян Анатолійович Ковалевський; born 26 June 1993 in Zaporizhia, Ukraine) is a Ukrainian football striker. He is currently playing for Ukrainian side FC Hirnyk-Sport Komsomolsk.

Kovalevskyi is product of youth team system FC Metalurh Zaporizhzhia. Made his debut for FC Metalurh entering as a second half-time substitution playing against FC Sevastopol on 15 May 2011 in Ukrainian Premier League.
