= Maksym Ostapenko =

Ukrainian scientist (born 1971)

- Максим Остапенко
- Born: Maksym Anatoliiovych Ostapenko; 4 August 1971 (age 55); Zaporizhzhia, Ukrainian SSR, Soviet Union
- Education: Zaporizhzhia National University
- Occupation: Archaeologist
- Awards: Order of Merit

Maksym Anatoliiovych Ostapenko (Ukrainian: Ігор Анатолійович Остапенко, born on 4 August 1971 in Zaporizhzhia) is a Ukrainian scientist, archaeologist, cultural activist, and a soldier of the Armed Forces of Ukraine. He is also a Candidate of Historical Sciences (2013) and Member of the National Union of Local History of Ukraine.

== Biography ==
Ostapenko graduated from Zaporizhzhia National University with a major in history. Since 1989, he has worked as a forester at the Nature Protection Department, working as a junior, senior and leading researcher at the Department of Historical and Cultural Monuments Protection. He was also the head of the museum department, deputy director for research (2005–2007), and director general (2007–2022) of the Khortytsia National Reserve.

During his tenure, he discovered the following: a Scythian settlement in Sovutynia Gully, a Bronze Age sanctuary on Braharnia Hill, Bronze Age religious buildings in the Molodniaha Gully area, and underwater archaeological sites found in the Old Dnipro Riverbed: "Zaporozka Chaika", brigantine. He was the curator of the construction of the historical and cultural complex Zaporizka Sich.

In 2012, he was elected chairman of the Zaporizhzhia Oblast Organization of the National Union of Local History of Ukraine. After the start of the full-scale Russian invasion, he joined the Armed Forces of Ukraine.

Currently at the Kyiv-Pechersk Lavra National Conservation Area as Acting Director General (from 14 April to 28 October 2023), and later Director General (from 28 October 2023). On May 21, 2025, Ostapenko was dismissed from his position as director general of the Kyiv-Pechersk Lavra Reserve by order of the Ministry of Culture. According to Ostapenko, the decision was made without explanations, warnings, or comments regarding his work. After his dismissal, the Ministry of Culture stated that Ostapenko had a "weak position," and his position was taken by Svitlana Kotlyarevska, his deputy. In January 2026, the Ministry of Culture and Strategic Communications of Ukraine reinstated Ostapenko as Director.

He is the author of more than 30 scientific publications.

== Awards ==
- Order of Merit, 3rd class (23 August 2011)
