= Dniprovskyi District, Zaporizhzhia =

City district of Zaporizhzhia, Ukraine

Dniprovskyi District Дніпровський район
- Urban district
- Administrative map of Zaporizhzhia; the Dniprovskyi District is indicated by the number 4.

- Location within Zaporizhzhia Oblast
- Coordinates: 47°52′44″N 35°03′50″E
- Country: Ukraine
- Municipality: Zaporizhzhia Municipality
- Established: 16 March 1928

Area
  - Total: 49.7 km^{2} (19.2 sq mi)

Population (2001)
  - Total: 151,900
  - Density: 3,060/km^{2} (7,920/sq mi)
- Time zone: UTC+2 (EET)
  - Summer (DST): UTC+3 (EEST)

The Dniprovskyi District (Ukrainian: Дніпровський район, Dniprovsʹkyi raion) is one of seven administrative urban districts (raions) of the city of Zaporizhzhia, located in southern Ukraine. Its population was 151,900 in the 2001 Ukrainian Census.

== Geography ==
The third smallest of Zaporizhzhia's seven urban districts, the district has an area of 49.7 square kilometres (19.2 mi^{2}), making up approximately 14.88% of the total administrative area of Zaporizhzhia. The district is located mostly on the right (west) side of the Dnieper river, with a small area of land on the left side of the river. It is one of only two districts with territory to the west of the Dnieper.

== History ==
The district was founded in 1928 as Leninskya district. Following the passage of decommunization laws, in 2016, the district, along with numerous streets, were renamed to their current names. Some of the new street names adopted within the district include Boris Grinchenko St., Oleksandr Kuznetsov St, Sergeant Medvedev St., Gerhard Rempel St., Olga Kobylyanska St., Mykhailo Hrushevskyi St., Olena Teliga St., and Rosenthal St..
