= Oleksandrivskyi District, Zaporizhzhia =

City district of Zaporizhzhia, Ukraine

Oleksandrivskyi District Олександрівський район
- Urban district
- Administrative map of Zaporizhzhia; the Oleksandrivskyi District is indicated by the number 1.

- Location within Zaporizhzhia Oblast
- Coordinates: 47°49′30″N 35°10′00″E
- Country: Ukraine
- Municipality: Zaporizhzhia Municipality
- Established: 2 September 1935

Area
  - Total: 11.2 km^{2} (4.3 sq mi)

Population (2001)
  - Total: 76,300
  - Density: 6,810/km^{2} (17,600/sq mi)
- Time zone: UTC+2 (EET)
  - Summer (DST): UTC+3 (EEST)

The Oleksandrivskyi District (Ukrainian: Олександрівський район, Oleksandrivsʹkyi raion) is one of seven administrative urban districts (raions) of the city of Zaporizhzhia, located in southern Ukraine. Its population was 76,300 in the 2001 Ukrainian Census.

== Geography ==
The smallest of Zaporizhzhia's seven urban districts, the district has an area of 11.2 square kilometres (4.3 mi^{2}), making up approximately 3.35% of the total administrative area of Zaporizhzhia. The district is located fully on the left (east) side of the Dnieper river.

== History ==
The district was founded in 1935 as Zhovtnevya district. Following the passage of decommunization laws, in 2016, the district, along with numerous streets, were renamed to their current names. Some of the new street names adopted within the district include Pavel Zakharin St., Malinova St., Zoryana St., Pryhodska St., Akademik Amosov St., Akademik Chabanenko St, Bazarna St, and Dniprovska St..
