= Pylypchuk =

Surname list

Pylypchuk is a Ukrainian patronymic surname from the masculine given name Pylyp (Ukrainian: Пилип) (cognate to Philip). It is spelled Pilipchuk, if transliterated from Russian. Notable people with the surname include:

- Jon Pylypchuk (born in 1972), Canadian sculptor and painter
- Roman Pylypchuk (born in 1967), Ukrainian football player and coach
- Serhiy Pylypchuk (born in 1984), Ukrainian football player
- Sviatlana Tsikhanouskaya né Pilipchuk, Belarusian opposition leader
- Volodymyr Pylypchuk (1948–2025), Ukrainian politician

== See also ==
- Filipchuk
