= Filipchuk =

Filipchuk is an East Slavic patronymic surname derived from the masculine given name Filip (cognate to Philip). Polish-language version: Filipczuk. Notable people with the surname include:

- Heorhiy Filipchuk (uk), Ukrainian politician
- Pavlo Filipchuk, Ukrainian businessman and pro-Russian politician
- Vasyl Filipchuk, Ukrainian diplomat and politician

== See also ==
- Pylypchuk
- Filipchenko
