= Yurii Felipenko =

Ukrainian actor (1993–2025)

- Юрій Феліпенко
- Born: Yuriy Serhiyovych Felipenko; 8 May 1993; Zaporizhzhia, Ukraine
- Died: 15 June 2025 (aged 32)
- Cause of death: Killed during the Russo-Ukrainian War
- Education: Kyiv National I. K. Karpenko-Kary Theatre, Cinema and Television University
- Occupation: Actor
- Years active: 2014–2025
- Spouse: Kateryna Motrych

Yuriy Serhiyovych Felipenko (Ukrainian: Юрій Сергійович Феліпенко; 8 May 1993 – 15 June 2025) was a Ukrainian theatre and film actor.

== Life and career ==
Felipenko was born on 8 May 1993 in Zaporizhzhia, and graduated from the Kyiv National University of Theater, Film and Television in 2016. He was an actor at the Kyiv Academic Drama Theater in Podil.

In 2014, he made his television debut in Season 9 of the Russian detective series Muhtar's Return. He also appeared in Unit 44 and The Color of Passion.

In 2019, he was awarded the Kyiv Art Award.

In April 2024, Felipenko joined the Armed Forces of Ukraine as part of the Achilles UAV of the 92nd Assault Brigade and served in the Russo-Ukrainian War. He was killed in action on 15 June 2025, at the age of 32 at the Pokrovsk front.
