= Ivan Fedorov (politician) =

Ukrainian politician (born 1988)

- Іван Федоров
- Fedorov in 2022

Head of the State Agency for Restoration and Infrastructure Development of Ukraine
- Incumbent
- Assumed office September 2026
- Prime Minister: Serhii Koretskyi
- Preceded by: Serhii Sukhomlyn

Head of the Zaporizhzhia Oblast State Administration
- In office 2 February 2024 – 4 September 2026
- President: Volodymyr Zelenskyy
- Prime Minister: Denys Shmyhal; Yulia Svyrydenko; Serhii Koretskyi
- Preceded by: Yuriy Malashko
- Succeeded by: Mykhailo Semikin (acting)

Mayor of Melitopol
- In office 7 December 2020 – 4 September 2026
- Preceded by: Serhii Minko
- Succeeded by: Iryna Rudakova (acting)

Personal details
- Born: 29 August 1988 (age 38) Melitopol, Ukrainian SSR, Soviet Union

Ivan Serhiiovych Fedorov (Ukrainian: Іван Сергійович Федоров; born 29 August 1988) is a Ukrainian politician who has headed the State Agency for Restoration and Infrastructure Development of Ukraine since September 2026. He headed the Zaporizhzhia Oblast State Administration from February 2024 to September 2026 and served as mayor of Melitopol from 2020 to 2026. He began his political career on the Melitopol City Council, to which he was elected in 2010 as a member of the Party of Regions.

After Russian forces occupied Melitopol in 2022 during the Russian invasion of Ukraine, they abducted Fedorov. Ukraine secured his release in exchange for nine captured Russian soldiers. During his tenure in Zaporizhzhia Oblast, investigations by Bihus.Info, Suspilne, Nashi Hroshi and regional outlets examined public procurement and reported links between contractors and people associated with Fedorov.

== Early life and education ==
Fedorov was born in Melitopol on 29 August 1988 to a family of physicians. His father was an ear, nose and throat specialist, and his mother headed a department at a maternity hospital. His brother Oleksandr, also an ear, nose and throat specialist, served on the Zaporizhzhia City Council.

He studied management at the Kyiv Polytechnic Institute from 2007 to 2012, earning a bachelor's degree. From 2010 to 2011, he studied at Tavria State Agrotechnological University in Melitopol, where he earned a master's degree in enterprise economics. From 2012 to 2015, he studied at the Dnipropetrovsk Regional Institute of Public Administration, where he earned a master's degree in public administration with a specialisation in public administration and local self-government.

== Political career ==
=== Party of Regions and local government ===
In 2010, Fedorov was elected to the sixth convocation of the Melitopol City Council as a member of the pro-Russian Party of Regions. He served on the council until 2015. Fedorov said that the mayor at the time, Dmytro Sychov, who knew his father, had invited him to run. Fedorov served on the council's standing committee on land and municipal property.

On 14 July 2014, RIA Melitopol reported that Fedorov had announced at a press conference that he had submitted a request to leave the Party of Regions. He said that he had taken up a public office and believed that public officials should have no party affiliation. The outlet reported that the local party branch was unaware of his request.

In a 2016 interview, Fedorov contrasted the Party of Regions' slogans with its actions. He attributed his decision to run for the Petro Poroshenko Bloc in 2015 to working with a team and cooperating with the presidential administration. In 2023, he said he had chosen the Party of Regions in 2010 because it dominated Melitopol politics and he wanted to take part in council decisions.

From May 2014 to August 2019, Fedorov was deputy mayor of Melitopol with responsibility for the council's executive bodies. In 2015, he was elected to the Zaporizhzhia Oblast Council, where he served on the standing budget committee. He headed the Department of Transport Infrastructure of the Kyiv City State Administration from August to October 2019 and was first deputy head of the Zaporizhzhia Oblast State Administration from November 2019 to November 2020.

=== Mayor of Melitopol ===
In the 2020 mayoral election, Fedorov ran for the Serhii Minko Team party. Results released on 3 November showed that he had won 59.6 per cent of the vote (21,023 votes). He took office on 7 December at the first session of the newly elected city council.

Russian forces occupied Melitopol in the opening days of the full-scale invasion of Ukraine in 2022. Ukrainian officials said Fedorov had refused to cooperate with the occupying forces, which abducted him on 11 March. The following day, around 2,000 residents demonstrated to demand his release. On 16 March, Ukraine secured his release in exchange for nine captured Russian conscripts.

In September 2026, following Fedorov's move to the Restoration Agency, the Melitopol City Council voted to accept his resignation and assigned the duties of mayor to council secretary Iryna Rudakova.

=== Zaporizhzhia Oblast and the Restoration Agency ===
President Volodymyr Zelenskyy appointed Fedorov head of the Zaporizhzhia Oblast State Administration on 2 February 2024. He also headed the oblast's wartime military administration.

On 2 September 2026, Fedorov presented a report on his tenure. He said that the oblast had established a defence fund that had directed more than UAH 8.5 billion to support Ukraine's defence forces, undertaken projects to protect energy infrastructure and begun building underground schools and kindergartens. He also reported reconstruction and modernisation work at healthcare facilities.

The Cabinet of Ministers issued an order appointing Fedorov head of the State Agency for Restoration and Infrastructure Development of Ukraine on 3 September 2026. The order specified that the appointment would take effect when Fedorov began performing his duties. The appointment was announced on 4 September, when Zelenskyy dismissed him as head of the oblast state administration and appointed Mykhailo Semikin as acting head.

== Investigative reporting ==
=== Fortification construction ===
In August 2025, Bihus.Info investigated procurement for fortifications in Zaporizhzhia Oblast. According to the Zaporizhzhia Investigation Centre's account of the findings, the contractors Akvi-Bud and Melsiti bought materials from Fundament-L, a company owned by former Melitopol city councillor Serhii Bilovol. The reporting examined possible overpricing and family ties among parties involved in the procurement. Fedorov acknowledged knowing Bilovol but denied that the relationship had influenced the award of contracts. He said that local companies had been approached because they had the resources needed for the work.

In a public response on 15 August, Fedorov said that seven companies willing to work near the front had built the fortifications, with oversight from law enforcement and a temporary investigative commission of the Verkhovna Rada. He attributed some of the costs to logistics and said that the administration was prepared to cooperate with inspections.

=== Kalmius contracts ===
In May 2025, Nashi Hroshi reported that the state enterprise Local Roads of Zaporizhzhia Oblast had awarded three contracts totalling 658.82 million hryvnias (UAH) to the recently established company Kalmius. The contracts covered a building at the regional children's hospital and shelters for two schools. Comparing the budgeted cost of reinforcing steel with suppliers' prices, the outlet estimated a possible overpayment of more than UAH 6 million for the steel.

In December 2025, the Zaporizhzhia Investigation Centre reported that Ukraine's State Audit Service had raised concerns about the procurement, including the origin of materials for projects financed through the Ukraine Facility. According to the outlet, a court overturned the audit findings on the two shelters after the contracts were amended to replace the materials in question. The dispute over the hospital building was ongoing at the time of publication. The contracting authority told the outlet that Kalmius had provided the documentation required to verify its workers' qualifications.

On 28 September 2026, Nashi Hroshi reported that Kalmius had received contracts worth a cumulative UAH 5.6 billion through Prozorro, including UAH 2.14 billion after Fedorov's appointment to the Restoration Agency. The new contracts included roughly UAH 1.1 billion for anti-drone protection on roads in Zaporizhzhia Oblast and work to protect two energy facilities in Dnipropetrovsk Oblast. The outlet found that some unit prices in the Zaporizhzhia road contract exceeded those in a Kharkiv contract. Prices for installing posts and netting were about three times as high, and prices for guy wires about one and a half times as high. The outlet linked Kalmius to Fedorov's Melitopol associates through its work with Kompaniia Pozytyv and its rental of equipment from Morena SK.

=== Underground schools and kindergartens ===
In 2026, Suspilne examined procurement worth more than UAH 1 billion for four underground schools and four kindergartens in Zaporizhzhia. It reported links among three contractors, limited competition and possible overpayments for materials. Fedorov told Suspilne that he was neither a beneficiary nor a business partner of Melsiti, Kompaniia Pozytyv or Kalmius and had no business dealings with their management. He said that contractors were selected by the contracting authorities responsible for the projects, rather than by the oblast military administration.

=== Family medical business ===
In July 2025, SODA reported that the Zaporizhzhia Regional Clinical Hospital had purchased services from the Centre for Computed Tomography, a company owned by Fedorov's parents. The outlet questioned why the hospital had commissioned services when it had its own CT scanners. The hospital said that one of its scanners had broken down and that it no longer needed additional services by the time it replied.

In April 2026, SODA reported that Scan-Medservice had leased 58.7 square metres (632 sq ft) of hospital space and subsequently sublet it to the company owned by Fedorov's parents. The outlet reported that Fedorov signed the orders authorising the lease and setting its terms, and that his deputy Ruslan Movchan approved the sublease. SODA noted that the stated sublease rent was lower than the rent under the main lease. The oblast military administration told SODA that it saw no evidence of a conflict of interest. A lawyer from the Anti-Corruption Action Centre told the outlet that establishing an offence would require evidence beyond the circumstances described.

== Disputes with Zaporizhzhia city officials ==
=== Anatolii Kurtiev ===
On 24 April 2024, Zaporizhzhia City Council secretary Anatolii Kurtiev appealed to the president of Ukraine, accusing Fedorov of pressuring local government and trying to remove him from office. That day, the council removed Kurtiev and elected Rehina Kharchenko as its secretary. Fedorov supported the decision, saying it would allow the council to resume its work and improve coordination between the city and the oblast. He said that he had spoken to councillors and invited Kurtiev to meet, but denied pressuring him.

=== Maksym Denshchyk ===
In May 2024, Maksym Denshchyk, head of the Zaporizhzhia City Council's legal department, alleged that Fedorov had asked him to resign and threatened him with action by law enforcement. Fedorov dismissed the alleged threats as rumours when asked about them by Telegraf. Denshchyk was shot dead in Zaporizhzhia on 11 June. In its reporting on the killing, Ukrainska Pravda also recounted his earlier allegation and reported that Fedorov had said the investigation would receive close oversight.

== Financial disclosures ==
In his 2025 asset declaration, Fedorov reported UAH 2,182,379 in salary, UAH 1.45 million in cash and around UAH 345,000 in bank accounts. He declared ownership of a 166.8-square-metre (1,795 sq ft) house and a 518-square-metre (5,580 sq ft) plot in Zaporizhzhia, and a 61.9-square-metre (666 sq ft) apartment in Melitopol. He also declared the use of another apartment in Melitopol and rented accommodation in Zaporizhzhia.

Fedorov reported buying a Toyota Camry for UAH 2,029,528 in September 2025 and using a BMW X6 owned by his brother Oleksandr. He declared a loan of US$135,163 made to another person and an outstanding loan balance of UAH 1,359,092 at the end of the year.

== Awards ==
On 6 March 2022, Fedorov was awarded the Order for Courage III Class for significant personal contribution to the protection of state sovereignty and territorial integrity of Ukraine, courage and selfless actions shown during the organization of defense of settlements from Russian army during the Battle of Melitopol. He has been awarded the Order of Merit to Zaporizhizhia Oblast II and III class in 2020 and 2017 respectively.

== See also ==
- List of kidnappings (2020–present)
