= Anatolii Kurtiev =

Ukrainian politician, acting mayor of Zaporizhzhia

- Анатолій Куртєв
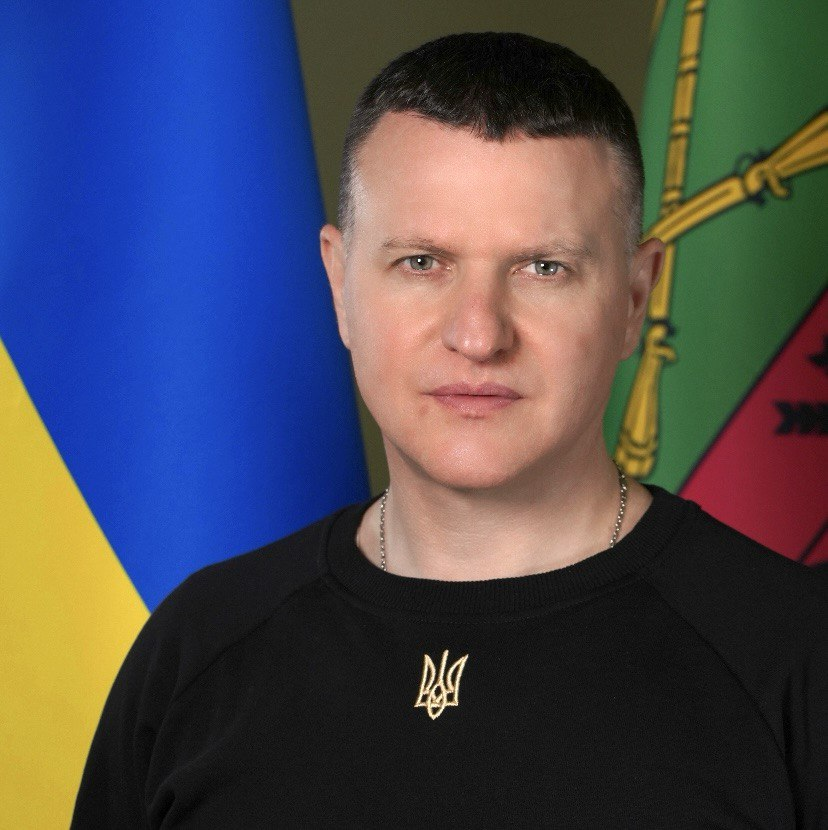
- Official portrait, c. 2024

Acting Mayor of Zaporizhzhia
- In office 29 September 2021 – 24 April 2024
- Preceded by: Volodymyr Buryak
- Succeeded by: Rehina Kharchenko

Secretary of the Zaporizhzhia City Council
- In office 24 April 2020 – 24 April 2024
- Succeeded by: Rehina Kharchenko

Personal details
- Born: 7 May 1975 (age 51) Zaporizhzhia, Ukrainian SSR, Soviet Union
- Party: UKROP; Servant of the People
- Website: t.me/kurtievofficial

Anatolii Valentynovych Kurtiev (Ukrainian: Анатолій Валентинович Куртєв; born on 7 May 1975) is a Ukrainian politician who is the acting Mayor of Zaporizhzhia since 29 September 2021. He is the former head of the Zaporizhzhia Regional Bureau of Forensic Medical Examination of the Zaporizhzhia Oblast Council.

== Biography ==
Anatolii Kurtiev was born in Zaporizhzhia, Ukraine on 7 May 1975.

=== Education ===
In 1998, Kurtiev graduated from Zaporizhzhia State Medical University with a specialty in Pediatrics. In 2015, he graduated from the Classic Private University with a degree in Law, returning later to graduate a second time with a degree in Management in 2020.

=== Employment ===
From September 1995 to July 1998, he was a medical fellow of the Zaporizhzhia regional drug dispensary.

From March 2002 to July 2004, he was a morgue attendant of the department of on-duty forensic medical experts of the Bureau of Forensic Medical Examination of the Zaporizhia Regional Department of Health Care.

From August 2004 to August 2005, he was an intern at the Forensic Medical Examination Bureau of the Zaporizhia Regional Department of Health Care.

From August 2005 to November 2009, he was a forensic medical expert of the Forensic Medical Examination Bureau of the Zaporizhzhia Regional Department of Health Care.

From December 2009 to February 2013, he was the head of the organizational and methodological department of the Forensic Medical Examination Bureau of the Department of Health Care of the Zaporizhzhia Regional State Administration.

From March to August 2013, he was the deputy head of the Forensic Medical Examination Bureau of the Department of Health Care of the Zaporizhzhia Regional State Administration.

Between January 2014 and May 2016, he was the head of the "Levanevsky" cemetery of the Zaporizhzhia Ritual Service.

In 2015, Kurtiev ran for the city and regional councils from the UKROP party, but did not receive a mandate.

Between May 2016 to April 2021, he was the Head of the Zaporizhzhia Regional Bureau of Forensic Examination of the Zaporizhia Oblast Council.

==== Political career ====
In 2020, Kurtiev was elected to the Zaporizhzhia City Council from the Servant of the People party.

23 April 2021 he was appointed Secretary of the Zaporizhzhia City Council.

On 29 September 2021, Kurtiev became the acting mayor of Zaporizhzhia, because mayor Buriak resigned, and according to the law of Ukraine, secretary of the city council becomes the acting mayor.

On April 24, 2024, a session of the Zaporizhzhia City Council was held, whereby secret ballot, all 38 deputies present voted for the early termination of Kurtiev's powers. He was not present, and the chairman of the temporary commission on regulations and law and order, law enforcement and corruption prevention, Oleh Korolyov (Олег Корольов), was elected chairman. Rehina Kharchenko was elected the new secretary of the Zaporizhzhia City Council and acting mayor of Zaporizhzhia by 37 votes.

== Crime charges ==
On 25 June 2021, the mayor of Zaporizhzhia, Volodymyr Buriak, signed an order to dismiss Kurtiev from the office of secretary of the city council. The reason was cited as a violation of the law "On Prevention of Corruption" due to the submission of false information in the declaration. On 2 July, the court suspended the order.

He was listed in the "Myrotvorets" database with the qualification "marauding" with other officials of the Zaporizhia Oblast and the city of Zaporizhzhia because of accusations of embezzlement of humanitarian aid.
