= Volodymyr Kaltsev =

Ukrainian politician

- Володимир Кальцев
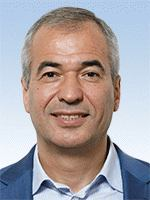

Member of the Verkhovna Rada
- Incumbent
- Assumed office 29 August 2019

Secretary of the Zaporizhzhia City Council
- In office 17 December 2010 – 24 February 2012

Mayor of Zaporizhzhia (acting)
- In office 24 September 2010 – 17 December 2010
- Preceded by: Yevhen Kartashov
- Succeeded by: Oleksandr Sin

Personal details
- Born: Volodymyr Fedorovych Kaltsev; 16 June 1966 (age 59) Berdiansk, Zaporizhzhia Oblast, Ukrainian SSR, Soviet Union
- Party: Independent
- Other political affiliations: Party of Regions (until 2014) Our Land (until 2024) Opposition Platform — For Life (until 2024)

Volodymyr Fedorovych Kaltsev (Ukrainian: Володимир Федорович Кальцев; born 16 June 1966), is a Ukrainian politician and activist who has sat as a member of the Verkhovna Rada since 29 August 2019.

A former member of various pro-Russian parties, banned in Ukraine, Kaltsev served as the acting Mayor of Zaporizhzhia in 2010, and had been the 1st Deputy Chairman of the Zaporizhzhia Oblast State Administration at that same year. He also had been the Deputy Chairman of the Zaporizhzhia Oblast State Administration from 2006 to 2008. He is a candidate of Economic Sciences as of 2002, and is an honorary doctor of Zaporizhzhia National University.

== Biography ==
Volodymyr Kaltsev was born in Berdiansk on 16 June 1966 into a working-class family. From September 1973 to June 1983, he was a student, and from September 1983 to June 1984, he was a senior pioneer counselor of Berdyansk secondary school No. 16 of Zaporizhzhia Oblast. From June 1984 to September 1986, he served in the Soviet Army as part of a military contingent in Cuba.

From September 1986 to July 1991, Kaltsev was a student of the Faculty of History of Zaporizhzhia State University, and became a historian, a teacher of history and social sciences. From July 1991 to October 1992, he was an assistant at the Department of Pedagogy and Psychology of Zaporizhzhia State University. From October 1992 to January 1993, he was the head of the advertising and marketing department of the small enterprise "KVF Iveko" in Berdiansk.

In February 1993 to October 1998 Kaltsev was the Director, then in October 1998, was promoted to the chairman of the Board of Founders of Alexander LTD. In July 2001, he was the chairman of the board of founders. In 2002, he defended his candidate's thesis on the topic "Evaluation of economically justified limits for improving the quality of industrial products." In January 2002, he was the chairman of the board of directors. In May of the same year, he was promoted as chairman of the board of directors and chairman of the board of founders of Company "Aleksandr" LLC in Zaporizhia.

Kaltsev joined the Party of Regions in 2003. On 27 May 2006, he became the head of the Zaporizhzhia city organization of the Party of Regions.

From November to December 2006, Kaltsev was an intern for the position of deputy head of the Zaporizhzhia regional state administration. On 27 December 2006, Kaltsev became the deputy head of the Zaporizhia Oblast State Administration for Finance, Economy, and Foreign Economic Activities. He left on 30 May 2008. From June to November 2008, he was the chairman of the board of directors and the chairman of the board of founders of Company "Aleksandr" LLC in Zaporizhia.

From December 2008 to April 2010, Kaltsev was an assistant consultant to People's Deputy of Ukraine Borys Petrov. On 21 April 2010, Kelstev became the 1st deputy head of the Zaporizhia Regional State Administration. On 24 September, Kalstev became the acting Mayor of Zaporizhzhia. On 17 December, he became the Secretary of the Zaporozhzhia City Council. He resigned as secretary on 24 February 2012. In April 2012, he has been an analyst at Alexander Company LLC in Zaporizhia.

Kaltsev left the Party of Regions in 2014 to join the Our Land party. Kalstev was a candidate for People's Deputies from the Opposition Platform — For Life party in the 2019 parliamentary elections, No. 24 on the list. At the time of the elections, he was an analyst at Company "Aleksandr" LLC, was a member of the "Opposition Platform — For Life" party, and lives in Zaporizhzhia.
