= Voznesenivskyi District =

City district of Zaporizhzhia, Ukraine

Voznesenivskyi District Вознесенівський район
- Urban district
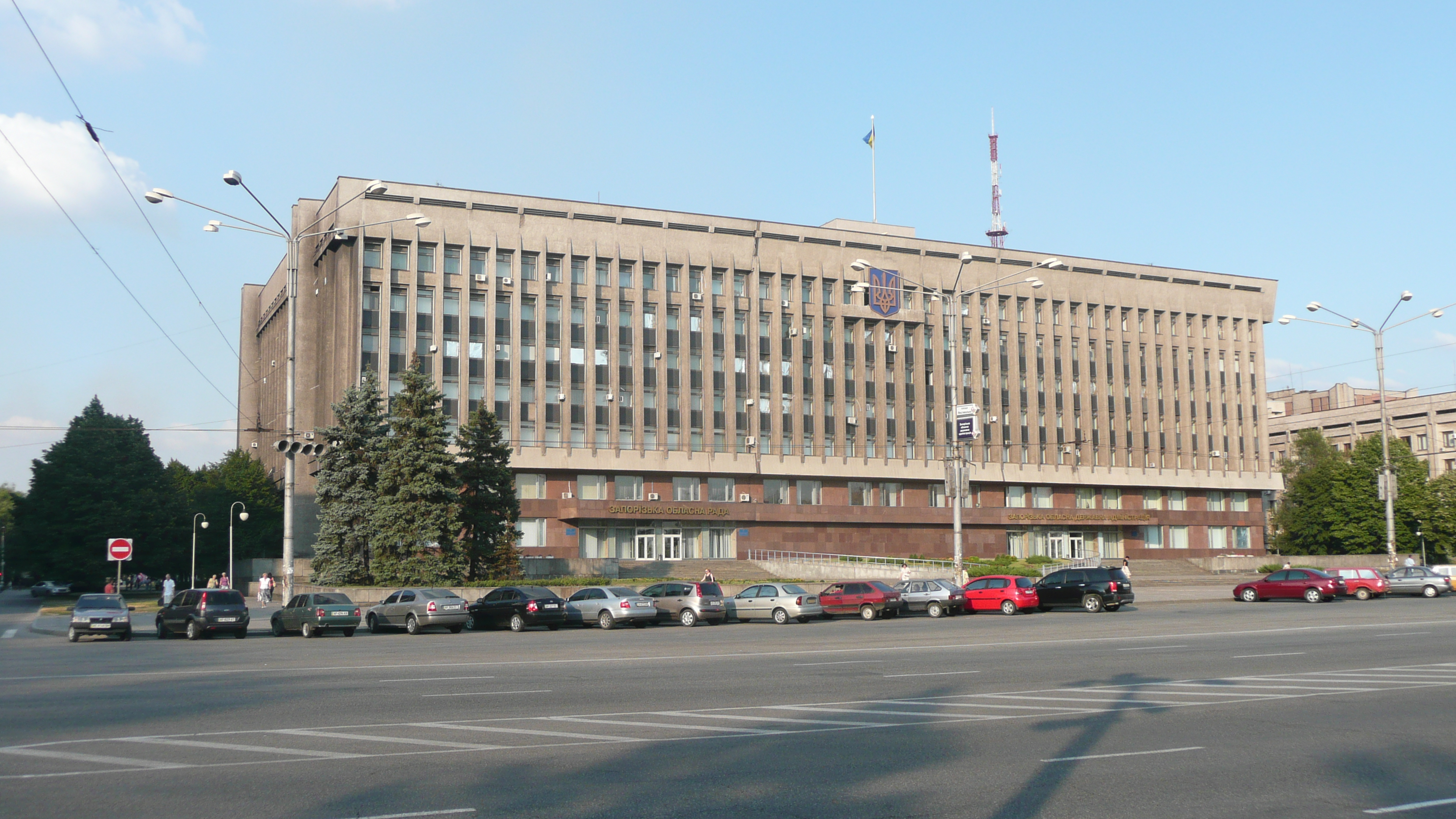
- Zaporizhzhia Regional Administration is located in Voznesenivskyi District

- Location of the urban district on a map of Zaporizhzhia Oblast.
- Coordinates: 47°48′59″N 35°03′17″E
- Country: Ukraine
- City: Zaporizhzhia
- Established: 1939

Government
  - Deputy chairman: Lysenko Vitaly Vladimirovich

Area
  - Total: 50.78 km^{2} (19.61 sq mi)

Population (2014)
  - Total: 102,400 ▲
  - Density: 2,017/km^{2} (5,223/sq mi)
- Time zone: UTC+2 (EET)
  - Summer (DST): UTC+3 (EEST)
- Postal index: 330123
- Area code: +380 61
- KOATUU: 2310137300
- Website: w1.c1.rada.gov.ua/pls/z7502/A005?rdat1=19.01.2015&rf7571=13151

Voznesenivskyi District (Ukrainian: Вознесенівський район) is an administrative-territorial unit within the city of Zaporizhzhia, Ukraine named after the historical village of Voznesenky. The economic and symbolic center of the city and the Zaporizhzhia metropolitan area, it is Zaporizhzhia's oldest district and home to many of region's cultural, financial, educational and historical landmarks including Zaporizhzhia Regional Administration, Krytyy Market and Festival Square.

The district was formed on January 21, 1939, as Ordzhonikidzevskyi District in honor of Sergo Ordzhonikidze. It received its current name on February 19, 2016, by decree of the Ukrainian Government.

== History ==
In ancient times, the Mariupol Road connected Kichkas and the village of Voznesenskaya. A settlement was established at this location by retired soldiers and their families who had served in the Alexander Fortress and did not want to settle in a suburb near the fortress. The name of the settlement was given by leaders of the Church of the Ascension. Cossack Ivan Neskreba and comrades founded the Neskrebivka fishing settlement nearby this original village, which was also called Podgorodny. In 1795, it received the official name of the military settlement of Voznesenka.

In 1858, the well-known local historian Alexander Afanasiev Chuzhbinsky noted in his travel notes “A Trip to the Dnieper Rapids and Zaporizhzhia” that the village of Voznesenskoye was quite crowded and that its inhabitants are mainly engaged in arable farming. He noted at the time that fishing activity was limited to a small number of fishermen who fish almost exclusively for personal and not commercial practice. The village at that time had a bakery and other traces of town like settlement atop a hill overlooking the Dnieper.

Under the Russian Empire the town became a dock and center for storing grain from nearby farms. At that time, at the mouth of the river Mokraya Moskovka there was a grain pier, from where bread was sent to many parts of the Russian Empire and abroad.

In 1886, the village of Voznesenka in 1886 recorded a male population of 1,221. A census report from the time reported that villagers own more than 9 thousand hectares of land. In addition, 292 acres of forest were transferred by officials to the disposal of the villagers on the left bank of the Dnieper at Khortytsia. Voznesenka and the city of Aleksandrovsk were connected by a bridge roughly 90 meters long over the Dry Moskovka River and the Cabbage Ravine. The bridge was maintained "on shares" by the peasants of Voznesenka. To prevent the destruction of the bridge during the spring flood, there were "watchmen" on the river who cut the ice and cleared debris. D. I. Yavornitsky wrote in 1888: “Voznesenka stretches along the Dnieper line for 2-3 versts along a rocky-sandy hillock. In Voznesenka there is a parish, a church and school.

In 1843, Taras Shevchenko visited Voznesenka while traveling around Ukraine. Before visiting Khortytsia, the poet spent the night under a pear tree in the family of Prokop Bulat, a Cossack family. Today, near the Embankment, a natural monument Tarasov pear grows, a witness to Shevchenko's stay.

=== Church of the Ascension ===
In the beginning of the 19th century, the wooden military church of Alexander Nevsky was in poor condition. The Church of the Ascension of the Lord was built in Voznesenka to replace the dilapidated structure. Services began in the new church in January 1823. One of the highest points in the district was chosen for construction - Voznesenskaya Gora near a modern house at Central Boulevard No. 22. There was a cemetery next to the church. The parishioners of the church were Cossacks and military settlers and state peasants. In addition to Voznesenka, the church included the landlord village of Markusova and the village of Pavlo-Kichkas (later both merged into the village of Pavlo-Kichkas). The church was demolished in the 1950s as the city expanded rapidly.

=== Early Soviet years ===
During the Russian Civil War (1918–1921), Zaporizhzhia and the Voznesenivskyi District were the scene of fierce fighting between the Red Army and the White armies. The Soviet government industrialized and urbanized the district during the 1920s and 1930s. The Dnieper Hydroelectric Station, Zaporizhzhia Steel Plant, and the Dnieper Aluminium Plant were built in adjacent districts causing the population of the district to grow. The district was the scene of enormous suffering during Holodomor. The district was captured by the 1st Panzer Army on August 18, 1941. Nearly all of Zaporizhzhia was destroyed between 1941 and 1943. The Soviets retook the District on October 13, 1943.

=== Modern history ===
With the destruction of the Second World War, traces of the older village disappeared from the map of Zaporizhzhia. In 1950, two-story houses were erected along Pobedy Street using modern means of construction to expedite opening. Teams of masons and other workers were able to deliver buildings every 42 days. Until the mid-1950s, Stalinist architecture was the dominant aesthetic design. Sobornyi Avenue - the districts main avenue is almost entirely defined by this architecture giving it a monotonous but grand aesthetic. Festivalnaya Square is also anchored in this method of design. In 1955, the Central Committee of the CPSU banned "excesses" in architecture. The Stalinist style was replaced by Khrushchev style. The first typical brick residential buildings appeared in Voznesenka in 1958. Having solved to a large extent the problem of resettling those in need of housing, the Khrushchevka for many years excluded the aesthetic principles from urban planning but provided ample amounts of housing to a city that badly needed it.

Khrushchevka became the predominant form of residential construction in Zaporizhzhia. Improvements in transportation paired with growing demand for housing led to the development of adjacent urban districts in the city. The opening up of new suburban lands caused the population of Voznesenivskyi District to decline. The population of the district was highest in 1970 and has declined subsequently to just 102,400 in 2014. The steepest period of decline coincided with national trends of emigration and natural population decline. In recent years, the district has seen new commercial construction and even added residents.

== Neighborhoods ==
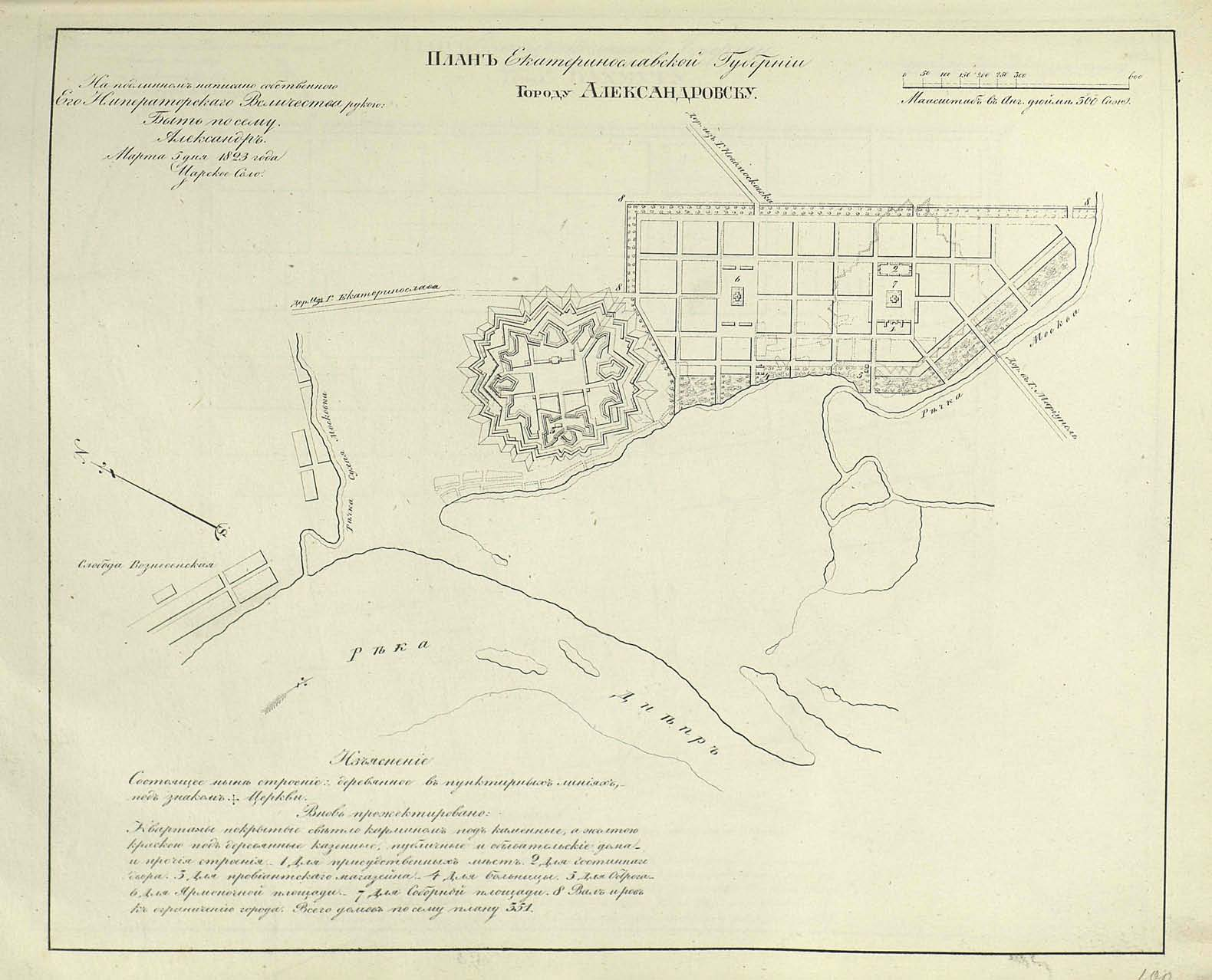
City and Fortress of Aleksandrovsk with Sloboda Voznesenka to northwest (left)

- Voznesenka, former sloboda
- Khortytsia, island
  - Protolcha
  - Chortitza Colony
- Mala Khortytsia, much smaller island

== Orientation ==
The territory of the district covers the central part of the city, most of the administrative institutions are located on its territory, including the Zaporizhzhia Oblast Council, the Governor of Zaporizhzhia Oblast, and the Zaporizhzhia City Council.

On September 4–6, 1970, the city of Zaporizhzhia celebrated its 200th anniversary. One of the points of the program was the unveiling of a commemorative stone block in one of the busiest places of the city - opposite the Ukraine Department Store. Plans were made to erect a grand monument to commemorate the 200th anniversary but work was never completed.

In 1995, Khortytsia Island and Mala Khortytsy, known for numerous archaeological and historical monuments, were also included in the territory of the district. Educational institutions of the district include the Zaporizhzhia State Medical University, a music school, and the Zaporizhzhia State Circus among other entertainment institutions.

== Population ==
Historical Population
Year	Pop.	±%
1959	156,617	—
1970	170,418	+8.8%
1979	152,514	−10.5%
2001	106,300	−30.3%
2010	102,794	−3.3%
2011	102,267	−0.5%
2012	101,915	−0.3%
2014	102,400	+0.5%

Within the limits established in 1995, the district covers an area of 50.78 km^{2}. As of January 1, 2016, the population of the district is 101,500 thousand people. The largest population in the district was observed in the 1970s, later there was a tendency for the population to decrease due to suburbanization and larger national demographic trends.

== Parks and squares ==
There are 5 parks and 11 squares in the Voznesenivskyi District which provides ample green space to residents of this urban residential and commercial area.

== Major institutions ==
The district has several large health care and medical institutions.

- Central Hospital of Vozneseniv District
- 6 City Clinical Hospital
- Regional Infectious Disease Clinical Hospital
- Regional Psychiatric Hospital of the Zaporizhzhia Regional Council
- City Clinical Hospital of Emergency and Rapid Medical Care
- Regional Medical Center for Cardiovascular Diseases
- City Children's Clinical Polyclinic No. 2
- Children's City Dental Polyclinic
- Polyclinic department of the CU Zaporizhzhia Regional Center for Prevention and Combating AIDS of the Zaporizhzhia Regional Council
- City Dental Polyclinic No. 4
- City Maternity Hospital No. 5

There are also several major educational institutions including:

- Zaporizhzhia Regional Institute of Postgraduate Pedagogical Education of the Zaporizhzhia Regional Council
- Zaporizhzhia State Medical University
- Zaporizhzhia Electrical Engineering College of the Zaporizhzhia National Technical University
- Zaporizhzhia Construction College
- Zaporizhzhia Metallurgical College of the Zaporizhzhia State Engineering Academy
- Zaporizhzhia Music School named after P. I. Maiborody

Three colleges, 20 schools, 2 boarding schools, 15 kindergartens, 7 libraries are also located in the district. Major Cultural Institutions include:

- The Palace of Culture "Dniprospetsstal"
- The communal institution Palace of Culture "Orbita"
- The communal institution Palace of Culture "Titan"
- Khortytsia National Reserve
- Museum of the History of Zaporozhian Cossacks
- Zaporizhzhia Regional Art Museum
- Exhibition Hall of the Zaporizhzhia Organization of the National Union of Artists of Ukraine
