= Oleksandr Peklushenko =

Ukrainian politician (1954–2015)

- Олександр Пеклушенко
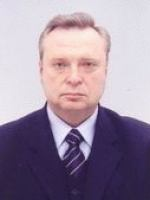
- Official portrait, 2002

Governor of Zaporizhzhia Oblast
- In office 2 November 2011 – 3 March 2014
- Preceded by: Borys Petrov
- Succeeded by: Valeriy Baranov

Member of the Verkhovna Rada
- In office 14 May 2002 – 13 April 2012

Personal details
- Born: Oleksandr Mykolayovych Peklushenko; 29 August 1954 Zaporizhzhia, Ukrainian SSR, Soviet Union
- Died: 12 March 2015 (aged 60) Soniachne, Zaporizhzhia Oblast, Ukraine
- Party: Party of Regions

Oleksandr Mykolayovych Peklushenko (Ukrainian: Пеклушенко Олександр Миколайович; 29 August 1954 – 12 March 2015) was a Ukrainian politician and public figure. He served as a member of the Verkhovna Rada during its IV, V, and VI convocations, and was the chairman of Zaporizhzhia Regional State Administration from 2011–2014. Peklushenko was also a member of the Political Council of the Party of Regions.

== Early life ==
Peklushenko was born on 29 August 1954 in the city of Zaporizhzhia, which was then part of the Ukrainian SSR in the Soviet Union. After graduating from secondary school, he worked as a laborer. He first working as a milling-machine operator at the Zaporizhzhia Experimental Plant, before completing his mandatory military service in the Soviet Armed Forces. Afterwards, he switched to business. He first worked as the deputy director of a local retail enterprise called Zaporizhzhia Oblspozhyvspilka in Avhustynivka. He was then the head of a food-service branch for a combine within the city and chair of the board of the Polohy District Consumer Society. Then, from 1986 to 2002, he was chair of the board of the Zaporizhzhia Regional Consumer Cooperative Union. In 1987 he graduated from the Zaporizhzhia branch of the Donetsk National University of Economics and Trade named after M. Tugan-Baranovsky, and later in 2002 from the Classic Private University.

== Political career ==
In 1982, he first entered politics in the Soviet Union, worked as an instructor for the Zaporizhzhia Regional Committee of the Communist Party until 1986. After returning to private practice, he was elected to the Verkhovna Rada in the 2002 Ukrainian parliamentary election. He would serve in the Rada for its IV, V, and VI convocations (2002-2012). He was a long time member of the Party of Regions in the Rada, and served as Chair of the Committee on Finance and Banking. He resigned his mandate on 13 April 2012.

During his stint in the Rada, he simultaneously served as a representative of Viktor Yanukovych from 2004 to 2005 and as a member of the Presidium of the Party of Regions from April 2008. On 2 November 2011 he was chosen by Yanukovych to serve as Chairman of the Zaporizhzhia Regional State Administration, which he did until 3 March 2014.

== Death ==
On 12 March 2015 Peklushenko was found dead in his house in the village of Snoiachne, located near Zaporizhzhia. He had suffered a gunshot wound to the neck. Authorities initially suggested suicide as the cause of death, but other possibilities including murder, were under investigation. His death occurred during a period when five other former officials serving former Ukrainian President (until the 2014 Ukrainian Revolution) Viktor Yanukovych also died in mysterious circumstances in the 6 weeks before his death.

In 2003, he received the Honorary Diploma of the Cabinet of Ministers of Ukraine.

== See also ==
- Mykhailo Chechetov

Government offices
Preceded by Boris Petrov	Governor of Zaporizhzhia Oblast; 2011–2014	Succeeded by Valery Baranov
