= Mayor of Zaporizhzhia =

The following is a list of mayors of the city of Zaporizhzhia, Ukraine. It includes positions equivalent to mayor, such as chairperson of the Zaporizhzhia City Council's executive committee.

== Mayors ==
=== Russian Empire (1901-1917) ===
- Feliks Frantsevych Movchanovsky, 1901–1911, 1916-1917
- Serhiy Oleksandrovych Tikhomirov, 1907
- Kyrylo Maksymovych Dmitrenko, 1911

=== Soviet Ukraine (1921-1990) ===
- Nikolay Goppe, 1921
- Nikolay Pakhomov, 1921
- Ilya Sidorov, 1921
- Grigory Yashniko, 1921-1922
- Ivan Lyashko, 1922-1925
- Ivan Gavrilov, 1922-1924
- Fyodor Korobkin, 1924
- Ivan Plis, 1925
- Pavel Onishchenko, 1925-1927
- Mikhail Marengolts, 1927-1929
- Yosip Tatarenko, 1929-1930
- Alexander Gavrilovich Sokolov, 1930-1932
- Alexey Neforosny, 1930-1933
- Fyodor Nestruyev, 1932
- Alexander Gubenko, 1932
- Yosip Fukhs, 1932
- Mark Leibenzon, 1932-1935
- Ivan Illich Atanasov, 1933
- Miron Shtikhno, 1933
- Nikolay Kozis, 1933
- Miron Shtikhno, 1933
- Georgy Alekseyenko, 1933-1936
- Mikhail Grushevenko, 1936
- Vasily Struts, 1935-1937
- Yefroim Levitin, 1936-1937
- Nikolay Ivanovich Matveyev, 1937
- Mikhail Grushevenko, 1937
- Dmitry Besov, 1937
- Ivan Markovsky, 1937
- Zakhar Dorofeyev, 1937-1939
- Onufriy Petrochuk, 1937-1938
- Yakim Fedorenko, 1938-1939
- Grigory Bondarenko, 1939-1940
- Pyotr Komarov, 1939-1940
- Fyodor Matyushin, 1940-1941
- Vladimir Scriabin, 1940-1941
- Fyodor Matyushin, 1943-1946
- Yakov Sokirchenko, 1943-1944
- Mikhail Astakhov, 1944-1948
- Leonid Brezhnev, 1946-1947
- Georgy Yenyutin, 1947-1950
- Vladimir Scriabin, 1948-1949
- Georgy Belovol, 1949-1950
- Vladimir Scriabin, 1950
- Mikhail Rudich, 1950-1957
- Mikhail Buchakchisky, 1950-1951
- Alexander Minakov, 1951-1953
- Nikolay Vorobyov (politician), 1953-1961
- Mikhail Burka, 1957-1958
- Ivan Khromikh, 1958-1959
- Ivan Bondaletov, 1959-1962
- Vladimir Ploshchenko, 1961-1971
- Ivan Maliy, 1964-1968
- Yevgeny Pyankov, 1968-1975
- Grigory Kharchenko, 1971-1974
- Valentin Yalansky, 1974-1987
- Ivan Vodeniktov, 1975-1985
- Petro Vanat, 1985-1991
- Volodymyr Vasilyev, 1987-1990

=== Ukraine ===
- Viktor Pankratrov, 1990-1991
- Yuriy Bochkarev, 1990-1992
- Oleksandr Berezhny, 1991
- Yevhen Novikov, 1992
- Oleksandr Holovko, 1992-2000
- Stanislav Selin and Oleksandr Kuzmin, 2000
- Oleksandr Polyak, 2000-2003
- Volodymyr Hryshchenko and Ivan Nalyvayko, 2003
- Yevhen Kartashov, 2003-2010
- Volodymyr Kaltsev, 2010
- Oleksandr Sin, 2010-2015
- Volodymyr Buryak, 2015-2021
- Anatolii Kurtiev 2021-2024
- Rehina Kharchenko, 2024

== See also ==
- History of Zaporizhzhia
