= Oleksandr Starukh =

Ukrainian politician

- Олександр Старух
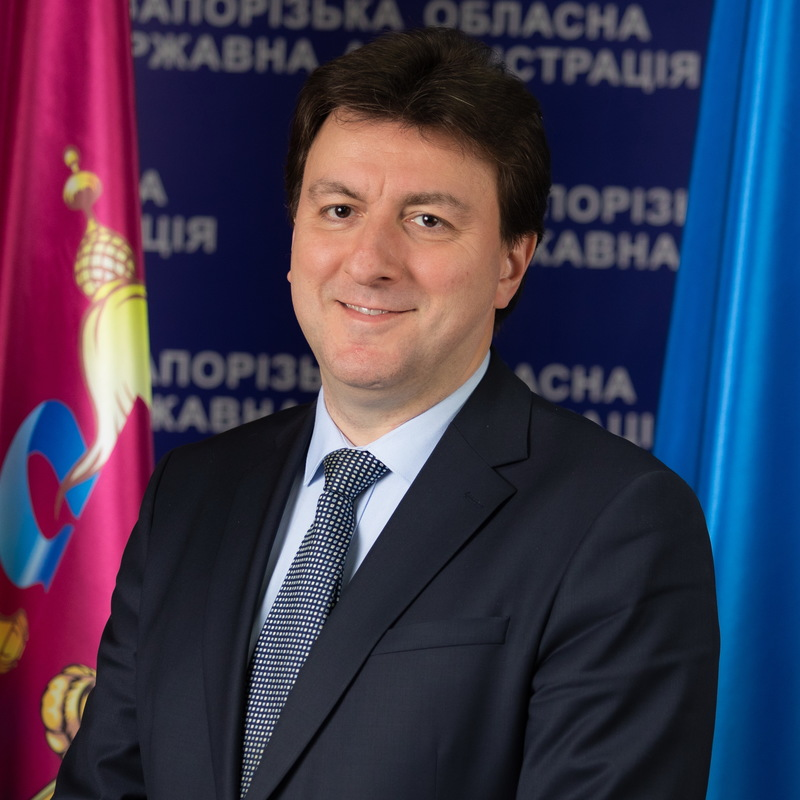
- Official portrait, 2021

Governor of Zaporizhzhia Oblast
- Disputed (Note: Control over Zaporizhzhia Oblast is disputed due to the 2022 Russian invasion of Ukraine. Yevgeny Balitsky was installed by Russia, while Starukh was loyal to the Ukrainian government.)
- In office 18 December 2020 – 24 January 2023; Disputed: 9 May 2022 – 24 January 2023
- President: Volodymyr Zelenskyy
- Preceded by: Vitaliy Bohovin
- Succeeded by: Yuriy Malashko
- In office 25 September 2008 – 18 March 2010; Acting: 30 May 2008 – 25 September 2008
- President: Viktor Yushchenko
- Preceded by: Valeriy Cherkaska (Acting)
- Succeeded by: Borys Petrov

Personal details
- Born: 28 April 1973 (age 52) Zaporizhzhia, Ukrainian SSR, Soviet Union
- Party: Batkivshchyna
- Education: Zaporizhzhia National University
- Occupation: Historian; politician

Oleksandr Vasyliovych Starukh (Ukrainian: Олександр Васильович Старух; born 28 April 1973) is a Ukrainian historian and politician. From 18 December 2020 to 24 January 2023, he was Governor of Zaporizhzhia Oblast. He had previously been Governor of Zaporizhzhia Oblast from 2008 to 2010.

== Biography ==
Starukh studied history at Zaporizhzhia National University (1995). Candidate of Historical Sciences (1998), Associate Professor (2003).

In the 1998 Ukrainian parliamentary election Starukh failed to get elected to the Ukrainian parliament for People's Movement of Ukraine.

In 2007 and 2008 Starukh worked in the Secretariat of the President of Ukraine regional development department.

On 25 September 2008, President Viktor Yushchenko appointed Starukh Governor of Zaporizhzhia Oblast. He was dismissed from this post by Yanukovych on 18 March 2010.

Starukh failed again to go into national politics when in the 2012 Ukrainian parliamentary election; as a candidate of Batkivshchyna he lost in electoral district 75, located in Zaporizhzhia, to Serhiy Kaltsev of Party of Regions. (Kaltsev gained 38.40% of the votes, Starukh finished second with 15.73%.)

In the 2014 Ukrainian parliamentary election Starukh was placed 49th on the (national) election list of Batkivshchyna, but he was not elected because the party won 17 seats on the (national) party list, and two seats in majority constituencies.

In the 2015 Ukrainian local elections Starukh was elected a member of the Zaporizhzhia Oblast Council for Batkivshchyna.

On 18 December 2020 Starukh was (again) appointed as Governor of Zaporizhzhia Oblast by President Volodymyr Zelenskyy.

On 24 January 2023, he was removed from his position as Governor.

Starukh is a member of the All-Ukrainian Union "Fatherland".
