= Yuriy Malashko =

Governor of Zaporizhzhia Oblast, 2023–24

Yurii Malashko
- Юрій Малашко
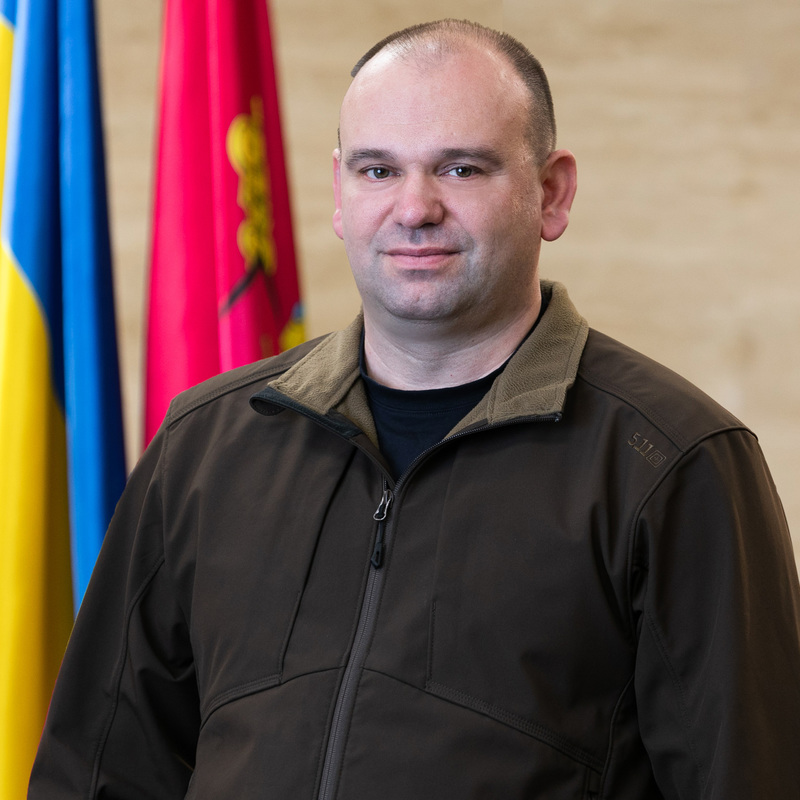
- Malashko in 2023

Governor of Zaporizhzhia Oblast
- Disputed (Note: Control over Zaporizhzhia Oblast is disputed due to the 2022 Russian invasion of Ukraine. Yevgeny Balitsky was installed by Russia, while Malashko was loyal to the Ukrainian government. He was replaced by Oleksandr Starukh on February 2, 2024.)
- In office January 24, 2023 – February 2, 2024
- President: Volodymyr Zelenskyy
- Preceded by: Oleksandr Starukh
- Succeeded by: Ivan Fedorov

Personal details
- Born: 1974 or 1975 (age 50–51)

Yuriy Anatoliiovych Malashko (Ukrainian: Юрій Анатолійович Малашко; born 1974 or 1975), also spelled Yurii, is a Ukrainian politician who served as the Governor of Zaporizhzhia Oblast from February 7, 2023, to February 2, 2024. Prior to this, he was the acting head of the Security Service of Ukraine's Anti-Terrorist Center.

In 2023, Malashko was appointed by Ukrainian President Volodymyr Zelenskyy to replace Oleksandr Starukh. This was during the Russian invasion of Ukraine, after Russia had partially occupied and annexed the oblast, and Ukraine failed to retake it. In 2024, Zelenskyy replaced Malashko with Ivan Fedorov.

== Career ==
By 2023, Malashko had served in the Ukrainian military for three decades. In February 2022, Russia invaded Ukraine. Russia partially occupied Zaporizhzhia Oblast and annexed it months later. On January 24, 2023, Ukrainian President Volodymyr Zelenskyy dismissed the governors of four different oblasts, including Oleksandr Starukh as governor of Zaporizhzhia Oblast. This was part of a purge of government officials accused of "corruption, embezzlement, or treason". On February 7, Zelenskyy signed a decree appointing Malashko as the new governor. At the time, Malashko was the acting head of the Security Service of Ukraine's Anti-Terrorist Center.

As governor, Malashko worked on both civilian and military matters. He worked with the military to deliver drones and camouflage nets to soldiers. He also dealt with evacuating civilians to and from Zaporizhzhia Oblast, as well as getting them aid. There were 800 civilian families near the front line at this time. In April 2023, Malashko asked the region's citizens to avoid going to mass gatherings on Easter Sunday out of caution of attacks by Russia. By June, the Ukrainian military planned to reach the coast of the Azov Sea and "cut off an essential corridor for Russian communications and infrastructure", which Malashko said was going to be "very difficult" because of the extensive line of fortifications put up by the Russians. In June, Malashko announced that Ukraine was performing nuclear disaster response drills near the Zaporizhzhia nuclear plant in case the plant was hit in a terrorist attack by Russia. In August 2023, Malashko met with the Indian Ambassador to Ukraine, Harsh Jain, to receive humanitarian aid. On January 23, 2024, Zelenskyy and Ukraine's Cabinet of Ministers decided to replace Malashko with Ivan Fedorov, the former mayor of Melitopol. Fedorov started serving on February 2.
