= Valeriy Baranov =

Ukrainian politician (1957–2023)

- Валерій Баранов
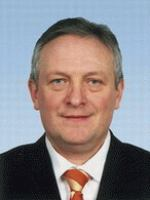
- Official portrait, 2007

Mayor of Berdiansk
- In office 8 December 2020 – 16 November 2021
- Preceded by: Voldoymyr Churny
- Succeeded by: Oleksandr Svidlo

Governor of Zaporizhzhia Oblast
- In office 3 March 2014 – 29 October 2014
- Preceded by: Oleksandr Peklushenko
- Succeeded by: Hryhoriy Samardak

Member of the Verkhovna Rada
- In office 23 November 2007 – 12 December 2012

Personal details
- Born: Valeriy Oleskiyovych Baranov; 19 April 1957 Berdyansk, Ukrainian SSR, Soviet Union
- Died: 5 May 2023 (aged 66) Zaporizhzhia Oblast, Ukraine
- Party: Party of Regions (until 2014)
- Other political affiliations: For the Future

Valeriy Oleksіyovych Baranov (Ukrainian: Валерій Олексійович Баранов; 19 April 1957 – 5 May 2023) was a Ukrainian politician. He served as Governor of Zaporizhzhia Oblast, March – October 2014 and was a People's Deputy of Ukraine (2007–2012).

== Biography ==
Valeriy Baranov was born on 19 April 1957, in Berdyansk. He was married, his spouse Natalya (b. 1956) was a housewife; they had two daughters: Maryna (b. 1977) - a private entrepreneur and Olha (b. 1998).

=== Education ===
- In 1979 he graduated from Zhdanov Metallurgical Institute ("Technology of mechanical engineering, machine tools and instruments", with qualification "Mechanical Engineer").
- In 2001 he graduated from the Dnipropetrovsk branch of the National Academy of Public Administration under the President of Ukraine (major "State Administration" with qualification "Master of Public Administration").

=== Career ===
- 1979 – the repairman of process equipment at Berdyansk plant "Yuzhgidromash"
- 1980–1981 – Production Engineer at "Yuzhgidromash"
- September – December 1981 - Secretary of the Komsomol Committee of Berdyansk engineering college
- 1981–1986 – second, then first Secretary of Berdyansk city Komsomol Committee
- 1986–1988 – Deputy Head of the shop at "Yuzhgidromash"
- 1988–1990 – Head of the organizational department of Berdyansk city Communist Party committee
- 1990–1991 – Second Secretary of Berdyansk city Communist Party committee
- 1991–1998 – CEO of manufacturing enterprise "Avanta" (Berdyansk)

In April 1998 was elected the mayor of Berdyansk.

=== Politics ===
On 23 November 2007, Baranov was elected as People's Deputy of Ukraine from Lytvyn Bloc (in November the faction 2010 renamed itself to People's Party). From 2007 to 2010 he was Deputy Head of the Verkhovna Rada Committee on Construction, Urban Development, Housing and Regional Policy. In November 2010 Valeriy Baranov was appointed the Head of the Budget Committee.

Baranov did not return to parliament after the 2012 Ukrainian parliamentary election after losing in single-member districts number 78 (first-past-the-post wins a parliament seat) located in Zaporizhzhia Oblast.

On 4 March 2014, Baranov was appointed Governor of Zaporizhzhia Oblast by acting President of Ukraine Oleksandr Turchynov.

During the 2020 Ukrainian local elections Baranov was elected the mayor of Berdyansk as a candidate of For the Future. On 16 November 2021 he resigned as mayor due to there not being a majority in the city council.

=== Death ===
Baranov died on 5 May 2023, at the age of 66.

== Awards ==
- December 2000 – Diploma of the Cabinet of Ministers of Ukraine
- December 2000 – Order of Merits of the III class, II class - June 2007
- "Golden Dolphin" award (nominated for "City and Regional Manager of the Year")
- 2002 – a commemorative "For regіonal development"
- 2005 – "Professional Award" badge of Federation of Trade Unions of Ukraine

== See also ==
- 2007 Ukrainian parliamentary election
- List of Ukrainian Parliament Members 2007
- Verkhovna Rada

Government offices
Preceded by Oleksandr Peklushenko	Governor of Zaporizhzhia Oblast; 2014	Succeeded by Hryhoriy Samardak (acting)
