= Volodymyr Hryshchenko =

Ukrainian politician (1945–2023)

Mayor of Zaporizhzhia (acting)
- In office 5 March 2003 – 8 June 2003
- Preceded by: Oleksandr Poliak
- Succeeded by: Yevhen Kartashov

Personal details
- Born: Volodymyr Fedosiyovych Hryshchenko; 5 July 1945 Pryputni, Pryluky Raion, Chernihiv Oblast, Ukrainian SSR, USSR
- Died: 22 June 2023 (aged 77)
- Party: CPSU (until 1991)
- Education: Prydniprovska State Academy of Civil Engineering and Architecture
- Occupation: Engineer

Volodymyr Fedosiyovych Hryshchenko (Ukrainian: Володимир Федосійович Грищенко; 5 July 1945 – 22 June 2023) was a Ukrainian politician and engineer. He served as acting Mayor of Zaporizhzhia from March to June 2003.

== Biography ==
Volodymyr Hryshchenko was born into a peasant family on July 5, 1945. In 1963, he graduated from high school. In 1963-1964, he worked as an electrician and carpenter at the Construction and Installation Department No. 89.

From September 1964 to November 1967, he served in the Soviet Army (in the Group of Soviet Troops in Germany).

From December 1967 to April 1972, he worked as a gas rescuer of the 5th and 6th category, an equipment repairman of the 7th category, and a senior apparatchik at the Zaporizhzhia Ferroalloy Plant.

In 1971, he graduated from the evening department of Zaporizhzhia Construction College as a mechanical technician of construction machinery and equipment.

From April 1972 to September 1979, he worked as a technician of the production preparation group, engineer, mechanic, foreman, and head of the tower crane section of the Zaporizhstroymekhanizatsiya trust.

In 1978, he graduated from the Dnipropetrovs'k Civil Engineering Institute with a degree in construction and road machinery and equipment, and a mechanical engineer of construction machinery and equipment.

In September 1979 - February 1982, he worked as a site foreman, in February 1982 - August 1985 - Chief Engineer, in August 1985 - January 2000 - Head of Zaporizhzhia State Municipal Operational Linear Road Administration.

From January to October 2000, he was the Head of the Municipal Economy Department of the Zaporizhzhia City Council.

In October 2000 - February 2001 - Deputy Mayor of Zaporizhzhia, Head of the Municipal Economy Department of Zaporizhzhia City Council.

February 24, 2001 - December 29, 2010 - 1st Deputy Mayor of Zaporizhzhia

Hryshchenko died on 22 June 2023, at the age of 77.
