= Mayor of Zhytomyr =

The following is a list of mayors of the city of Zhytomyr, Ukraine. It includes positions equivalent to mayor, such as chairperson of the city council executive committee.

== Mayors ==
- Novitsky Florian (Новицький Флоріан), circa 1800
- Ivanov (Іванов), 1814–1815
- Salis (Саліс), 1815–1817
- Gattoni Anthony (Гаттоні Антоній), 1825–1829
- Zeidler (3ейдлер), 1829-1829
- Meyer (Мейер), 1829–1830
- Zeidler Michael (Цейдлер Михайло), circa 1838
- Khmelevsky Maxim (Хмелевський Максим), 1844
- Maslovsky Semyon (Масловський Семен), 1844–1845
- Alexey Dontsov (Донцов Олексій), circa 1845
- Kashperovsky Stanislav (Кашперовський Станіслав), circa 1847
- Zeidler Michael (Цейдлер Михайло), 1847–1862
- Mykola Dorozhynsky (Дорожинський Микола), circa 1849
- Hramchenko Panas (Храмченко Панас), 1862–1865
- Maslovsky Julian (Масловський Юліан), 1865–1867
- Vorontsov Mikhail (Воронцов Михайло), 1867–1876
- Lyashkov Kyprian (Ляшков Кипріян), 1876–1883
- Trull Oscar Ernestovich (Трулль Оскар Ернестович), 1883–1886
- Zholtkevich Ivan Mikhailovich (Жолткевич Іван Михайлович), 1886–1893
- Starosvitskyi Alexander Petrovich (Старосвітський Олександр Петрович), 1895–1897
- Davydovsky Alexander Dmitrievich (Давидовський Олександр Дмитрович), 1898–1908
- Domanevsky Ivan Oskarovich (Доманевський Іван Оскарович), 1909–1915
- Pivotsky Anton Frantsovych (Півоцький Антон Францович), 1917–1919
- Voronitsyn Ivan Petrovich (Вороніцин Іван Петрович), 1919–1920
- Tabakov (Табаков), 1924–1926
- Sumtsov M.M. (Сумцов М.М.), 1926–1927
- Fedot Fedotovich Bega (Бега Федот Федотович), 1927–1928
- Hovor (Говор), 1928–1929
- Yurchenko Yakiv Hryhorovych (Юрченко Яків Григорович), 1929–1930
- Dvorak Karl Matviyovych (Дворжак Карл Матвійович), 1930–1931
- Korobkin Fedir Timofiiovych (Коробкін Федір Тимофійович), 1931–1933
- Bochok Mykhailo Tymofiiovych (Бочок Михайло Тимофійович), 1933
- Weisbein N. (Вейсбейн Н.), 1933–1934
- Kuznetsov Jacob Petrovich (Кузнецов Яків Петрович), 1934–1936
- Hasin (Хасін), 1936–1937
- Achkasov (Ачкасов), 1937–1938
- Didenko Maxim Avksentiyovych (Діденко Максим Авксентійович), 1938
- Rozhanchuk Mykola Mykhailovych (Рожанчук Микола Михайлович), 1938–1939
- Mykhailo Hrechukha, 1938–1939
- Shornikov (Шорніков), 1939
- Syromyatnikov Mikhail Alekseevich (Сиромятников Михайло Олексійович), 1939–1941
- Zhytnii Vladimir Mikhailovich (Житній Володимир Михайлович), 1939–1941
- Oryshchenko Yuriy Andriyovych (Орищенко Юрій Андрійович), 1941
- Pavlovsky Dmitry Alekseevich (Павловський Дмитро Олексійович), 1941–1943
- Spivak Moisey Semenovich (Співак Мойсей Семенович), 1944–1949
- Voinenko Mikhailo Dmitrovich (Войненко Михайло Дмитрович), 1944
- Sokolov Anton Nikolaevich (Соколов Антон Миколайович), 1944–1946
- Kustikov (Кустіков), 1946–1947
- Moroz Kyrylo Matviyovych (Мороз Кирило Матвійович), 1947–1948
- Lavrenov Andrey Alekseevich (Лавреньов Андрій Олексійович), 1949–1950
- Kostyuchenko Sergey Pylypovich (Костюченко Сергій Пилипович), 1949–1950
- Bilyk Kyrylo Leontiyovych (Білик Кирило Леонтійович), 1950–1951
- Botnariov Andrey Mikhailovich (Ботнарьов Андрій Михайлович), 1950–1952
- Prilipko I.A. (Прилипко І.А.), 1951–1952
- Udovytsky Vasyl Semenovych (Удовицький Василь Семенович), 1952–1956
- Volkov Hryhoriy Yosypovych (Волков Григорій Йосипович), 1952–1953
- Grisha Alexander Ivanovich (Гриша Олександр Іванович), 1953–1956
- Janulis Victor Kazimirovich (Януліс Віктор Казимирович), 1956–1969
- Kazmerchuk Lavrentiy Avramovich (Казьмерчук Лаврентій Аврамович), 1956–1958
- Garkavenko George Pavlovich (Гаркавенко Георгій Павлович), 1958–1963
- Lebedev Mykola Yukhymovich (Лебедєв Микола Юхимович), 1963–1969
- Tkachuk Yaroslav Fedorovich (Ткачук Ярослав Федорович), 1969–1978
- Ostrozhynsky Valentin Yevgenyevich (Острожинський Валентин Євгенович), 1969–1973
- Yakovenko Mykola Mikitovich (Яковенко Микола Микитович), 1973–1987
- Kostruba Ivan Fedorovich (Коструба Іван Федорович), 1978–1986
- Khomchuk Leonid Mikhailovich (Хомчук Леонід Михайлович), 1986–1990
- Gudyuk Vladimir Frantsovich (Гудюк Володимир Францович), 1987–1990

=== Ukraine ===
- Mykola Halushko (Галушко Микола Дмитрович), 1990–1991
- Vitaliy Melnychuk (Мельничук Віталій Григорович), 1990–1992
- Anatoliy Fesenko (Фесенко Анатолій Іванович), 1992–2002
- Heorhiy Buravkov (Буравков Георгій Анатолійович), 2002–2006
- Vira Sheludchenko (Шелудченко Віра Тимофіївна), 2006–2010
- Volodymyr Deboy (Дебой Володимир Михайлович), 2010–2015
- Serhii Sukhomlyn (Сухомлин Сергій Іванович), 2015–2024
- Halyna Shymanska (Галина Шиманська), 2024–present

== See also ==
- Zhytomyr history
- History of Zhytomyr (in Ukrainian)
