= Borys Petrov =

Ukrainian metallurgist (born 1952)

- Борис Петров
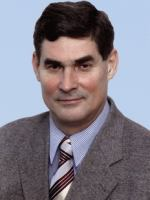
- Official portrait, 2006

Governor of Zaporizhzhia Oblast
- In office 18 March 2010 – 2 November 2011
- Preceded by: Oleksandr Starukh
- Succeeded by: Oleksandr Peklushenko

Member of the Verkhovna Rada
- In office 25 May 2006 – 16 April 2010

Member of the Zaporizhzhia Oblast Council
- In office April 2002 – 25 May 2006

Personal details
- Born: Borys Fedorovych Petrov; 23 June 1952 (age 74) Gelendzhik, Russian SFSR, Soviet Union
- Party: Party of Regions

Borys Fedorovych Petrov (Ukrainian: Борис Федорович Петров; born on 23 June 1952), is a Russian-born Ukrainian politician who served as the Governor of Zaporizhzhia Oblast from 2010 to 2011.

A member of the Party of Regions, he served as a Member of the Verkhovna Rada from 2006 to 2010. He had been a member of the Committee on Legal Policy.

He had been a head of the Zaporizhzhia regional branch of the Party of Regions since October 2001, and was a member of the Politrada of the Party of Regions.

== Biography ==
Borys Petrov was born on 23 June 1952 to family of a military servicemen.

From September 1959 to May 1969, he was a student of secondary school No. 2 in Berdyansk, Zaporizhzhia Oblast. From September 1969 to June 1974, he was a student at the Zaporizhia Mechanical Engineering Institute.

He graduated from the Zaporizhzhya Machine-Building Institute in 1974. From 1974 to 1975, he was a technological engineer of the Zaporizhia transformer industrial association.

In 1975, he was a train fitter, dispatcher, traffic safety inspector, foreman, then 1976, he was promoted as the head of the operation service, the head of the slag dump district, the deputy head of the railway department of the Zaporizhzhia Ferroalloy Plant.

From February 1979 to 1987, he was deputy chief, head of the transport department. From 1987 to 1997, he was deputy director, commercial director of the Dnipro Electrode Plant (later - OJSC "Ukrainian Graphite").

Between November 1997 and April 2006, he was the chairman of the board, general director of OJSC "Ukrainian Graphite" in Zaporizhzhia.

In 2000, he finished the Zaporizhzhia State Engineering Academy, mastering "enterprise economics", economist of industrial enterprises.

He joined Party of Regions in March 2001, and became the Head of the Zaporizhia regional organization of the Party of Regions inn June 2001. He is the member of Politrada of the Party of Regions.

In April 2002, Petrov was a candidate for the People's Deputies of Ukraine from the block "For a united Ukraine!", No. 59 on the list. At the time of the elections, he was the chairman of the Board-General Director of JSC "Ukrgrafit", member of the Party of Regions. He was elected member of the Zaporizhzhia Oblast Council.

On 25 May 2006, Petrov became a Member of the Verkhovna Rada. At the time of the elections: the chairman of the board, the general director of OJSC "Ukrainian Graphite", a member of the PR. He is a member of the committee on Industrial and Regulatory Policy and Entrepreneurship in July 2006, and member of the faction of the Party of Regions since May 2006.

He was reelected as the People's Deputy of Ukraine of the 6th convocation in November 2007, from the Party of Regions, No. 36 on the list.

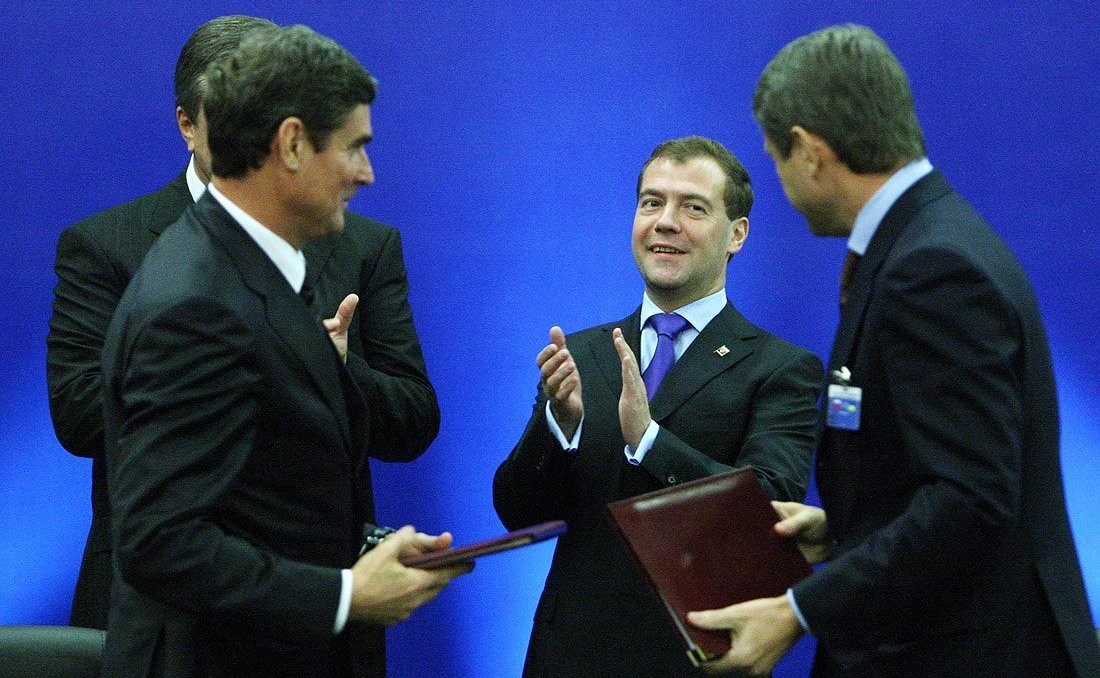
Governor of Zaporizhzhia Oblast Petrov, meeting with Governor of Krasnodar Krai Aleksandr Tkachev and Russian President Dmitry Medvedev on 4 October 2010

On 19 March 2010, Petrov became the Governor of Zaporizhzhia Oblast. On 10 April, he left the Verkhovna Rada.

On 2 November 2011, he was dismissed and replaced by his successor, Oleksandr Peklushenko.

On 24 February 2012, Petrov became an adviser to the President Viktor Yanukovych. Two years later, he was dismissed by acting president Oleksandr Turchynov

== Family ==
He is married to his wife, Olena Viktorivna (born 1969). They couple has two children, son Roman (born 1975), and daughter Yelizaveta (born 1998).
