= Oleksandr Sin =

Ukrainian politician (born 1961)

- Олександр Сін
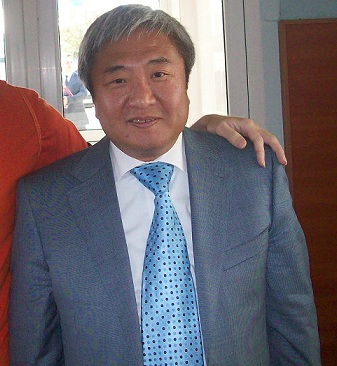
- Sin in 2012

Mayor of Zaporizhzhia
- In office 17 December 2010 – 24 November 2015
- Preceded by: Yevhen Kartashov; Volodymyr Kaltsev (acting)
- Succeeded by: Volodymyr Buryak

Personal details
- Born: April 12, 1961 (age 65) Ordzhonikidze, Dnipropetrovsk Oblast, Ukrainian SSR, Soviet Union (now Pokrov, Ukraine)
- Party: Independent
- Other political affiliations: Batkivshchyna (until 2010); Party of Regions (2012–2014)

Oleksandr Chiensanovych Sin (Ukrainian: Олександр Чєнсанович Сін; born on 12 April 1961) is a Ukrainian politician who was Mayor of Zaporizhzhia from late 2010 to late 2015.

== Biography ==
Sin is ethnically Korean. In 1983 Sin graduated from the Physics Department of the Kiev State University, in 2001 he graduated as economist in Zaporizhzhia State Engineering Academy, in 2005 he graduated as a state management magister in National Academy for Public Administration under the President of Ukraine. After a career in the Soviet industry he became deputy mayor of Zaporizhzhia from 1994 until 1999 and until 2006 in the city's administration. From 2006 until his election as Mayor Sin held various high post in the Zaporizhzhia Regional State Administration.

In October 2010 Sin was elected Mayor of Zaporizhzhia as a candidate of Batkivschyna. In December 2010 Sin left this party "so that no political context is a source of provocations and insinuations about me. I am grateful to the party, that it supported my decision".

In March 2012 Sin joined the Party of Regions.

The Party of Regions expelled Sin, since they said he was responsible for "policy failure and the collapse of the urban economy", on 24 February 2014. The same day Sin refused to resign from his post at the request of protesters of Euromaidan Zaporizhzhia, who were occupying the Zaporizhzhia Oblast regional state administration building at that time.

Sin unsuccessfully stood for re-election as a nonpartisan politician in the 2015 mayoral election, receiving 9% of the vote in the first round of the election. He was succeeded by Volodymyr Buriak.

== See also ==
- List of mayors of Zaporizhzhia
