= Teplychne, Zaporizhzhia =

Teplychne Тепличне
- Former urban-type settlement
- Location of Teplychne in Zaporizhzhia Oblast
- Coordinates: 47°52′18″N 35°16′11″E
- Country: Ukraine
- Municipality: Zaporizhzhia Municipality
- Urban district: Shevchenkivskyi District
- Established: 1946
- Settlement status: 27 September 1991
- Liquidated: 23 April 2009

Population (2001)
  - Total: 2,630
- Time zone: UTC+2 (EET)
  - Summer (DST): UTC+3 (EEST)
- Postal code: 69061
- Area code: +380 61
- Website: http://rada.gov.ua/

Teplychne (Ukrainian: Тепличне) was an urban-type settlement (and constituent unit of its own settlement council) of the Shevchenkivskyi District (urban district) of the Zaporizhzhia Municipality in southern Ukraine. Its population was 2,630 in the 2001 Ukrainian Census.

== Geography ==
Teplychne is located on the eastern outskirts of Zaporizhzhia near the Mokra Moskovka River. It is located to the immediate west of the Zaporizhzhia International Airport.

== History ==
The settlement was first established in 1946 as the village of Zhdanova (Ukrainian: Жданова); it was given the status of an urban-type settlement on 27 September 1991. Teplychne was annexed to Zaporizhzhia's city limits and its status as an urban-type settlement was liquidated following on a resolution of the Zaporizhzhia Oblast Council dated 23 April 2009.
