= Volodymyr Buryak =

Politician from southern Ukraine

- Володимир Буряк
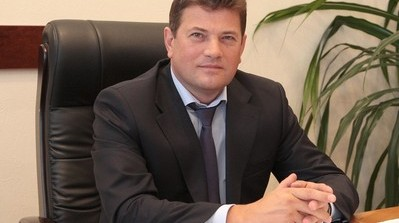

Mayor of Zaporizhzhia
- In office 24 November 2015 – 29 September 2021
- Preceded by: Oleksandr Sin
- Succeeded by: Anatolii Kurtiev

Head Engineer of Zaporizhstal
- In office 2012 – 24 November 2015
- Preceded by: Andriy Zhuk

Personal details
- Born: Volodymyr Viktorovich Buryak; 20 July 1965 (age 61) Kurylivka, Dnipropetrovsk Oblast, Ukrainian SSR, USSR
- Party: Independent
- Children: 1
- Education: Dnipro State Technical University (1987)
- Awards: 3

Volodymyr Viktorovich Buryak (Ukrainian: Володимир Вікторович Буряк; born 20 July 1965) is a Ukrainian engineer and politician who served as the mayor of Zaporizhzhia from 2015 to 2021.

== Early life and education ==
Volodymyr Viktorovich Buryak was born on 20 July 1965 in the village of Kurylivka in the Ukrainian SSR. In 1987, he graduated from the Dnipro State Technical University with a degree in pressure metal processing.

== Career ==
=== Management at Zaporizhstal ===
In 1987, Buryak began his career as a shift foreman in the Zaporizhstal plant. He later became head of his section and an engineer in the planning and distribution bureau. Then from 1992 to 1999, he became the first deputy head of the hot-rolled thin sheet shop in the plant.

Since 1999, Buryak has been the head of production in the plant, and managed all the work of the company's workshops. Then from 2005 to 2012, he was the production director of the plant, and then afterewards as engineering director (chief engineer) until 2015.

On 24 November 2015, Buryak resigned from his post after becoming elected mayor of Zaporizhzhia.

=== Mayor of Zaporizhzhia ===
On 27 September 2015, Buryak registered as a candidate for mayor of Zaporizhzhia during the 2015 Ukrainian local elections. He went on to win the first and second rounds and was elected mayor.

On 25 November 2015, Buryak took the oath of office and officially began his post as mayor. During his time in office, he focused on several aspects, including the audit of the economic activities of city enterprises with the involvement of world-renowned companies; preparation for winter; and addressing problems with housing and communal services by reforming the city municipal enterprise "Osnovaniye"; and the improvement of park areas.

At the end of 2017, after Buryak has been in office for about 2 years, 061 conducted a performance report, which identified several areas where work is still needed for improvement, including in the area of ecology, transport and housing and public utilities. There was also only average progress on major infrastructure projects, schools and kindergartens, along with the city's roads. Specifically, the report noted positive progress on the development of Zaporizhzhia International Airport but insufficient progress on Oak Grove Park.

During the 2019 Ukrainian parliamentary election, Buryak ran as a candidate from the Opposition Bloc and was placed No.8 on the party's list.

As the pollings of the Opposition Bloc declined significantly, Buryak began to formulate a local political project and established the "Volodymyr Buryak Unity Party" in 2020.

On 25 October 2020, during the 2020 Ukrainian local elections, Buryak received 59.9% (101,765 votes) during the first round and was re-elected mayor of Zaporizhzhia.

On 29 September 2021, as Buryak suffered from health problems, the Zaporizhzhia City Council voted in secret ballot to terminate his powers as mayor, and he resigned from his post that same day.

== Honors ==
- Honorary Diploma of the Cabinet of Ministers of Ukraine (2008)
- For Inspired Work III (2010)
- Diploma of the Ministry of Industrial Policy (2013)

== Personal life ==
Buryak is married to his wife Maya, and they have a daughter Maria.
