= Zaporizhzhia City Council =

City council of Zaporhzhzhia, Ukraine

Zaporizhzhia City Council Запорізька міська рада

Type
- Type: Unicameral

Leadership
- Chairman: Vacant
- Secretary: Rehina Kharchenko, Servant of the People; 24 April 2024 - present

Structure
- Seats: 64
- Political groups: Volodymyr Buryak Bloc – Unity (16); Servant of the People (9); European Solidarity (10); Restoration of Ukraine (5); Platform for Life and Peace (7); New Politics (6); Independent (10); Vacant (1)
- Length of term: 5 years

Elections
- Voting system: Proportional representation
- Last election: 25 October 2020
- Next election: 2025 (May be postponed due to martial law in Ukraine)

Meeting place
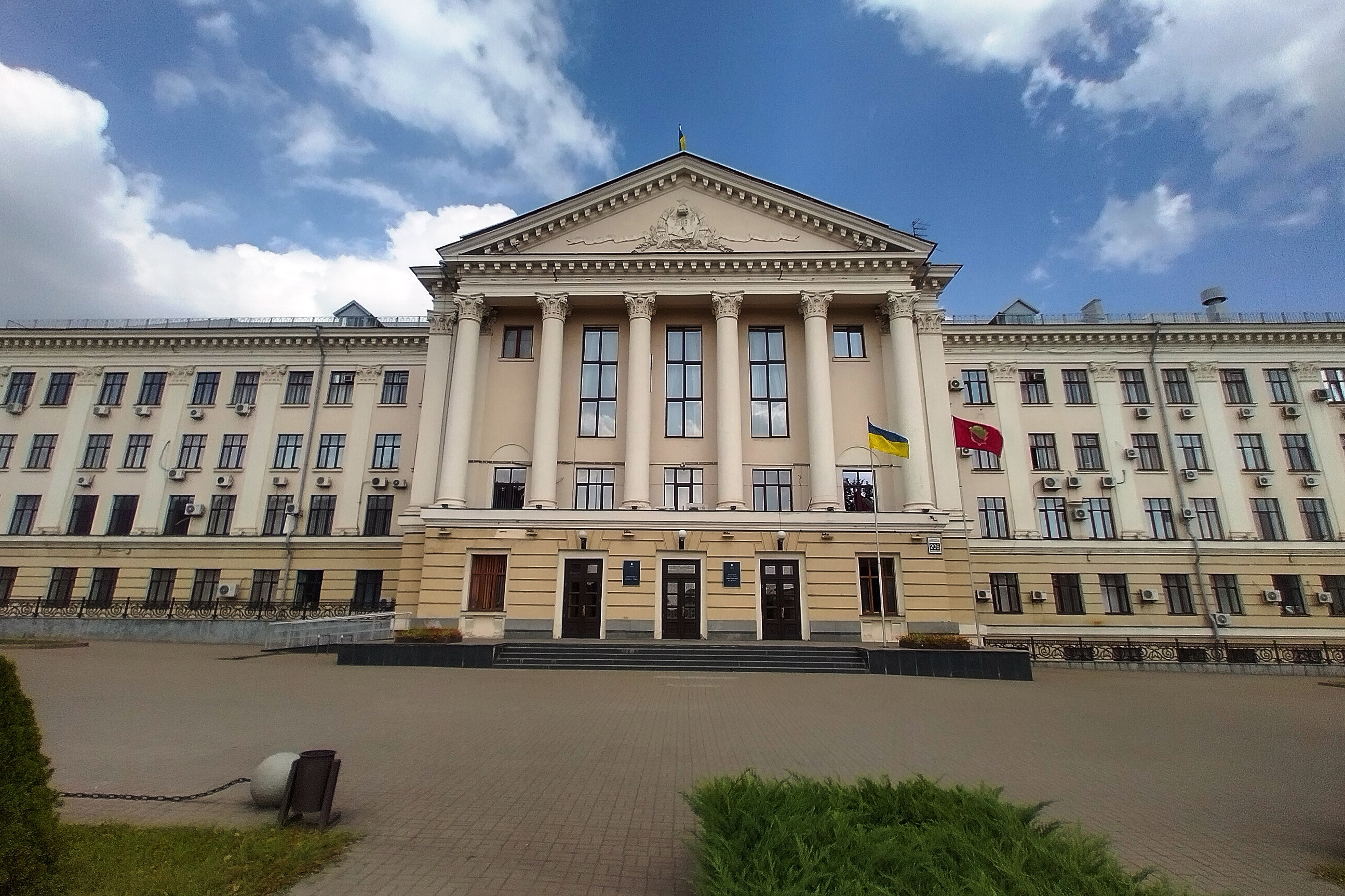
- 206 Sobornyi Avenue, Zaporizhzhia; 47°51′06″N 35°07′01″E

Website
- zp.gov.ua

The Zaporizhzhia City Council (Ukrainian: Запорізька міська рада, Zaporiz’ka mis’ka rada) is a local government area that governs Zaporizhzhia, a city of regional significance located in southeast Ukraine. Its population was 810,620 in the 2001 Ukrainian Census.

== Government ==
The Zaporizhzhia City Council is the municipal council governing the city of Zaporizhzhia in Ukraine. In the last election in 2020, independent candidate for mayor Volodymyr Buryak won the mayoral election, and became the secretary of the city council. However, he later resigned from his post in September 2021 for health reasons.

Before 2020, the city council consisted of 90 locally-elected deputies. Following the 2020 administrative reform, the council now has 64 deputies.

== Administrative divisions ==
The Zaporizhzhia City Council contains a total of seven administrative raions (districts):

- Zavodskyi District
- Khortytskyi District
- Komunarskyi District
- Dniprovskyi District
- Oleksandrivskyi District
- Voznesenskyi District
- Shevchenkivskyi District

The former urban-type settlement of Teplychne (Ukrainian: Тепличне) was previously a settlement council and an administrative unit of the Shevchenko Raion, although it was annexed to Zaporizhzhia's city limits based on a resolution of the Zaporizhzhia Oblast Council dated 23 April 2009.
