= Serhii Sukhomlyn =

Ukrainian politician

- Сергій Сухомлин
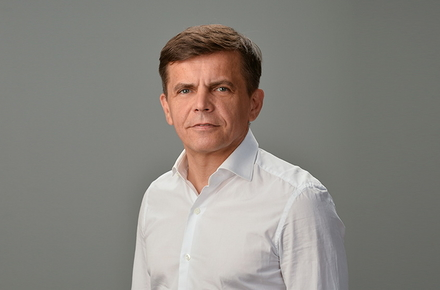

Mayor of Zhytomyr
- In office 15 November 2015 – September 2024
- Preceded by: Volodymyr Deboy
- Succeeded by: Halyna Shymanska (acting)

Personal details
- Born: Serhii Ivanovych Sukhomlyn; 21 June 1971 (age 55) Chervonoarmiysk, Ukrainian SSR, Soviet Union
- Party: Proposition; European Solidarity

Serhii Ivanovych Sukhomlyn (Ukrainian: Сергій Іванович Сухомлин; born on 21 June 1971), is a Ukrainian politician who currently heads the State Agency of Restoration and Development of Infrastructure of Ukraine. Between 2015 and 2024 he served as Mayor of Zhytomyr.

He is a member of the Main Council of the Proposition party.

== Biography ==
Serhii Sukhomlyn was born on 21 June 1971 in Chervonoarmiysk, Rivne region. In 1988, he graduated from the Zhytomyr secondary school No. 21.

He is a graduate of the Kharkov Higher Tank Command School. He passed military service in Zhytomyr. After that, he was the commercial director of the Technotronik and Visage enterprises.

In 2006, he became a deputy of the Zhytomyr city council of the 5th convocation from the Our Ukraine Bloc. Later he joined the United Center party. In 2008, together with his city council colleagues Hennadiy Zubko and Oleksandr Rabinovych, he founded the public organization Our Home Zhytomyr. In October 2009, together with Zubko and Rabinovich, he left the United Center party.

In 2010, Sukhomlyn was elected to the Zhytomyr Oblast Council from the Front for Change. In the parliamentary elections of 2012, he was on the list of "Batkivshchyna", but was not elected. He was part of the Euromaidan. From March 2014 to November 2015, he was the First Deputy Mayor of Zhytomyr. In 2015, Sukhomlyn won the election of the mayor of Zhytomyr as a member of the Petro Poroshenko Bloc party. He took office on 15 November.

In 2016, he graduated from the University of the State Fiscal Service of Ukraine with a degree in Finance and Credit.

On the eve of the 2020 local elections, he joined the Proposition party. In the second round of elections, Sukhomlin won 51.37% of the vote, thus remaining the head of the city for a second term.

In December 2020, Sukhomlyn convinced that a complete lockdown during the quarantine period is only possible if the state provides financial assistance to businesses.

During his tenure as mayor of Zhytomyr the city became a leader in the employment of international grants in the spheres of energy efficiency. During the Russian invasion of Ukraine Sukhomlyn launched a platform for the development of drone technology. He was awarded Order of Merit 3rd class for his work contributing to the defence of local communities.

In September 2024 Sukhomlyn left the post of mayor and was appointed head of the State Agency of Restoration and Development of Infrastructure of Ukraine.

== Family ==
He is married with his wife Svitlana, and has three children - son Andrii and daughters Yulia and Sofia.
