= Antiterrorist Center at the Security Service of Ukraine =

Emblem of the Anti-Terrorist Center

Antiterrorist Center at the Security Service of Ukraine (Ukrainian: Антитерористичний центр СБУ) is a permanent body at the Security Service of Ukraine, which coordinates the activity of the counterterrorism actors in the prevention of terrorist acts against state officials, objects of critical infrastructure and objects of increased danger, as well as acts that threaten life and health of a significant number of people, and termination of such terrorist acts.

Antiterrorist Center was established on December 11, 1998 by the Presidential decree №1343.

The ATC is a legal entity, has an independent balance sheet, accounts in the State Treasury of Ukraine, forms, seals and stamps with its name, as well as a seal with the image of the National Emblem of Ukraine.

== Activity ==
In its activity the ATC follows the Constitution of Ukraine, laws of Ukraine, decrees and orders of the President of Ukraine, acts of the Cabinet of Ministers of Ukraine, Regulations “On the Antiterrorist Center and its coordination groups at the regional bodies of the Security Service of Ukraine”, and other regulatory and legal acts.

The main tasks of the ATC:

- collection, systematization, analysis and estimation of information on terrorism and its trends in Ukraine and abroad;
- development of conceptual bases and counterterrorism programs, recommendations on enhancing the effectiveness of counterterrorism measures in detecting and eliminating reasons and conditions, which facilitate conduction of terrorist acts and other crimes, committed with a terrorist purpose, making-up plans to prevent and suppress terrorist activities;
- organization and conduction of antiterrorist operations and coordination of counterterrorism actors activities;
- organization and conduction of table-top and special-tactical exercises and trainings;
- interaction with foreign special services, law-enforcement agencies and international organizations on the issues of counterterrorism;
- participation in the preparation of draft international treaties, preparation and submission of proposals on improvements of Ukrainian legislation in the field of counterterrorism, financing the conduction of antiterrorist operations carried out by the counterterrorism actors, taking measures on prevention, detection and elimination of the terrorist activities.

In accordance with the Presidential Decree of Ukraine "On Amendments to Certain Decrees of the President of Ukraine" of 09.06.2022 No. 398, the ATC was assigned with new tasks:

- assistance to the intelligence agencies of Ukraine in the implementation of their tasks and performance of the functions provided for by the Law of Ukraine "On Intelligence";
- assistance to operational units of counterterrorism actors in solving the tasks of operational and investigative activities;
- participation in countering subversive manifestations in the prescribed manner.

Also, in 2023 some amendments to the Law of Ukraine “On combating terrorism” were adopted. Due to these amendments the powers of the ATC were expanded and now include;

- formation and maintaining a list of terrorist organizations and groups (legal framework is currently being developed);
- national coordination of the implementation of the UN Security Council Resolutions regarding international terrorism;
- interaction with special services and law-enforcement agencies of foreign countries and international organization regarding issues of combating terrorism and information exchange about passengers of international flights. The ATC and Ukrainian counterterrorism actors has a right to obtain and use the data on passengers in order to fulfil legally defined tasks. Legal framework for creation and functioning of the Passengers information unit (PIU) within the ATC structure is currently being developed.

With the purpose of practicing skills of reacting on the terrorist act, the ATC at the Security Service of Ukraine organizes and coordinates the conduction of the antiterrorist command post and special tactical exercise as well as special trainings. To be more specific, during 2015-2021 more than 9 000 special trainings, 450 exercises were conducted. Also, ATC took part in the international exercises (“Strongboarder-2017” (Ukraine, Moldova), “Bukovyna-2018” (Ukraine, Moldova, Romania), and multinational exercise (“SeaBreeze”, “Rapid Trident”, “Joint Effort”).

== Structure of the ATC ==
The ATC at the SSU consists of:

• The interdepartmental coordination commission is a consultative and advisory body that work in a form of meetings organized in case of necessity but at least once per quarter and in case of a terrorist act or the threat thereof, extraordinary or emergency meetings are convened.

• Headquarters - the executive working body of the ATC at the SSU, which fulfills the tasks assigned to ATC.

• Coordination groups and their headquarters - consultative and advisory bodies created at the regional bodies of the Security Service of Ukraine in accordance with the state administrative-territorial system; the aim of the groups is enhancing the capabilities of the ATC at the SSU in the field in solving the tasks assigned to it.

In case of conduction an antiterrorist operation Military-civilian administrations can be additionally created as part of the ATC at the SSU. They are temporary state bodies appointed to ensure the fulfilment of the Constitution and laws of Ukraine, provide the security of the population, law and order.

== Leadership ==
The Head of the ATC is appointed to the position under the request of the Head of the Security Service of Ukraine and dismissed from the position by the President of Ukraine.

Previous Heads of ATC:

- Colonel General Zemlianskyi Jurii Volodymyrovych 10.11.1999-05.02.2004);
- Lieutenant General Krutov Vasyl Vasyliovych (26.05.2005-20.09.2005);
- Tymoshenko Volodymyr Andriyovych (20.09.2005-29.05.2006);
- Nalyvaichenko Valentyn Oleksandrovych (29.05.2006-06.03.2009);
- Army General of Ukraine Choroshkovskyi Valerii Ivanovych (18.03.2009-11.03.2010);
- Colonel General Shatkovskyi Petro Mykolaiyovych (15.03.2012-30.10.2013);
- Major General Totskyi Volodymyr Volodymyrovych (12.11.2013-26.02.2014);
- Lieutenant-General Vitaliy Antonovych Tsyganok (07.04.2014-14.04.2014);
- Lieutenant General Vasyl Vasylovich Krutov (04.14.2014-07.07.2014);
- Lieutenant-General Vasyl Serhiyovych Hrytsak (07.07.2014-11.15.2016);
- Colonel General Malikov Vitaliy Volodymyrovych (15.11.2016-31.05.2019);
- Major General Baranetsky Ruslan Fedorovych (27.06.2019-26.07.2021).

The current head of the ATC is:

- Major General Andrushchenko Serhiy Anatoliyovych (from 26.07.2021).

== Financing ==
The center is maintained at the expense of funds determined by a separate line in the State Budget of Ukraine.

== International cooperation ==
In accordance with the Presidential Decree of Ukraine of 26.07.2001 No. 570 "On the procedure for interaction with international antiterrorist organizations", the Antiterrorist Center at the Security Service of Ukraine is defined as a state body that has a right to interact with international antiterrorist organizations.

In accordance with numerous international treaties concluded by Ukraine, Ukraine cooperates in the field of combating terrorism with foreign countries, their law enforcement agencies and special services, as well as with international organizations that deals with the fight of international terrorism, including:

- United Nations (UN);
- North Atlantic Treaty Organisation (NATO);
- European Union (EU);
- Council of Europe (CoE);
- EU Agency for Law Enforcement Cooperation (EUROPOL);
- International Criminal Police Organization (INTERPOL);
- Organization for Security and Cooperation in Europe (OSCE);
- Organization for Democracy and Economic Development (GUAM).

== State antiterrorism system of Ukraine ==
The modus operandi of the unified state system for prevention, reaction and termination of terrorist acts and minimization of their consequences, as well as the levels of terrorist threats, and the response measures of the counterterrorism actors to the threat of committing or actual committing a terrorist act are determined by the Regulation "On the Unified State System for Prevention, Reaction, and Termination of Terrorist Acts and minimization of their consequences" (approved by Resolution of the Cabinet of Ministers of Ukraine No. 92 of February 18, 2016). The Antiterrorist Center at the Security Service of Ukraine acts as a coordinating body of the unified state antiterrorism system and actors of the fight against terrorism.

Agencies that are directly involved in the fight against terrorism:

- Security Service of Ukraine as the main body within the antiterrorist system;
- Ministry of Internal Affairs of Ukraine;
- National police;
- Ministry of Defence Ukraine;
- State Emergency Service of Ukraine;
- Administration of the State Border Guard Service of Ukraine;
- State Criminal-Executive Service of Ukraine;
- Administration of State Guard of Ukraine
- Armed Forces of Ukraine;
- National Guard of Ukraine.

In case of necessity, other agencies may be involved in the fight against terrorism:

- central executive body, which implements state policy in the field of prevention and countermeasures against the legalization (laundering) of proceeds from crime, the financing of terrorism, and the financing of the proliferation of weapons of mass destruction;
- Foreign Intelligence Service of Ukraine;
- Ministry of Foreign Affairs of Ukraine;
- State Service of Special Communications and Information Protection of Ukraine;
- central executive bodies, which ensure the formation and implementation of state policy in the field of healthcare;
- central executive bodies, which ensure the formation and implementation of state policy in the electric power, coal, oil and gas complexes;
- central executive body, which implements state policy in the field of management of state-owned objects;
- central executive bodies, which ensure the formation and implementation of state policy in the field of transport;
- central executive bodies, which ensure the formation and implementation of state financial policy;
- central executive bodies that ensure the formation and implementation of state policy in the field of environmental protection;
- central executive bodies, which ensure the formation and implementation of state agrarian policy;
- central executive body, which implements the state tax policy;
- central executive body, which implements the state customs policy;
- State Bureau of Investigation;
- National Anti-Corruption Bureau of Ukraine;
- Economic Security Bureau of Ukraine;
- Court Security Service.

Other central and local executive bodies, local self-government bodies, enterprises, institutions, organizations regardless of subordination and form of ownership, their officials, as well as citizens with their consent may be also involved in antiterrorist operations by decision of the head of the antiterrorist operation in compliance with the requirements of the Ukrainian legislation..

The main tasks of the unified state antiterrorism system include:

- prevention of terrorist activity, including ensuring the timely detection and elimination of causes and conditions that contribute to the commission of terrorist attacks;
- informing the population about the level of terrorist threat or the fact of committing a terrorist attack;
- ensuring the security of objects of possible terrorist attacks, in particular:
  - objects that are under the state protection;
  - important state facilities;
  - objects of increased danger;
  - objects of the unified transport system of Ukraine;
  - particularly important facilities of the electric power industry;
  - foreign diplomatic institutions, consular and other representative offices of foreign countries on the territory of Ukraine;
  - institutions of the State Criminal Enforcement Service;
  - places of mass gathering.

The unified state anti-terrorist system consists of permanent territorial and functional subsystems:

- territorial - includes coordination groups and their headquarters at regional bodies of the Security Service of Ukraine;
- functional - includes the structural units of counterterrorism actors and the Interdepartmental Coordination Commission of the ATC at the SSU.

The unified system allows for 24/7 monitoring, analysis and evaluation of information on the state and trends of the spread of terrorism in Ukraine and beyond.

Within the unified state antiterrorist system counterterrorism actors in accordance with their competence, carry out a constant exchange of information with the ATC; ensure readiness of forces and means involved in antiterrorist operations; provide ATC with proposals for a draft plan for conducting an anti-terrorist operation at the sites of possible terrorist attacks; ensure the appropriate level of protection and protection of objects of possible terrorist attacks; carry out measures to prevent the possible use of weapons, ammunition, explosives, poisonous substances and means of mass destruction during a terrorist act; organize measures to inform and prepare the population for actions in case of a threat or a terrorist act.

In accordance with the regulations on the unified state antiterrorist system Antiterrorist center at the Security Service of Ukraine monitors threats of terrorist acts on the territory of Ukraine and abroad; develops a plan for carrying out an antiterrorist operation at the objects of possible terrorist attacks; determines the need for forces and means involved in the antiterrorist operation; notifies counterterrorist actors about the decision regarding the level of terrorist threat.

Depending on the available information about the threat or committing a terrorist act in Ukraine, the following levels of terrorist threats are established:

- gray (possible threat) - when there are factors (conditions) that are conducive to terrorism;
- blue (potential threat) - when there is an information about preparation of a terrorist attack that needs to be confirmed;
- yellow (feasible threat) – when there is accurate (verified) information about preparation for committing a terrorist act;
- red (real threat) - when the terrorist attack has been committed.

== Operations ==
- War in Donbass (2014–2022)
- Russian invasion of Ukraine (2022–present)

== Composition ==
- Civil–Military Administrations, established as temporary local government units on territories of the Anti-Terrorist Operation.
