= Shevchenkivskyi District, Zaporizhzhia =

City district of Zaporizhzhia, Ukraine

Shevchenkivskyi District Шевченківський район
- Urban district
- Administrative map of Zaporizhzhia; the Shevchenkivskyi District is indicated by the number 7.

- Location within Zaporizhzhia Oblast
- Coordinates: 47°50′56″N 35°15′13″E
- Country: Ukraine
- Municipality: Zaporizhzhia Municipality
- Established: 30 December 1962

Area
  - Total: 98.0 km^{2} (37.8 sq mi)

Population (2001)
  - Total: 157,000
  - Density: 1,600/km^{2} (4,150/sq mi)
- Time zone: UTC+2 (EET)
  - Summer (DST): UTC+3 (EEST)

The Shevchenkivskyi District (Ukrainian: Шевченківський район, Shevchenkivsʹkyi raion) is one of seven administrative urban districts (raions) of the city of Zaporizhzhia, located in southern Ukraine. Its population was 157,000 in the 2001 Ukrainian Census.

== Geography ==
The largest of Zaporizhzhia's seven urban districts, the district has an area of 98.0 square kilometres (37.8 mi^{2}), making up approximately 29.3% of the total administrative area of Zaporizhzhia. The district is located fully on the left (east) side of the Dnieper river.

== History ==
The district was founded in 1962 by separating it from Zhovtnevyi District (since 2016 Oleksandrivskyi District). Following the passage of decommunization laws, in 2016, numerous streets within the district were renamed to replace their Soviet-era names. Some of the new street names include Sikorskyi St., Mykola Kytsenko St., Leonid Prynia St., Maksym Kryvonos St., Bohdan Zavada St., Malv St., and Vasyl Didenko St..

== Neighborhoods ==
- 1st Shevchenkivskyi mikrorayon
- 2nd Shevchenkivskyi mikrorayon
- 3rd Shevchenkivskyi mikrorayon
- Budivelnyk
- Viyskbud
- DD
- Dymytrova
- Zelenyi Yar
- Kalantyrivka
- Levanevskoho
- Teplychne, Zaporizhzhia

== Gallery ==
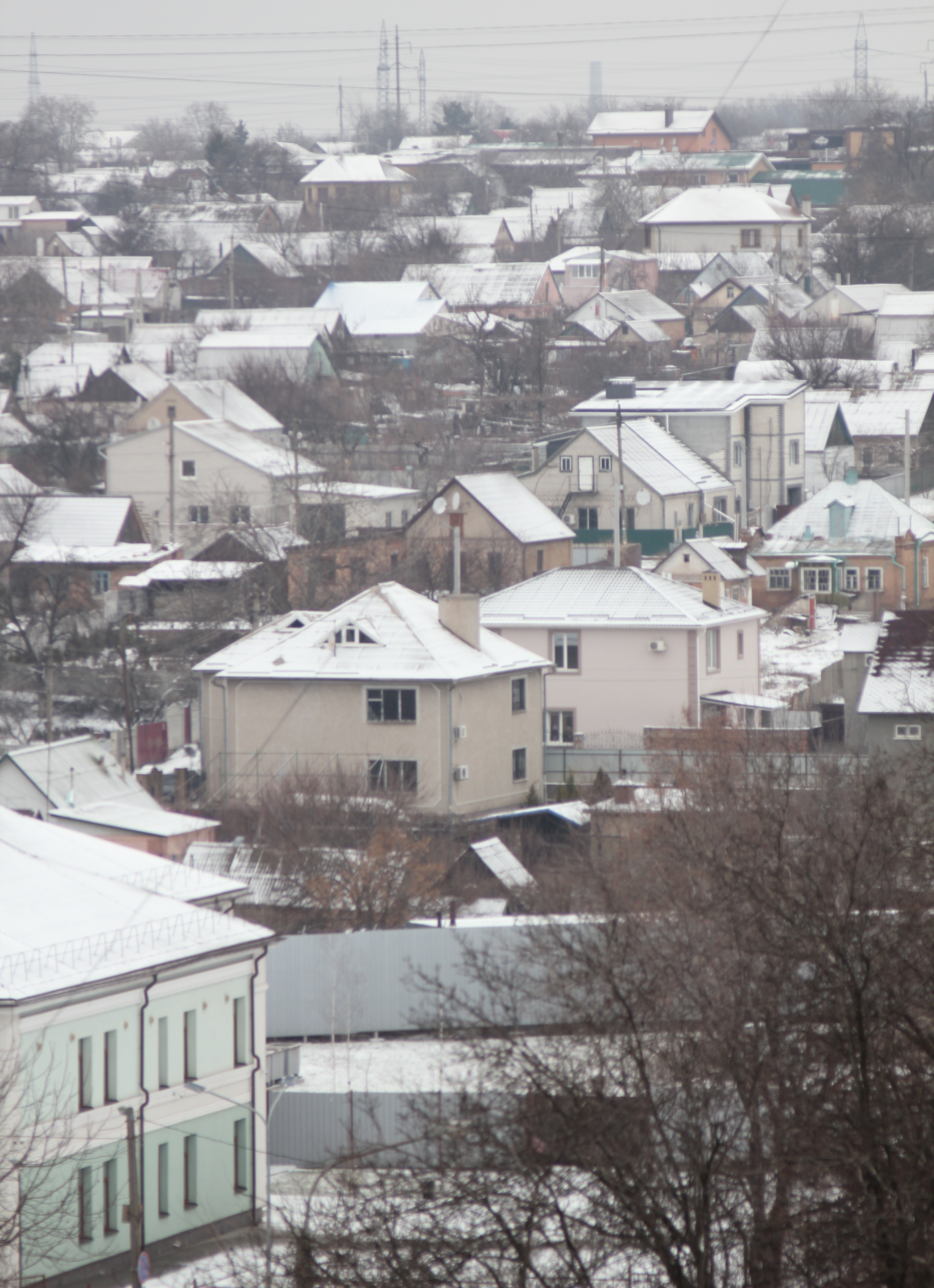
The district in the winter

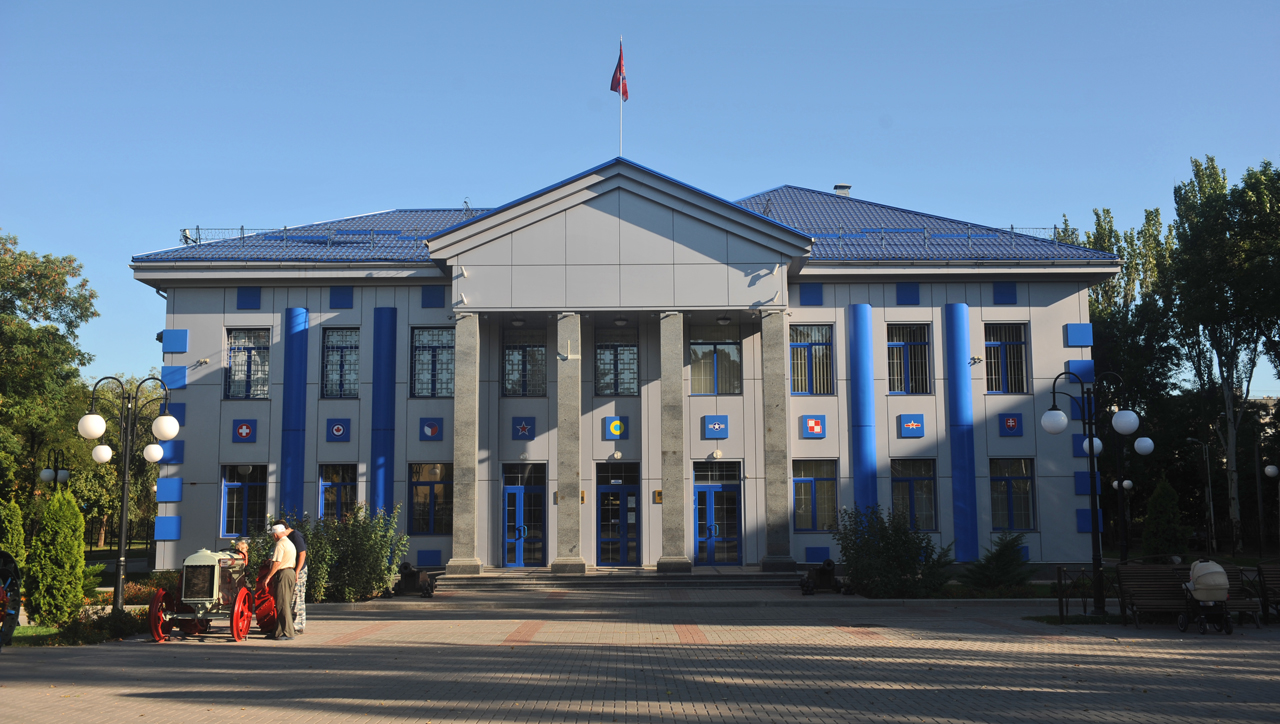
Bohuslayev's Technics Museum

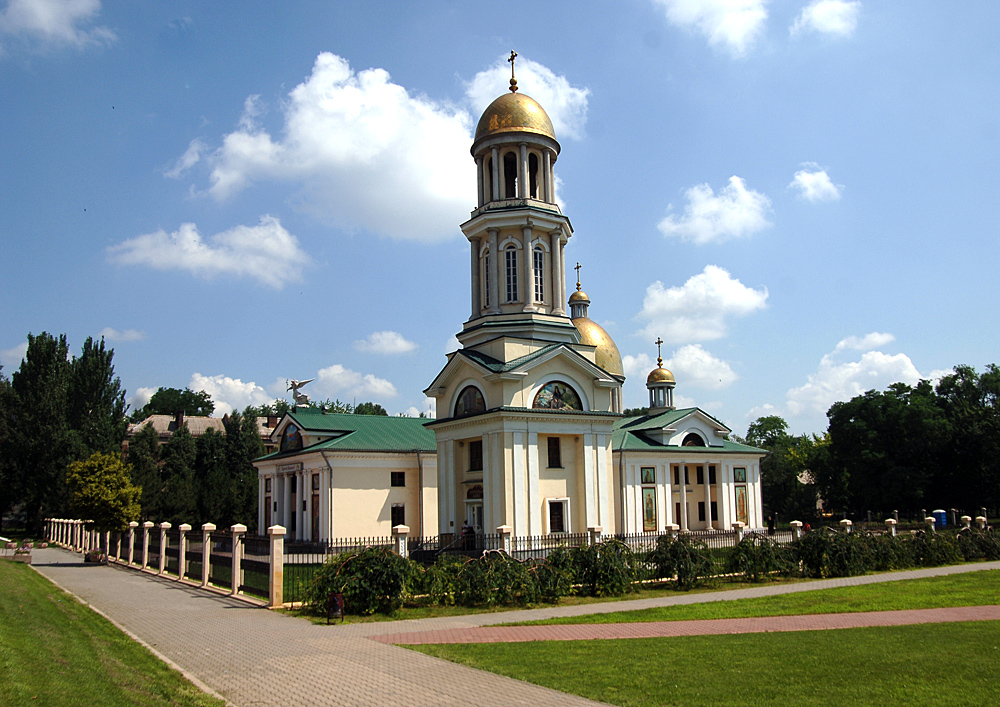
Saint Andrew's Cathedral (Russian Orthodox Church)

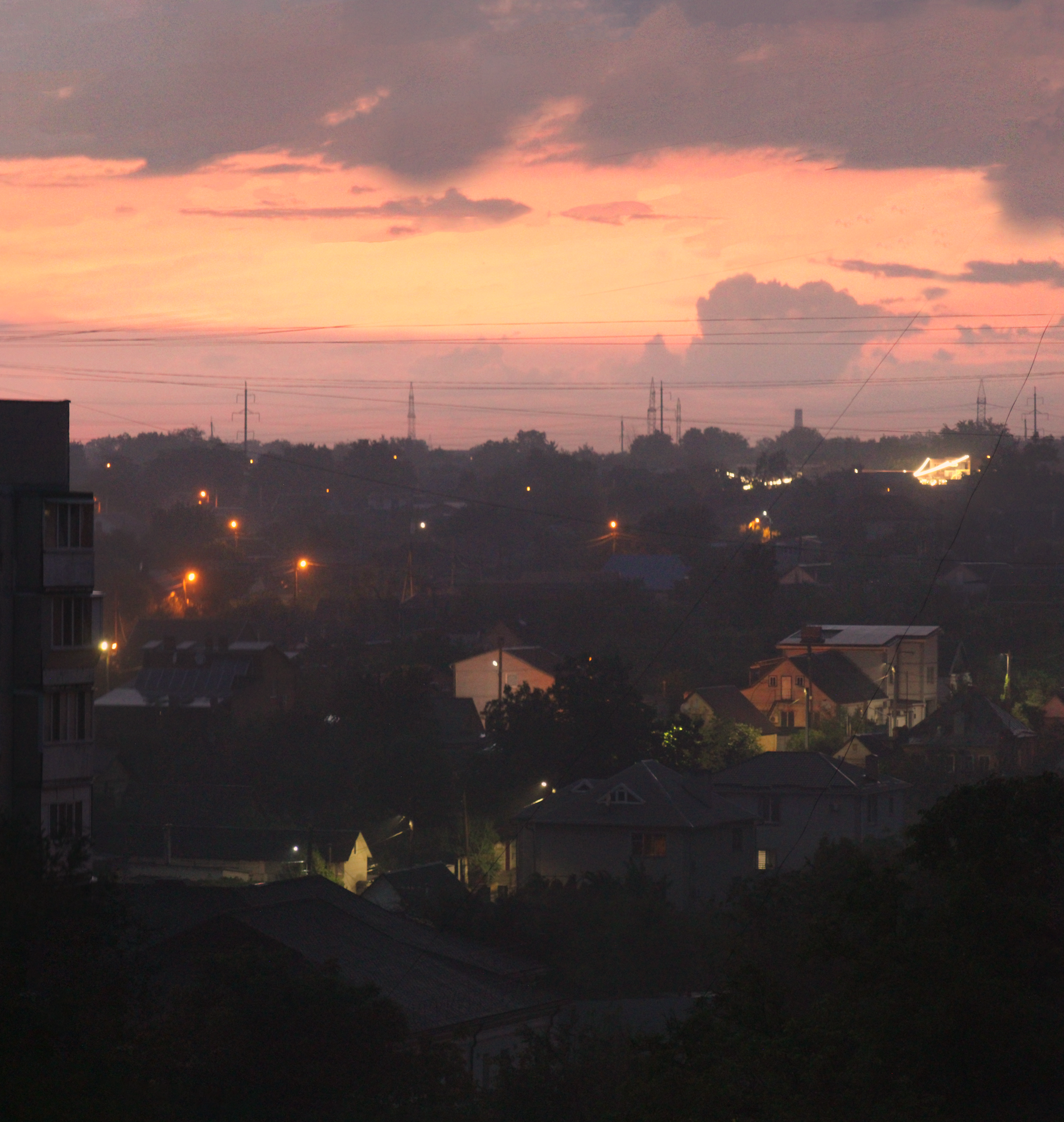
District in summer

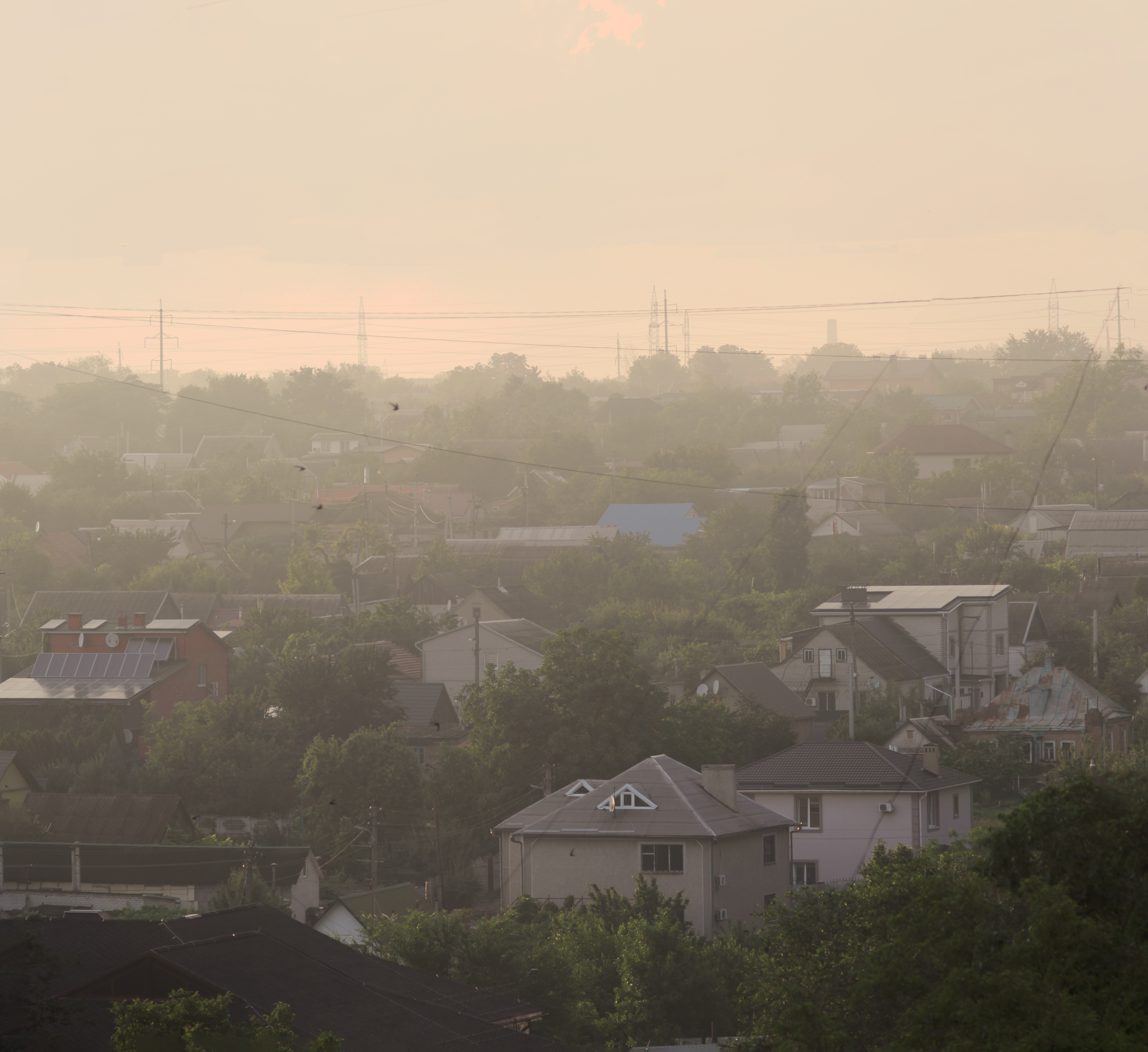
District on a summers evening after rain
