= Rehina Kharchenko =

Ukrainian politician, lawyer and jurist

- Регіна Харченко
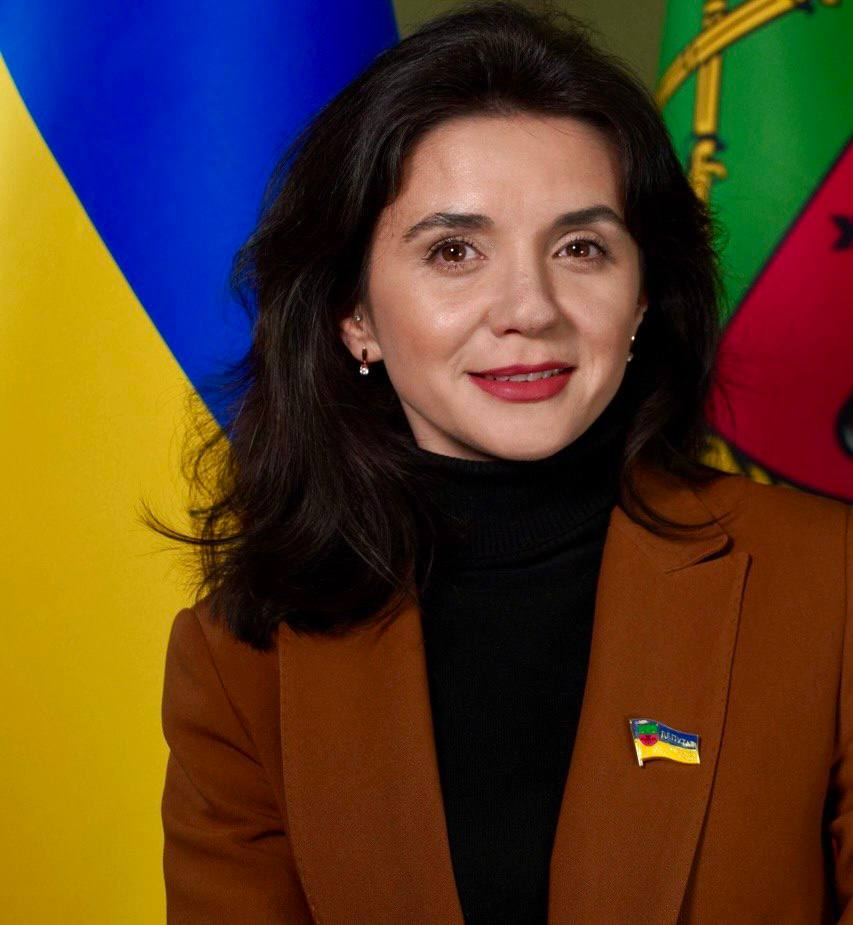
- Official portrait, 2024

Acting Mayor of Zaporizhzhia
- Incumbent
- Assumed office 24 April 2024
- Preceded by: Anatolii Kurtiev (acting)

Personal details
- Born: 21 September 1990 (age 35) Kuchuk-Borash, Pervomaiske Raion, Crimean Oblast, Ukrainian SSR, Soviet Union
- Party: Servant of the People

Rehina Vladyslavivna Kharchenko (Ukrainian: Регіна Владиславівна Харченко; born 21 September 1990) is a Ukrainian politician, lawyer and jurist who is currently serving as mayor of Zaporizhzhia since 24 April 2024.

== Early life and education ==
Kharchenko was born on 21 September 1990 in the village of Oktyabrskoye, Pervomaiske district, Crimean region of the Ukrainian SSR (now Kuchuk-Borash, Kurmansky district of Crimea.

In 2013, she graduated from the Yaroslav the Wise National Law University with a degree in jurisprudence.

== Career ==
From 2013 to 2015, she was the chief specialist-legal adviser of the Pension Fund of Ukraine in the Zhovtnevo district of Zaporozhzhia.

From 2015 to March 2016, she was the chief inspector of the legal department of the specialized state tax inspectorate for servicing large payers in Zaporozhzhia.

From March to September 2016, she was the chief state inspector of the legal department of the Zaporozhye customs of the State Fiscal Service.

From September to December 2016, she was part of the judicial collection department of Zaporozhyeoblenergo.

Between December 2016 and 2021, she was an assistant-consultant to the deputy of the Zaporozhzhia Oblast Council.

In 2017, she became an assistant attorney.

In 2020, Kharchenko became a member of the Zaporozhzhia City Council. She is a member of the standing commission on issues of communal property, resources, privatization, architecture and land relations.

In 2021, she signed a memorandum of partnership and cooperation was signed with the YURCONSALT law office in the field of support for the practice of tax, administrative and labor disputes. By that same year, she had been private entrepreneur.

Kharchenko was the chairman of the faction of the political party "Servant of the People" in the Zaporozhzhia City Council, until 22 April 2024, when believes that she was recalled from the post of head of the faction because she "was not comfortable."

On 24 April, Kharchenko became the acting Mayor of Zaporozhzhia and secretary of the Zaporozhzhia City Council. By secret ballot, 37 of the 38 present deputies of the Zaporozhzhia City Council voted for the appointment. Kharchenko admitted that this position was offered by the Governor of Zaporizhia Oblast, Ivan Fedorov.

The session and election took place with significant violations of the legislation, which were the first to be noticed by the Zaporizhzhia Center of Investigation. At the same time, on 24 April, former acting mayor Anatolii Kurtiev filed a lawsuit in the administrative court against the Zaporizhia City Council regarding the prohibition of certain actions. But the lawsuit was returned to the plaintiff.

As a result of Kharchenko's election to the post, she was excluded from the deputy faction "Servant of the People" in the Zaporizhia City Council, and deputies who are part of the "Metinvest" influence group received a warning from the regional party organization.

Fedorov calls this a "historic decision." Kurtiev stated that this is due to Fedorov's pressure on self-government bodies in order to individually seize power in the city, and he also complains that Fedorov "baselessly" accuses him of involvement in illegal actions, he conveys these remarks to the President of Ukraine, calling the situation "political coup" in the regional center.
