= Soniachne, Zaporizhzhia Raion =

Soniachne Сонячне
- Rural settlement
- Location of Soniachne in Zaporizhzhia Oblast
- Coordinates: 47°53′30″N 35°01′07″E
- Country: Ukraine
- Oblast: Zaporizhzhia Oblast
- District: Zaporizhzhia Raion
- Founded: 1991

Area
  - Total: 10 km^{2} (3.9 sq mi)

Population (2001)
  - Total: 588
  - Density: 59/km^{2} (150/sq mi)
- Time zone: UTC+2 (EET)
  - Summer (DST): UTC+3 (EEST)
- Postal code: 70417
- Area code: +380 612
- Website: http://rada.gov.ua/

Soniachne (Ukrainian: Сонячне) is a rural settlement in the Zaporizhzhia Raion (district) of Zaporizhzhia Oblast in southern Ukraine. Its population was 588 in the 2001 Ukrainian Census. Soniachne is the administrative center of the Soniachne Rural Council, a local government area.

== History ==
1927 — date of foundation as Prymiske village.

1986 — the village of Soniachne was registered (formed).

In 1991, it was renamed to the village of Soniachne.

On June 12, 2020, according to the Order of the Cabinet of Ministers of Ukraine No. 713-r "On the determination of administrative centers and approval of territories of territorial communities of Zaporizhzhia region", it became part of the Shyrokivska village community.

On July 17, 2020, as a result of the administrative-territorial reform and liquidation of the former Zaporizhzhia district (1965-2020), the village became part of the newly formed Zaporizhzhia district.
