= Hryhoriy Samardak =

Ukrainian politician

- Григорій Самардак

Chairman of the Zaporizhzhia Oblast Council
- In office 15 December 2015 – 11 December 2020
- Preceded by: Viktor Mezheiyko
- Succeeded by: Vitaliy Bogovin

Governor of Zaporizhzhia Oblast
- In office 6 April 2015 – 18 December 2015
- Preceded by: Valentyn Reznichenko
- Succeeded by: Konstantyn Bryl

Personal details
- Born: Hryhorii Viktorovych Samardak; 10 August 1971 (age 54) Donetsk, Ukrainian SSR, Soviet Union
- Party: European Solidarity

Hryhorii Viktorovych Samardak (Ukrainian: Григорій Вікторович Самардак; born 10 August 1971) is a Ukrainian politician who served as the Governor of Zaporizhzhia Oblast in 2015. He was the charmain of the Zaporizhzhia Oblast Council from 2015 to 2020.

== Biography ==
Hryhoriy Samardak was born in Donetsk on 10 August 1971.

=== Education ===
From 1988 to 1993, he studied at the Donetsk Commercial Institute, was educated in the specialty "Economics and Management in Trade and Public Catering", was qualified as an "organizer economist".

=== Career ===
From 1993 to 1995, he was the State Tax Inspector of the Currency Control Department of the State Tax Inspectorate for Donetsk Oblast.

From 1995 to 1996, he transferred as State Tax Inspector, and Senior State Inspector of Currency Inspection of the State Tax Inspectorate for the Zaporizhzhia Oblast.

From 1996 to 1997, he was promoted to Senior State Tax Inspector, and the Chief State Tax Inspector of the Department for Control over Currency Operations of the Currency Control Department of the State Tax Administration in the Zaporizhzhia Oblast.

From September to December 1997, hr was the chief state tax inspector of the department for control over taxation of income of residents and non-residents of foreign economic activity of the department of foreign exchange control of the State Tax Administration in the Zaporozhzhia Oblast.

From December 1997 to May 1998, he was a Financial Director of the Limited Liability Company "Joint Ukrainian-Chinese Venture" Timag ", in Zaporozhzhia.

From 1998 to 2001, he was the Head of Credit Department, Head of Active-Passive Operations Department, Head of Financial Management Department, Joint-Stock Commercial Bank "Industrialbank", in Zaporozhzhia.

From 2001 to 2002, he was Deputy Head of the Main Directorate, and the Head of the Fuel and Energy Complex of the Main Directorate of Industry, Energy, Transport and Communications of the Zaporozhzhia Regional State Administration.

From 2002 to 2003, he was Deputy Chairman of the Zaporozhzhia Regional State Administration.

From 2003 to 2005 he was promoted as the First Deputy Chairman of the Zaporozhzhia Regional State Administration.

From February 2005 to February 2006, Samardak temporarily did not work.

From 2005 to 2009, Samardak was the deputy chairman of the board of directors of the Department of Corporate and Investment Operations, First Deputy Chairman of the Board of the Joint-Stock Commercial Bank "Industrialbank", in Zaporozhzhia.

From 2009 to April 2014, he was promoted to First Deputy Chairman of the Board of JSC "Joint-Stock Commercial Bank" Industrialbank ", in Zaporozhzhia.

From 23 April 2014 to 6 April 2015, Samardak was the First Deputy Chairman of the Zaporozhia Regional State Administration.

On 6 April 2015, Samardak was appointed as the Governor of Zaporizhzhia Oblast.

On 15 December 2015, he was elected chairman of the Zaporizhzhia Oblast Council. On 18 December 2015, he was dismissed from the post as the governor.

On 30 March 2020, he contracted coronavirus disease, a total of 13 cases in Zaporizhzhia Oblast in Ukraine.

== Family ==
Samardak is married and has two daughters.
