= Zaporizhzhia Oblast Council =

Legislature of Zaporizhzhia Oblast, Ukraine

Type
- Type: Unicameral
- Houses: 1
- Established: 1991

Leadership
- Speaker: Olena Zhuk

Structure
- Seats: 84
- Political groups: Opposition Platform — For Life (23), banned during war; Servant of the People (19); European Solidarity (10); Volodymyr Buryak Unity (9); Ukraine is Our Home (8); For the Future (8); Fatherland (7)

Elections
- First election: 26 June 1994
- Last election: 25 October 2020

Meeting place
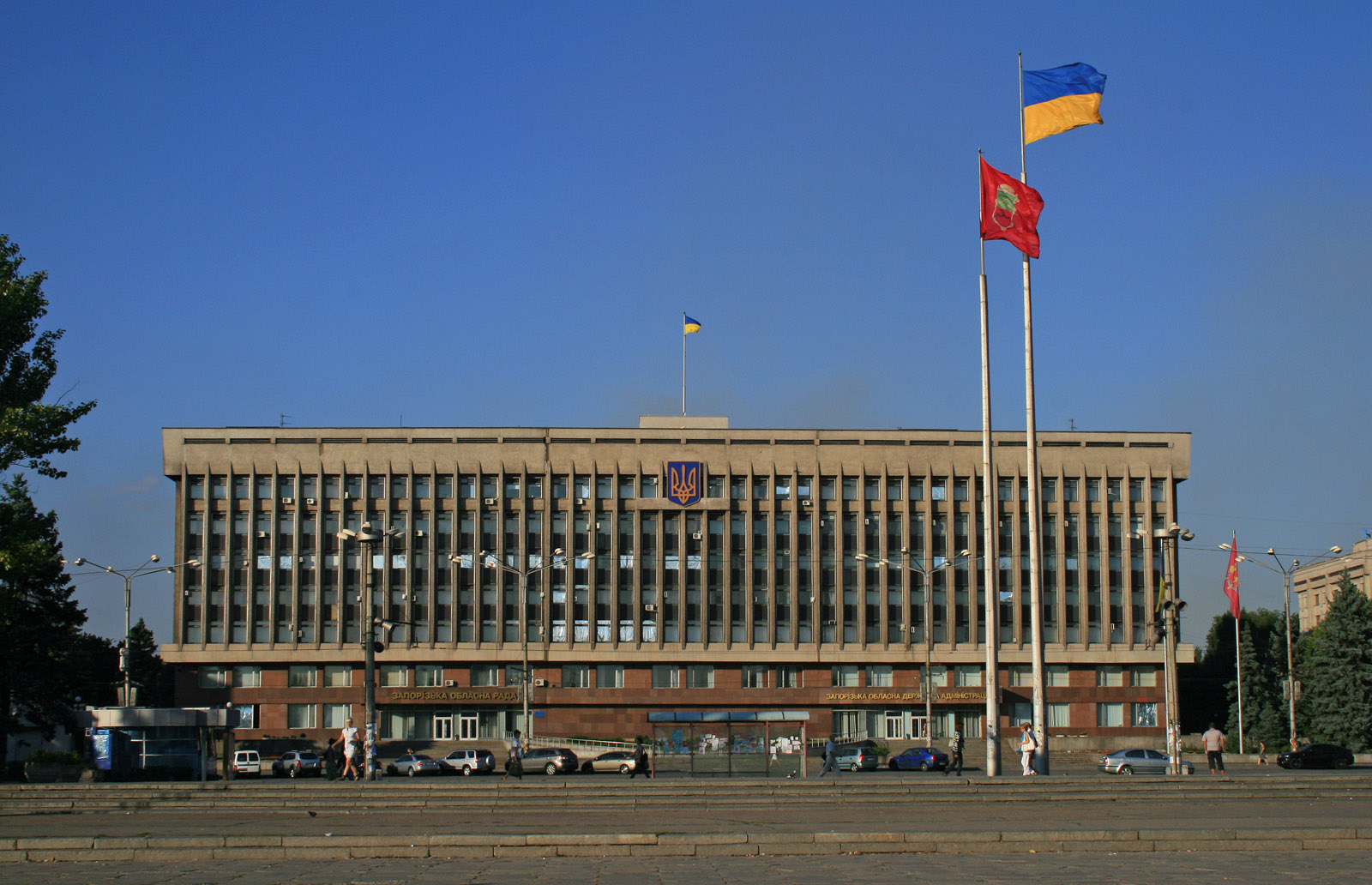
- Zaporizhzhia, Zaporizhzhia Oblast

Website
- https://www.zor.gov.ua

The Zaporizhzhia Oblast Council (Ukrainian: Запорізька обласна рада) is the regional oblast council (parliament) of the Zaporizhzhia Oblast (province) located in eastern Ukraine.

Council members are elected for five year terms. In order to gain representation in the council, a party must gain more than 5 percent of the total vote.

== Recent elections ==
=== 2024 ===
On 21st of March 2024, the Verkhovna Rada transferred the powers of the ZOC to the Zaporizhzhia Regional Military Administration. The reason is the impossibility of gathering a quorum, since some of the deputies are representatives of the territories occupied by Russia.

=== 2020 ===
Distribution of seats after the 2020 Ukrainian local elections

- 23 Opposition Platform — For Life
- 19 Servant of the People
- 10 European Solidarity
- 9 Volodymyr Buryak Unity
- 8 Opposition Bloc
- 8 For the Future
- 7 Fatherland

Election date was 25 October 2020

=== 2015 ===
Distribution of seats after the 2015 Ukrainian local elections

- 28 Opposition Bloc
- 13 Solidarity
- 10 Our Land
- 8 Fatherland
- 7 UKROP
- 6 Radical Party
- 6 Self Reliance
- 6 New Politics

Election date was 25 October 2015

== Chairmen ==
=== Regional executive committee ===
- Daniil Lezhenko (1939)
- Zakhary Dorofeev (1939–1941, 1943–1944)
- Vasily Ponomarenko (1944–1950)
- Nikolai Titov (1950–1951)
- Vasily Ponomarenko (1951–1952)
- Vladimir Skryabin (1952–1958)
- Fyodor Mokrous (1958–1963)
- Pavel Sklyarov (1963–1964; industrial)
- Alexander Guyva (1963–1964; agrarian)
- Pyotr Chervenko (1964; agrarian)
- Fyodor Mokrous (1964–1969)
- Mikhail Khorunzhiy (1969–1976)
- Pyotr Moskalkov (1976–1988)
- Volodymyr Demianov (1988–1991)

=== Regional council ===
- Hryhoriy Kharchenko (1990)
- Vyacheslav Pokhvalsky (1990–1991)
- Volodymyr Demianov (1991–1992)
- Vyacheslav Pokhvalsky (1992–1998)
- Volodymyr Berezovsky (1998–2006)
- Oleksandr Nefiodov (2006–2010)
- Pavlo Matvienko (2010–2013)
- Viktor Mezheyko (2013–2015)
- Hryhoriy Samardak (2015–2020)
- Vitaliy Bogovin (2020)
- Olena Zhuk (since 2020)
