= Fedosey =

Fedosey or Fedosei is a lay form of the Russian masculine given name Feodosiy, Theodosius. The colloquial form is Fedos. Feminine form: Fedosya. It gave rise to the surnames Fedoseyev, Fedoseyenko,, Fedosov

Notable people with the name include:

- Fedosei Ciumacenco (Fedosey Chumachenko; born 1973), Soviet and Moldovan race walker

== See also ==
- Fedot
