= Barefoot in Athens =

- Written by: Maxwell Anderson (play); Robert Hartung (adaptation)
- Directed by: George Schaefer
- Starring: Peter Ustinov
- Music by: Bernard Green
- Country of origin: United States
- Original language: English

Production
- Producer: George Schaefer
- Running time: 76 min.

Original release
- Release: 1966

Barefoot in Athens is a 1966 Hallmark Hall of Fame television film directed by George Schaefer. It stars Peter Ustinov, Geraldine Page, Anthony Quayle, Lloyd Bochner and Christopher Walken in his film debut.

== Plot ==
The film concerns the trial and last days of Socrates.

== Cast ==
- Peter Ustinov as Socrates
- Geraldine Page as Xantippe
- Anthony Quayle as King Pausanias of Sparta
- Lloyd Bochner as Critias
- Christopher Walken as Lamprocles
- Salome Jens as Theodote
- Eric Berry as Meletos
- Frank Griso as Lysis

== Production ==
=== Development ===
The film was adapted by Robert Hartung from the 1951 Maxwell Anderson play of the same name.

== Reception ==
=== Awards ===
Ustinov won an Emmy Award for his performance in this film.
