= Fedotov =

Fedotov (Федотов) or Fedotova (feminine) is a common Russian last name from the given name Fedot, borrowed from Greek: Θεόδοτος "given by God". Belarusian form is Фядотаў, Fyadotaw, Fiadotau, Ukrainian: Fedotiv. It may refer to the following people:

Association football players

- Denis Fedotov (born 1977)
- Gleb Fedotov (born 1995)
- Grigory Fedotov (1916–1957)
- Renāte Fedotova (born 1996)
- Semyon Fedotov (born 1992)
- Sergey Fedotov
- Vitaliy Fedotov (born 1991)
- Vladimir Fedotov, several people
- Vladislav Fedotov (born 1997)
- Yevgeni Fedotov (born 1976)

Others

- Aleksandr Fedotov (1841–1895), Russian actor and dramatist
- Aleksandr Vasilyevich Fedotov (1932–1984), Soviet test pilot and Hero of the Soviet Union
- Anastasia Fedotova (born 1998), Russian water polo player
- Anatoli Fedotov (born 1966), Russian ice hockey player
- Georgy Fedotov, Russian religious thinker, historian and publicist
- Glikeriya Fedotova (1846–1925), Russian actress
- Irina Fedotova (born 1975), Russian rower
- Ivan Fedotov (born 1996), Russian ice hockey goaltender
- Lyudmila Fedotova (born 1986), Kazakhstani skier
- Maria Fedotova-Nulgynet (born 1946), Russian Evenk poet, children's writer, and storyteller
- Nadezhda Glyzina-Fedotova (born 1988), Russian water polo player
- Maxim Fedotov (born 1961), Russian violinist
- Pavel Fedotov (1815–1852), Russian painter
- Pyotr Fedotov (1900–1963), Soviet security and intelligence officer
- Sergei Fedotov, a member of Russian GRU Unit 29155 implicated in assassinations
- Sergey Fedotov (theatre director) (born 1961), Russian actor and theatre director
- Sergey Fedotov (seismologist) (1931–2019), Soviet and Russian volcanologist and seismologist
- Vasily Fedotov (1915–1997), major general of the Soviet Army
- Yury Fedotov (1947–2022), Russian Ambassador to the United Kingdom
