= Zaporizhzhia State Engineering Academy =

College in Zaporizhzhia, Ukraine

Coordinates: 47°51′39″N 35°6′8″E

Engineering Institute of Zaporizhzhya National University
- Інженерний інститут Запорізького національного університету
- Motto: PER ASPERA AD ASTRA
- Type: Department of national university
- Established: 1959
- Affiliations: Zaporizhzhia National University, Ministry of Education and Science of Ukraine
- Director: Kolomoyets Hennady Pavlovych
- Students: ~3000
- Location: Zaporizhzhia, Ukraine
- Website: old-zdia.znu.edu.ua

The Engineering Institute of Zaporizhzhya National University (formerly Zaporizhzhia State Engineering Academy (ZSEA, Ukrainian: Запорізька державна інженерна академія, romanized: Zaporiz'ka Deržavna Inženerna Akademija) originally Zaporizhzhia Industrial institute of IV Accreditation level) is a department of state-sponsored university. Since October 2018, part of Zaporizhzhia National University as its institute of industry.

== Rectors ==
- Potebnya Yuriy Mykhaylovych − from 1976 to 1983
- Revun Mykhaylo Pavlovych − from 1983 to 2003
- Pozhuyev Volodymyr Ivanovych − from 2003 to 2013
- Shvets Yevheniy Yakovych − from 2013 to 2015
- Banakh Viktor Arkadiyovych − from 2015 to 2018

== Directors ==
- Kolomoyets Hennady Pavlovych − since 2018

== History ==
Zaporizhzhia State Engineering Academy was founded in 1959 by the Ministry of Higher Education of USSR as the evening faculty of Dnepropetrovsk Metallurgical Institute. Since 1965 it was a branch of DmetI and since 1976 it became Zaporizhzhia Industrial Institute. Under the leadership of M. Potebnya from a provincial university it became one of the most prominent and fast developing universities not only in Ukraine but in the whole Soviet Union. By Resolution of the Government of Ukraine # 592 issued on 29.08.1994, Zaporizhzhia State Engineering Academy was founded on the basis of Zaporizhzhia Industrial Institute. During its 50-year existence due to a good start it has grown from a branch of a provincial institute into an Academy. Graduates from the Academy completely meet industrial region requirements for staff.

On October 17, 2018 Zaporizhzhia State Engineering Academy was reorganized to become the Industrial Institute of Zaporizhzhya National University. On September 4, 2018, Zaporizhzhia State Academy decided to merge with Zaporizhzhia National University. "The majority of the staff voted in favor of this decision.

== Campuses and buildings ==
The educational complex fully Academy occupies is one city block, which has three main structures, training campus (total area - 9769.7 m), teaching laboratory (8706.9 m), laboratory campus (9043.6 m).

The campus consists of two high-rise residences: № 1, the total area of 7009.6 square meters (320 places) and hostel number 2, an area of 7850.2 square meters, designed for 640 places that have the necessary infrastructure and are located near the educational complex. Sports and physical culture complex on the island of Khortytsia has 3 main buildings with a total area of 5857, 8 m and dining area of 464.8 sq.m. On the shore of the Sea of Azov there is recreation "Montazhnik", where the Academy has a proprietary of 45 places.

== Institutes and faculties ==
=== Metallurgical Faculty ===
Directions: metallurgy, engineering, ecology, environmental protection and balanced use of natural resources

Specialties:

- ferrous metals
- ferrous metallurgy
- metal forming
- metallurgical equipment

=== Faculty of Construction and Water Resources ===
Directions: construction, hydraulics (water recourses)

Specialties:

- industrial and civil
- construction
- Urban Construction and Management
- Water and Wastewater

=== Faculty of Resources and Energy Efficiency ===
Directions: heat power, hydropower, electrical technologies

Specialties:

- heating,
- hydropower,
- energy management

=== Faculty of Information and Computer Technology ===
Directions: software engineering, automation and computer integrated technologies, micro-and nano-electronics, electronic systems

Specialties:

- software systems provision
- automatic process control, physical and biomedical electronics
- electronic systems

=== Faculty of Economics and Management ===
Directions: enterprise economy, economic cybernetics, finance and credit, accounting and auditing, management

Specialties:

- enterprise economy
- economic cybernetics
- credit and finance
- accounting and auditing
- management of organization and
- administration

== Retraining of personnel ==
The Academy gives the opportunity to obtain a second degree simultaneously with the first one or at the Faculty of Postgraduate Education, as well as doctoral studies and postgraduate studies.

== Departments ==
- Department of Ferrous Metals
- Department of Labour Protection and Ecology of metallurgical production
- Department of Graphics and Descriptive Geometry
- Department of Physical Education and Sport
- Department of Metallurgical Equipment
- Department of Metal Forming
- Department of Non-Ferrous Metals
- Department of Chemistry
- Department of Economics Enterprises
- Department of Economic Cybernetics
- Department of Ukrainian Studies
- Department of Foreign Languages
- Department of Finance
- Department of Management Organizations
- Department of Accounting and Auditing
- Department of Economic Theory
- Department of Philosophy and Political Science
- Department of Industrial and civil construction
- Department of Urban Construction and Assets
- Department of Water Supply and Sanitation
- Department of Applied Mechanics and Construction
- Department of Software of automated systems
- Department of Automated process control
- Department of Higher and Applied Mathematics
- Department of Physical and Biomedical Electronics
- Department of Electronic systems
- Department of Physics
- Department of Thermal Engineering
- Department of Hydropower
- Department of Energy Management

== Students ==
There are around 14,000 students in the academy. Students often participate in various activities: gathering, ceremonial meetings (e.g. ritual self-burning of full-size doll of the rector, usually provided by recently graduated students in the beginning of the academic year to wish good luck to first year students), business meetings and concerts, festivals. Students sport achievements - it is one of successful activities developed by the academy. Students of the academy became the Olympic champions, took silver medals. There have been 11 Masters of sport of fencing prepared by the academy. The academy provides an opportunity to engage in basketball, athletics, volleyball, competitions in various sports.

== Staff ==
Educational process and research activities is provided by 447 teachers, including 49 professors, 223 PhDs.

== Infrastructure ==
The Academy has two student dormitories for up to 1280 people with the total area of 14,850 sq.m.

All buildings, constructions, utilities are maintained by Technical Department. This department duties also include supplying the Academy with all necessary equipment and stuff for functioning as well as for studying process.

== Co-operation and international links ==
The Academy cooperates with Zaporizhzhya Law Institute (ZLI). Academy students study at ZLI jurisprudence and receive a law degree. There is International Department in the Academy. Since 1998 a lot of work has been done in the international cooperation area, networking and liaisoning with regional, domestic and international funds and organizations that administer international academic and scientific exchange programs. It also familiarizes students, post-graduate students and staff with current academic programs, grants, internships and provides a comprehensive assistance as to participation in them. Academy students and post-graduated students have the opportunity to participate in competitions for scholarships and abroad internships. Students also have the opportunity during their summer holidays to work and travel the countries of Western Europe, USA. After March 2006 a reorganization of the International Department was made by merging it with the Preparatory Department for Foreigners. The Academy followed the principle: an engineer must possess computer technology knowledge and has to know a foreign language. In implementing this principle in practice, ZDIA created Linguistic Center, where students can improve their knowledge of English, German, or French, learn Italian and Spanish. Graduates trained in the linguistic centers have internships in universities of Germany, Finland, or Ireland to earn a master's degree. During the last 3 years the Academy has been collaborating with the National Committee of IAESTE, which organizes research and student exchanges, and includes 54 universities of Ukraine, operates under the aegis of the UN and brings together the national committees in 65 countries worldwide.

== Famous alumni ==
- Yuri Lagutin, Mikhail Ishchenko, Alexander Rezanov, Sergei Kushniruk and Alexander Shipenko − Olympic Champions.
- Valentina Lutaeva − member of handball team of the USSR − the winner of the Olympic Games in Montreal and Moscow.
- International Master of Sport Fencing Tatiana Chernyavskaya − world champion (1986), silver medalist of the World Student Games in Japan.
- Oleksandr Sin − Mayor of Zaporizhzhia
- Bastryga, Ivan Mikhailovich − General Director of Zaporizhzhia Aluminium Combine
- Fedotov, Alexander − Chairman of the Board of Zaporizhzhia Aluminium Combine

== Literature ==
- Запорізька область: природа, історія, архітектура, культура, економіка: Ілюстрована енциклопедія.- Запоріжжя: Дике поле, 2004. - 540 pp.
