= Dosifey =

Dosifey is a Russian-language form of the given name Dositheus. Notable people with the name include:

- Dosifey of Solovki (died after 1514), hegumen of the Solovetsky Monastery, hagiographer
- Dosifey of Kiev, also Dosifeya of Kiev, Orthodox saint, a woman cross-dressed in Kyiv Pechersk Lavra

== Fictional characters ==
- Dosifey, head of the schismatics (Old Believers) in the 1886 opera Khovanshchina and in the 1969 film Khovanshchina

== See also ==
- Dositej
- Feodosiy, a name with the reversed order of stems
