= Feodosiy =

Feodosiy or Feodosy (Russian: Феодосий) is a Russian-language form of the masculine given name Theodosius. The lay form of the name is Fedosey. Notable people with the name include:

- Feodosy Chernyshev
- Feodosiy Efremenkov, Russian former competitive figure skater
- Feodosy Krasovsky
- Feodosiy Petsyna, archbishop in the Ukrainian Orthodox Church
- Feodosiy of Kiev

== See also ==
- Dosifey, a name with the reversed order of stems
- Fedot
