= Dositheus =

Dositheus (/dəˈsɪθiəs/; Ancient Greek: Δωσίθεος, Dōsítheos) is a Greek masculine given name, and it may refer to:

- Dositheos (Samaritan) (fl. 1st century), Gnostic
- Dositheus Magister (fl. 4th century), Roman grammarian and jurist
- Dositheus of Gaza (fl. 6th century), monk and saint
- Dositheus of Constantinople (died after 1191), or Dositheus I of Jerusalem, Greek Orthodox Patriarch
- Dositheos II of Jerusalem (1641–1707), Greek Orthodox Patriarch of Jerusalem 1669–1707
- Dositheus of Tbilisi (died 1795), Georgian Orthodox archbishop
- Dositheus (Ivanchenko) (1884–1984), bishop of the Russian Orthodox Church, bishop of Brooklyn

== See also ==
- Dositej
- Dosifey
- Theodosius, a name with the reversed order of stems
