= Ivanchenko =

Ivanchenko (Ukrainian: Іванченко; Russian: Иванченко) is a surname. Notable people with the surname include:

- Aleksandr Ivanchenko (born 1945), Russian writer
- Dositheus (Ivanchenko) (1884–1984), bishop of the Russian Orthodox Church
- Gennady Ivanchenko (born 1947), Soviet weightlifter
- Ivan Ivanchenko (born 1998), Russian footballer
