= Theodote =

Theodote or Theodota (Greek: Θεοδότη, "divine gift") is the feminine form of Theodotus and may refer to:

- Theodote (courtesan), 5th-century BC courtesan in ancient Greece, mentioned in Memorabilia of Xenophon
- Theodota of Philippi (died 318), Greek harlot and Christian martyr
- Theodota of Nicaea (4th century), Christian woman martyred with her sons
- Theodota (concubine), concubine of the Lombard king Cunipert (r. 688–700), later a nun
- Theodota of Constantinople (died 735), Byzantine woman executed during the Byzantine Iconoclasm
- Theodote (empress), the second consort of the Byzantine emperor Constantine VI (r. 780–797)

Theodota or Theodote is also the Syriac masculine form of the name Theodotus and may refer to:

- Theodotus of Amida (died 698), Syrian Orthodox holy man

== See also ==
- Acraea theodote, a synonym of the butterfly Acraea andromacha
