= Vasyl Tarasenko =

Vasyl Tarasenko Василь Якимович Тарасенко

Representative of the Ukrainian SSR in the United Nations Security Council
- In office 1948–1949

Personal details
- Born: 18 April 1907 Sosnytsia
- Died: 2001 (aged 93–94) Kyiv
- Education: National Pedagogical Dragomanov University

Vasyl Tarasenko (Ukrainian: Василь Якимович Тарасенко; April 18, 1907, in Sosnytsia – 2001 in Kyiv) - he was Ukrainian diplomat. Doctor of History, Professor, Representative of the Ukrainian SSR in the United Nations Economic and Social Council, the United Nations Security Council.

== Education ==
Vasyl Tarasenko graduated from National Pedagogical Dragomanov University (1939)

== Professional career and experience ==
In 1939 - he was in teaching. From 1941 to 1943 - he participated in World War II. In 1943-1945 - he worked as Director of Zaporizhzhya Pedagogical Institute. Since May 1945 - he was Assistant Minister of Foreign Affairs of the Ukrainian SSR. From August 1945 to January 1946 - representative of the Ukrainian SSR of the European Committee for the Administration of relief and rehabilitation of the United Nations. From January to November 1946 - Representative of the Ukrainian SSR in the Economic and Social Council of the United Nations. In 1946-1948 - Advisor to the Soviet Embassy in the United States. He was a member delegation of Ukraine at the United Nations, since 1948 - Head of the Delegation of Ukraine at the United Nations. In 1948-1949 - Representative of the Ukrainian SSR in the UN Security Council. He was Deputy Minister of Foreign Affairs of the Ukrainian SSR. From 1950 to 1984 - was the Head of the Department of Modern History Taras Shevchenko National University of Kyiv. Professor.

== Diplomatic rank ==
- Ambassador Extraordinary and Plenipotentiary.
