= Plutei of Theodota =

8th-century Lombard sculptures

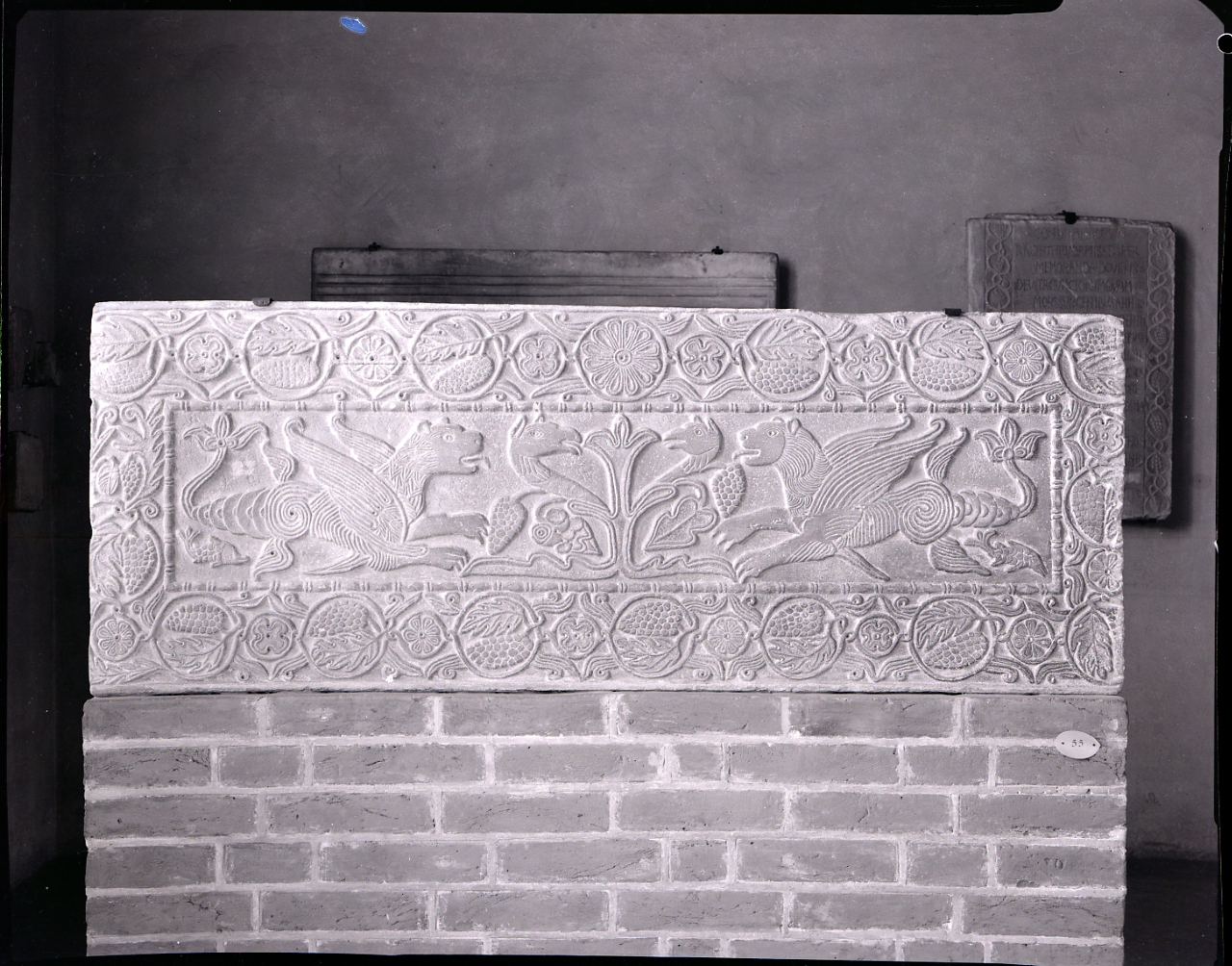
Plutei of Theodota

The Plutei of Theodota are two mid 8th-century Lombard marble bas-reliefs or plutei from the oratory of San Michele alla Pusterla in Italy. They are now held in the Civic Museums of Pavia. Naturalistic in style, they were produced during the Liutprandean Renaissance. One shows the Tree of Life between two griffins and the other shows a cross and font between two peacocks.

They are named after Theodota, a Byzantine noblewoman who became the lover of king Cunipert (688–700), who later placed her in the Santa Maria Teodote monastery, also known as Santa Maria della Pusterla (now the Diocesan Seminary for Pavia), near which was later built the oratorio di San Michele.
