= Monastery of Santa Maria Teodote =

Monastery in Pavia, Italy

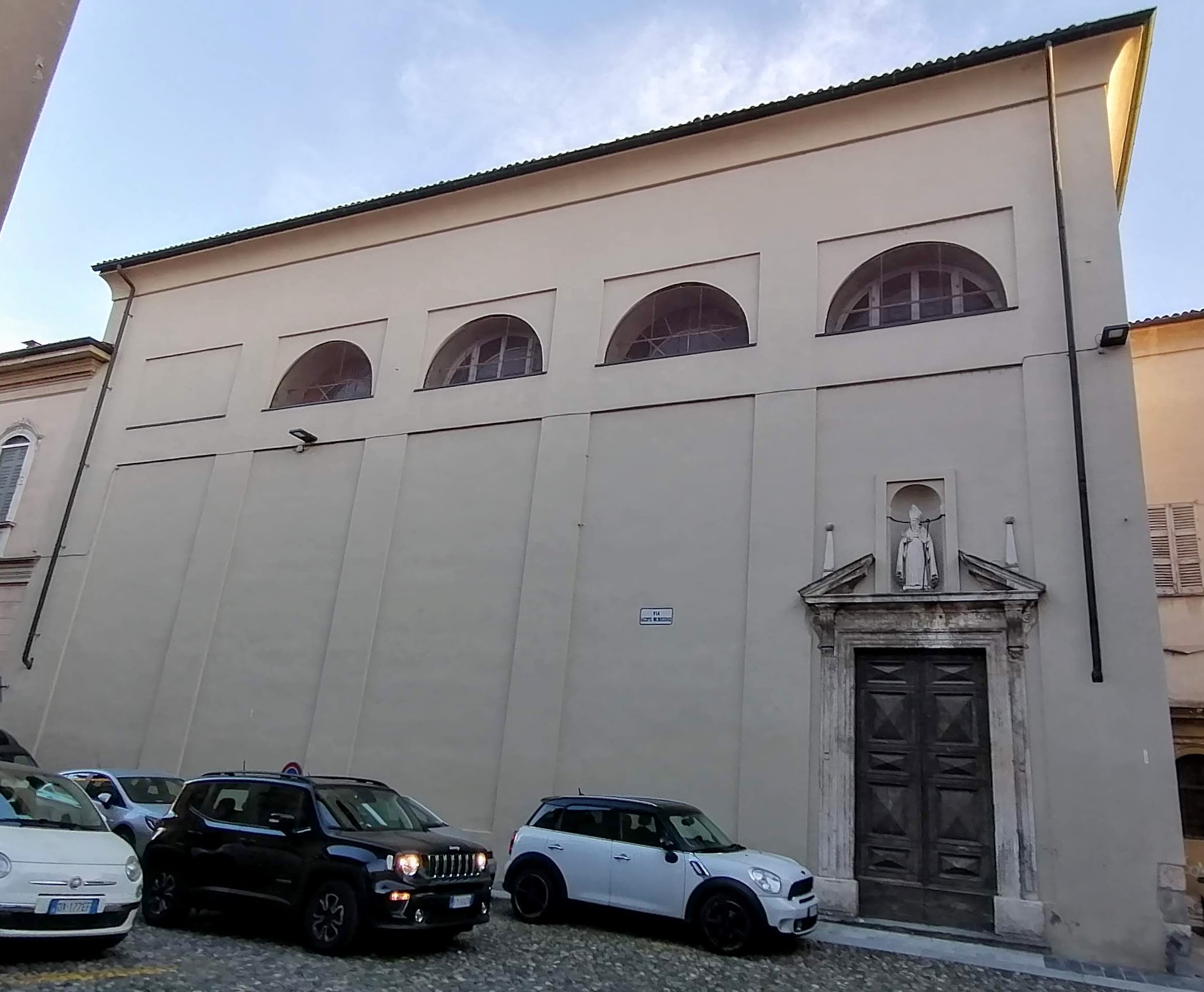
- The church of Saint Andrew. .

Religion
- Affiliation: Catholic
- Province: Pavia
- Year consecrated: 679-700
- Status: Active

Location
- Location: Pavia, Italy
- Interactive map of Monastery of Santa Maria Teodote

Architecture
- Type: Church

The monastery of Santa Maria Teodote, also known as Santa Maria della Pusterla, was one of the oldest and most important female monasteries in Pavia, Lombardy, now Italy. Founded in the seventh century, it stood in the place where the diocesan seminary is located and was suppressed in the eighteenth century.

== History ==
It was founded in the seventh century, during the reign of the Lombard king Cunipert between 679 and 700 by the noble Gregorius and housed a chapel (or oratory) dedicated to Saint Michael (demolished in 1867, whose remains were object of an archaeological investigation in the 1970s). From the Lombard oratory, lost like the entire early medieval complex, come the Plutei of Theodota (now preserved in the Pavia Civic Museums), among the highest specimens of Lombard sculpture to have survived to this day. The monastery was called "della Pusterla" due to the proximity of a small city gate or "di Theodota" because it hosted Theodota.

The monastery received numerous imperial donations and diplomas confirming its possessions from the emperors Lothair I (833, 834, 839, 841), Louis the German (871), Carloman of Bavaria (876), Charles the Fat (880), Arnulf of Carinthia (895), Louis the Blind (901), Berengar I, Hugh of Italy, Otto I, Otto III, Henry II and Frederick I. In the imperial diploma of Otto III of 1 August 996 it appears that the monastery owned lands in Lomellina and fishing rights on the Po. In the 12th-13th centuries the main properties of the monastery were concentrated in Fidenza (about 550 hectares), around Voghera (about 150 hectares) and Zenevredo, a place where the monastery held stately rights and majority shares in the local castle. The monastery, which became an abbey and welcomed the Benedictine reform towards the ninth century as for the others, in 1473 was joined to the Cassinese Congregation. In 1778, 43 nuns lived there, but in 1799, like the other great monasteries of the city, it was suppressed by the institutions of the Cisalpine Republic and its assets confiscated, while the archive of the institution was deposited with the State Archives of Milan. Unlike the other monasteries, however, it soon returned to a religious use, as in 1868 the episcopal seminary, which still has its seat there, was located there.

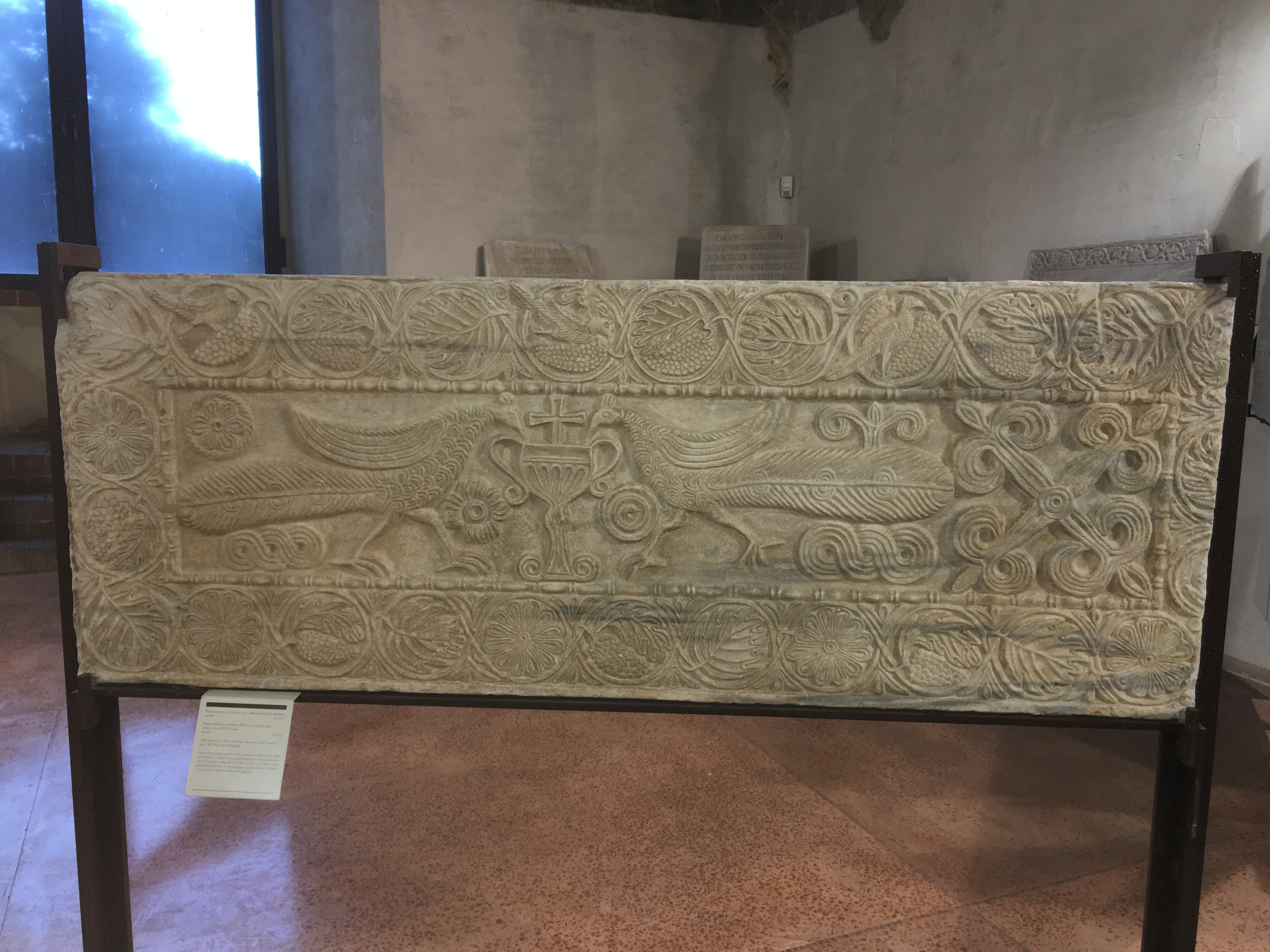
Plutei of Theodota with peacocks from the oratory of San Michele alla Pusterla, early 8th century, Pavia Civic Museums.

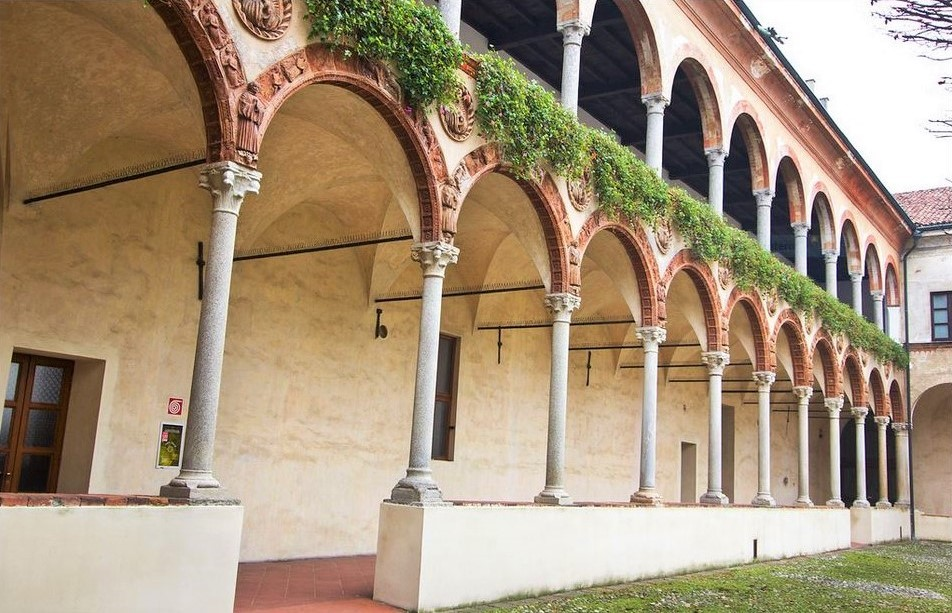
The Renaissance cloister.

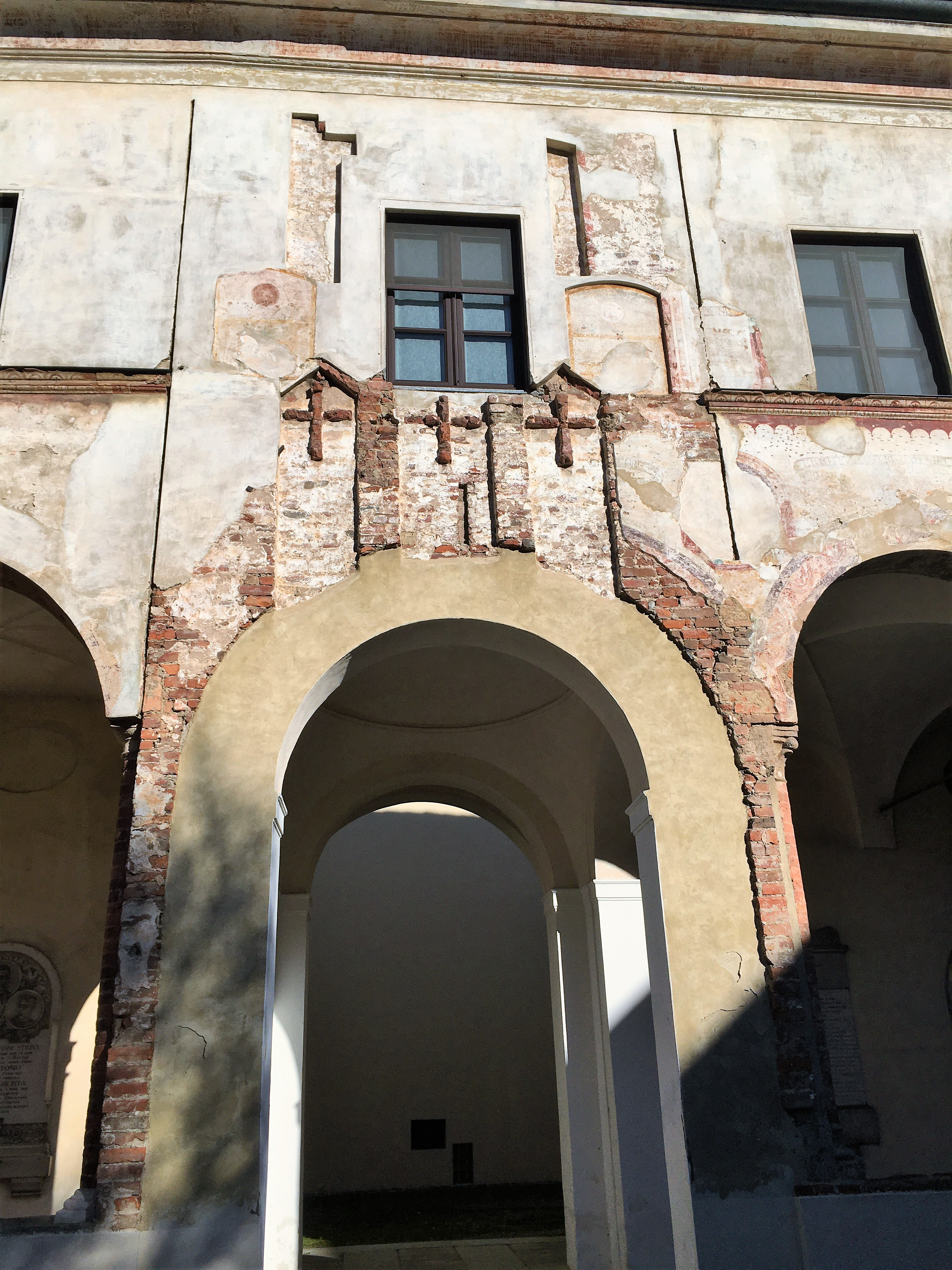
Remains of the Lombard bell tower incorporated in the Renaissance cloister.

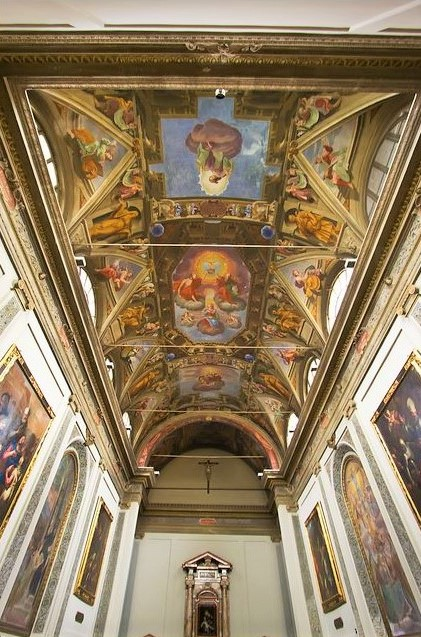
The interior of the church.

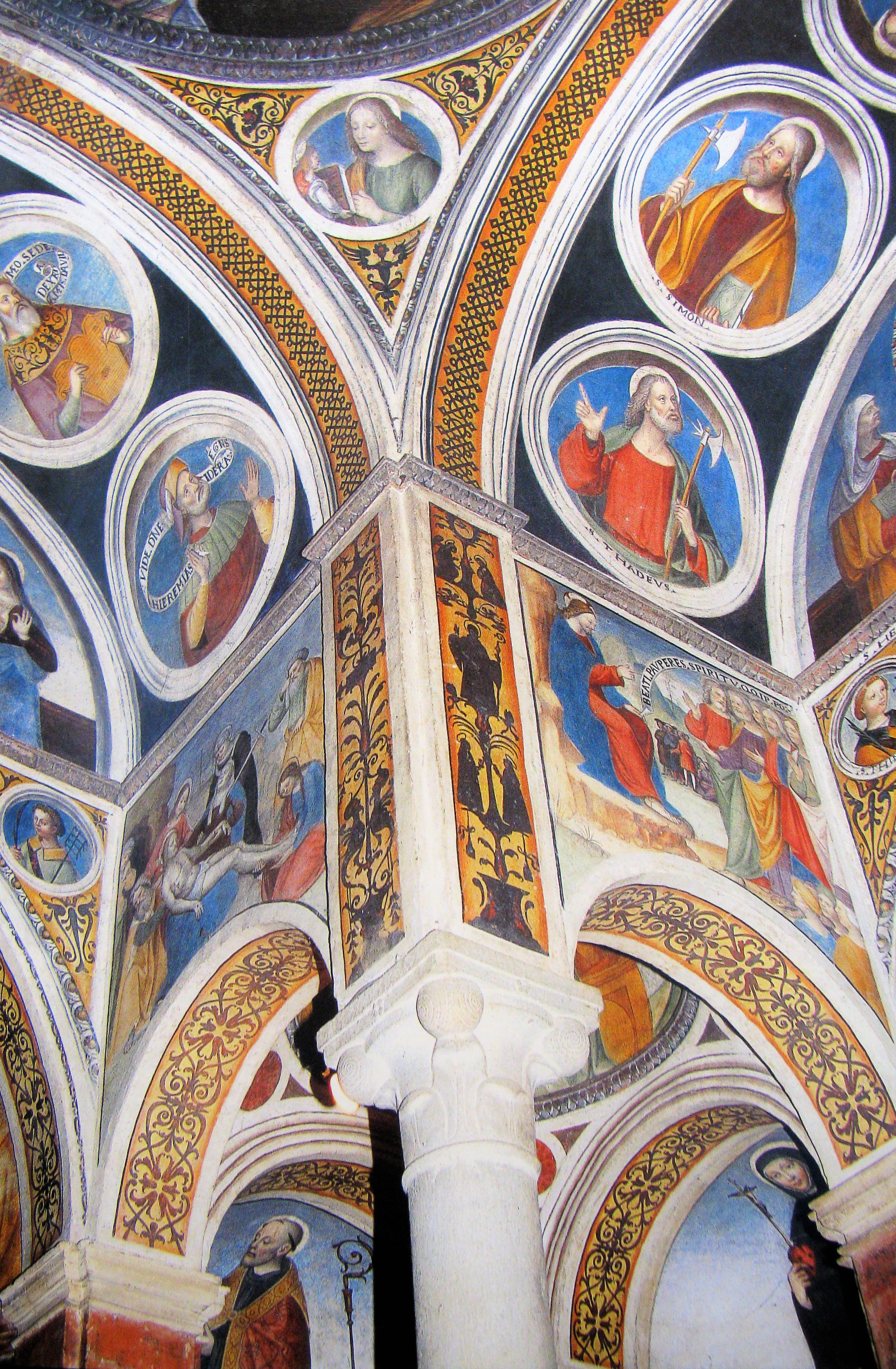
The Chapel of San Salvatore.

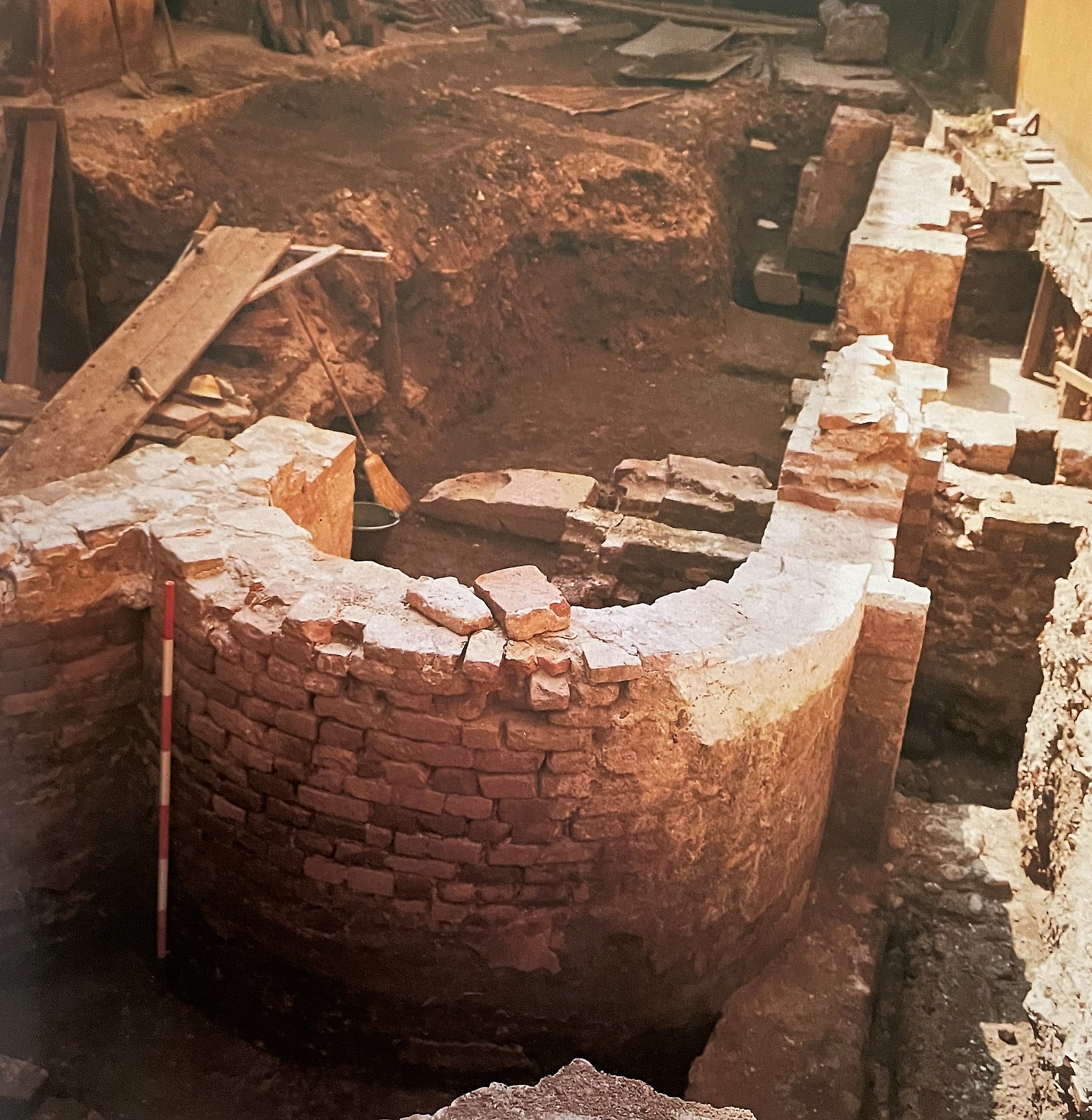
The remains of the oratory of San Michele alla Pusterla of the Lombard age brought to light during the excavations of 1970 and now buried again.

== Architecture ==
The monastery was almost entirely rebuilt in the fifteenth century in Gothic and Renaissance forms and of the previous Lombard age complex, only some elements incorporated in subsequent constructions remain.

Inside, the large fifteenth-century cloister with slender arches full of breath, supported by marble columns, is preserved. The ferrules of the southern arches are covered with terracotta tiles bearing figures of cherubs, perhaps made to a design by Giovanni Antonio Amadeo. Between one arch and another, busts of praying monks stand out in rounds on a shell-like background. On the western side of the cloister it looks like a gothic portal in terracotta with very rich friezes depicting cherubs and bunches of grapes inserted in a foliage motif. Under the portico on the south side there is a fresco by Bernardino de 'Rossi signed and dated to 1491, while the eastern façade preserves other fifteenth-century frescoes. On the upper floor of the south side there is a fourteenth-century loggia. Traces of frescoes from the 15th and 16th centuries have appeared on the other sides, which also cover arches and sub-arches. In the northern part of the cloister you can see, inserted in the masonry, the remains of the massive bell tower (dating back to the Lombard age) of the oratory of San Michele alla Pusterla, characterized (in the surviving portion) by decorations with brick crosses in relief.

The east side of the cloister gives access to the small church of the Savior, also from the 15th century, with a Greek cross, with central and corner domes, covered like the walls with frescoes by Bernardino Lanzani. The name of the designer of the small church of the Savior is not known, certainly it must have been an architect influenced by the stylistic innovations introduced in Lombardy by Bramante in the 1480s, as can be seen from the central plan of the building. The chapel, with five domes, a typically Byzantine detail, perhaps influenced by the institution's dependence on the Paduan congregation, is articulated around four columns, while below, there is a crypt that reproduces the same plant. The chapel is almost entirely decorated with frescoes made between 1506 and 1507 by Bernardino Lanzani and his pupils. Originally, the building probably housed the large crucifix in silver foil, commissioned between 963 and 965 by the Abbess Raingarda and now preserved in the left transept of the basilica of San Michele. The main church of the monastery, formerly dedicated to the Virgin and now to Saint Andrew, was rebuilt in 1604, and is adorned with frescoes and stuccos. The fresco on the right as you enter is the work of Luigi Scaramuccia from Perugia, and represents the Crucifix among a group of nuns. The fresco opposite, with Theodota presenting the model of the church in Saint Benedict, is by Filippo Abbiati. The frescoes on the vault are also valuable.

== See also ==
- Late medieval domes
