= Zaporizhzhia strikes (2022–present) =

Battle in Ukraine

Coordinates: 47°51′00″N 35°07′03″E

- Part of the Southern Ukraine campaign of the Russian invasion of Ukraine
Date	24 February 2022 – present (4 years, 8 months and 6 days)
Location	Zaporizhzhia, Zaporizhzhia Oblast, Ukraine
Status	Ongoing

Belligerents
Russia	Ukraine

Units involved
Russian Armed Forces	Armed Forces of Ukraine

Casualties and losses
Unknown	Unknown
- At least 3400 civilians wounded and 812 of Zaporozhia region are killed.

From 27 February 2022, as part of the Russo-Ukrainian war (2022–present), the Zaporizhzhia Oblast has been repeatedly hit by Russian munitions as part of the Southern Ukraine campaign. In the administrative centre of Zaporizhzhia, significant proportions of civilian infrastructure and housing have been damaged or destroyed. In a report dated 24 February 2026, the Zaporizhzhia Regional Military Administration reports that 812 residents of the region have been killed, including 45 children. It also reports that more than 3,400 people have been injured. Strikes continue to occur on a regular basis, sometimes numbering in hundreds or thousands of munitions per day.

== Background ==
Ukraine was invaded by the Russian armed forces on 24 February 2022 with the Russian 22nd Army Corps advancing north from Crimea towards the city of Zaporizhzhia, which holds a strategic position along the Dnieper River in Central Ukraine, and is the administrative centre of the Zaporizhzhia Oblast. By 26 February, Russian forces began to approach the Zaporizhzhia Nuclear Power Plant, with fighting between Ukrainian and Russian troops being reported on the southern outskirts of the city the following day. No casualties were reported in the aftermath of the confrontation. Later that evening, the Russians began shelling the city for the first time since the start of the war.

On 24 February, Russia shelled the Zaporizhzhia airport. On February 26, it destroyed the trolleybus depot, and on February 27, battles were focused on the southern outskirts of the city; there were no victims.

== Timeline ==
=== 2022 ===
==== March ====
The Zaporizhzhia Nuclear Power Plant was subjected to Russian shelling during the night of 3 March, resulting in a fire at the plant which was brought under control by the next morning. That same day, the plant fell under control of the Russian forces following the Battle of Enerhodar.

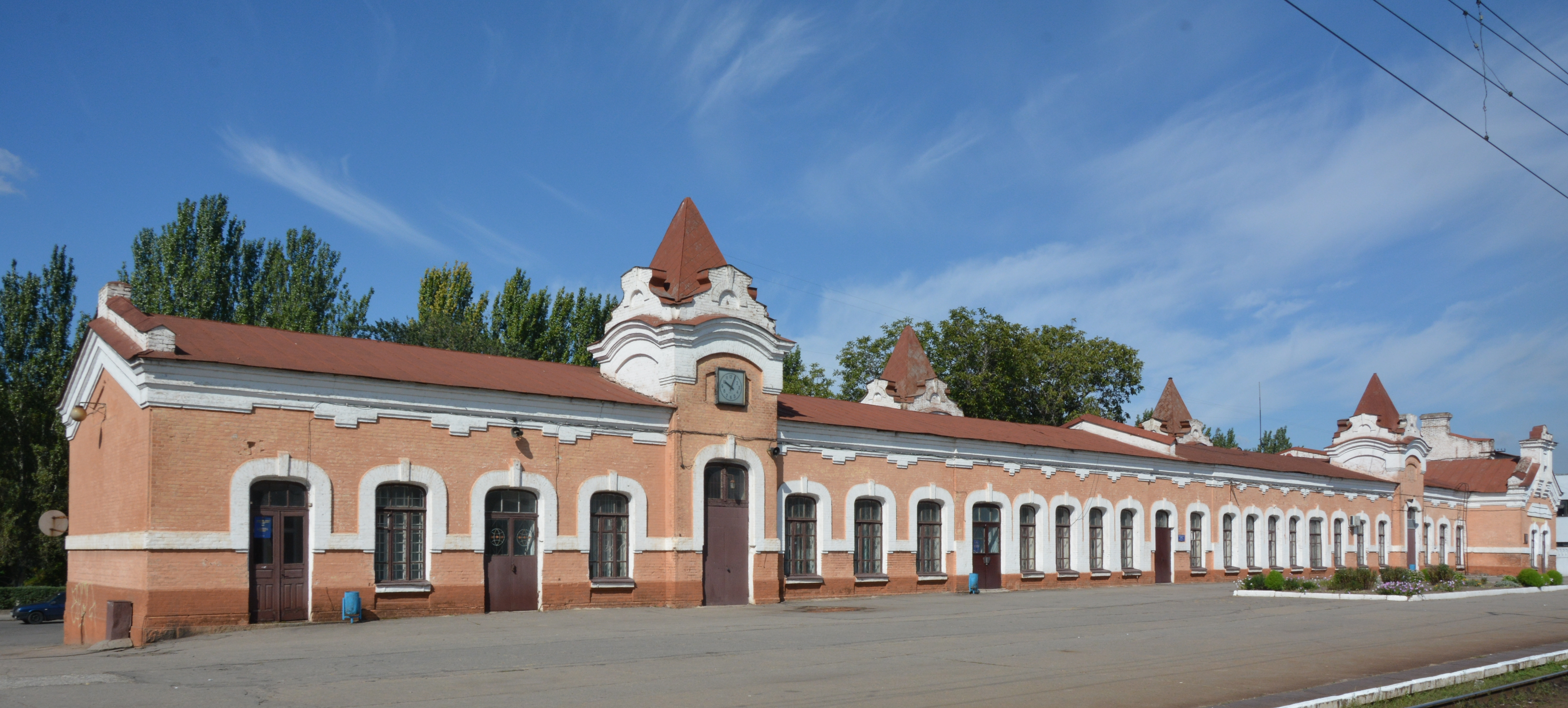
View from the platform of the Zaporizhzhia-2 railway station

Around 5 am on 16 March, the Zaporizhzhia-2 railway station (Запоріжжя II) was targeted by a Russian rocket attack, significantly damaging the tracks and overhead lines, as well as blowing out the building's windows. The trains which were present at the station at the time also sustained broken windows. No one was injured or killed in the attack, and all train traffic was subsequently handled by Zaporizhzhia-1 railway station. According to governor Oleksandr Starukh, this was the first time a civilian target had been attacked in the city of Zaporizhzhia, where thousands of refugees from Mariupol were taking shelter.

==== April ====
Residents reported feeling and hearing explosions in various parts of the city on 7 April. These explosions had been the result of the Zaporizhzhia air defense forces successfully shooting down three Russian cruise missiles, preventing any potential ground casualties and/or injuries.

On 21 April, two Russian cruise missiles were fired towards Zaporizhzhia. The first missile came down near the island of Khortytsia in the vicinity of the Preobrazhensky Bridges (Preobrazhensky Bridge) at 12:45 pm. At that time, a passenger train serving the line between Zaporizhzhia and Lviv was travelling on the tracks of the bridge and was caught in the blast. The windows of four carriages were blown out as a result of the explosion's shock wave. The second missile also came down near Khortytsia at 1:30 pm, resulting in damage to a Sanatorium (Sanatoriy-Profilaktoriy Ztr) building on the island. The attacks resulted in eight injuries, all of whom were civilians.

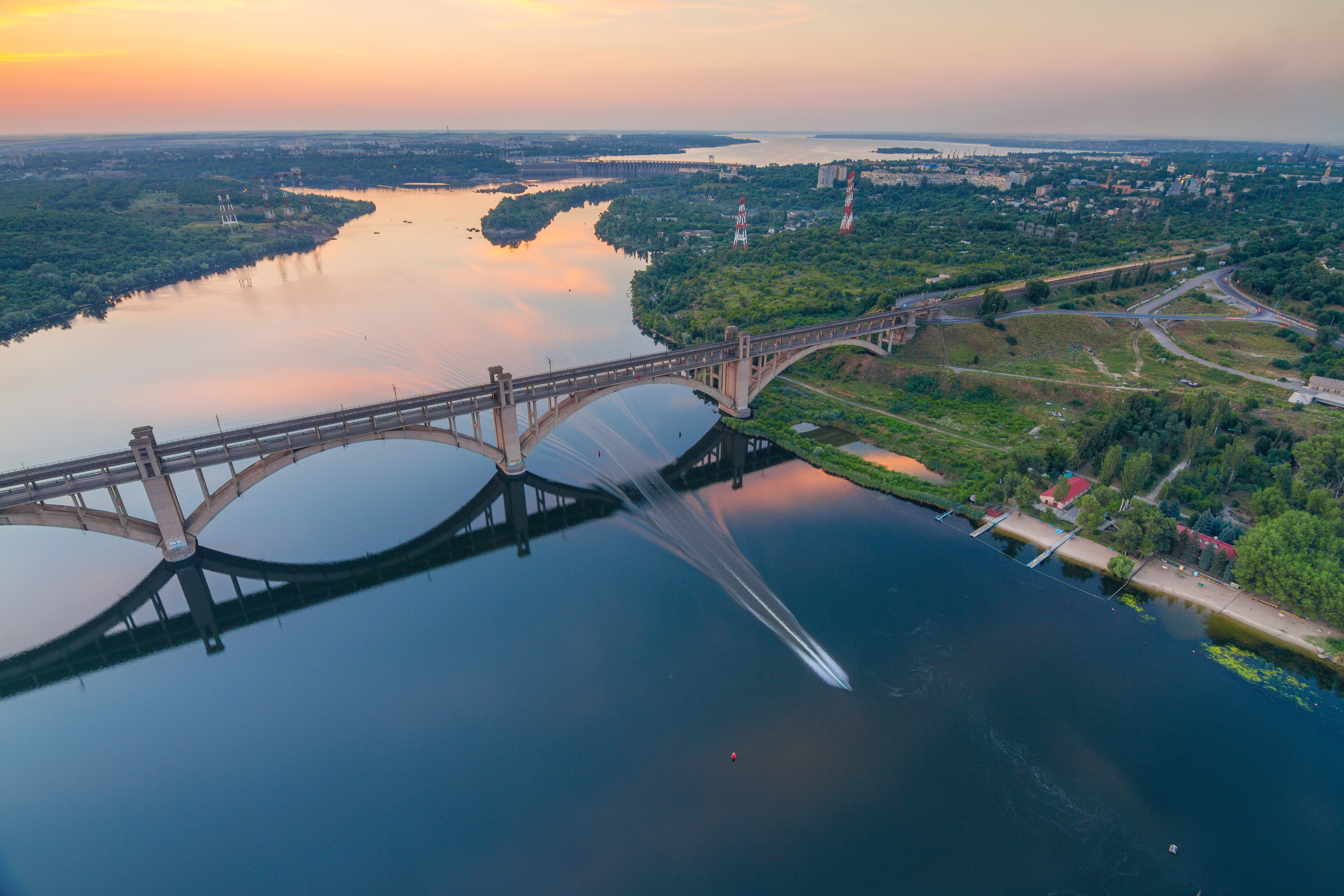
Preobrazhensky Bridges over the Dnieper River

In the morning of 26 April, two Russian 3M-54 Kalibr guided missiles hit the city, while a third missile exploded mid-air. The missile strike caused damage to a factory, which had been out of operation and killed one civilian while injuring three others. Two days later on the morning of 28 April, another missile strike was conducted on the city by a Kh-55 air-to-surface missile. The strike destroyed two private residences resulting in three casualties. On April 28, Russian troops launched air strikes on Zaporizhzhia.

==== May ====
At 11 pm on 12 May, a Russian cruise missile hit the island of Khortytsia, causing a small fire at the impact site. No infrastructure damage or casualties were reported.

Four more cruise missiles were launched at Zaporizhzhia on 25 May. While one missile was shot down by the city's air defenses, the other three struck civilian sites in the Shevchenkivskyi district and the shopping centre in the Oleksandrivskyi district, resulting in one civilian death and three wounded.

==== July ====
On 13 July, two Russian cruise missiles hit a factory in the Dnipro district (Dniprovskyi District, Zaporizhzhia) of the city, wounding 14 civilians.

==== August ====
On 6 August, explosions were reported near the Zaporizhzhia Nuclear Power Plant from apparent shelling. A high-voltage power line transformer was damaged in the explosion, resulting in the automatic shutdown of reactor number 3 and the start-up of its emergency generators.

One civilian was killed and two others injured when five Russian shells were fired at Zaporizhzhia at 7:15 pm on 12 August. Further city infrastructure in the Shevchenkivskyi district was also damaged in the shelling. On August 29, 40 private houses and nine high-rise buildings were destroyed in Zaporizhzhia.

==== September ====
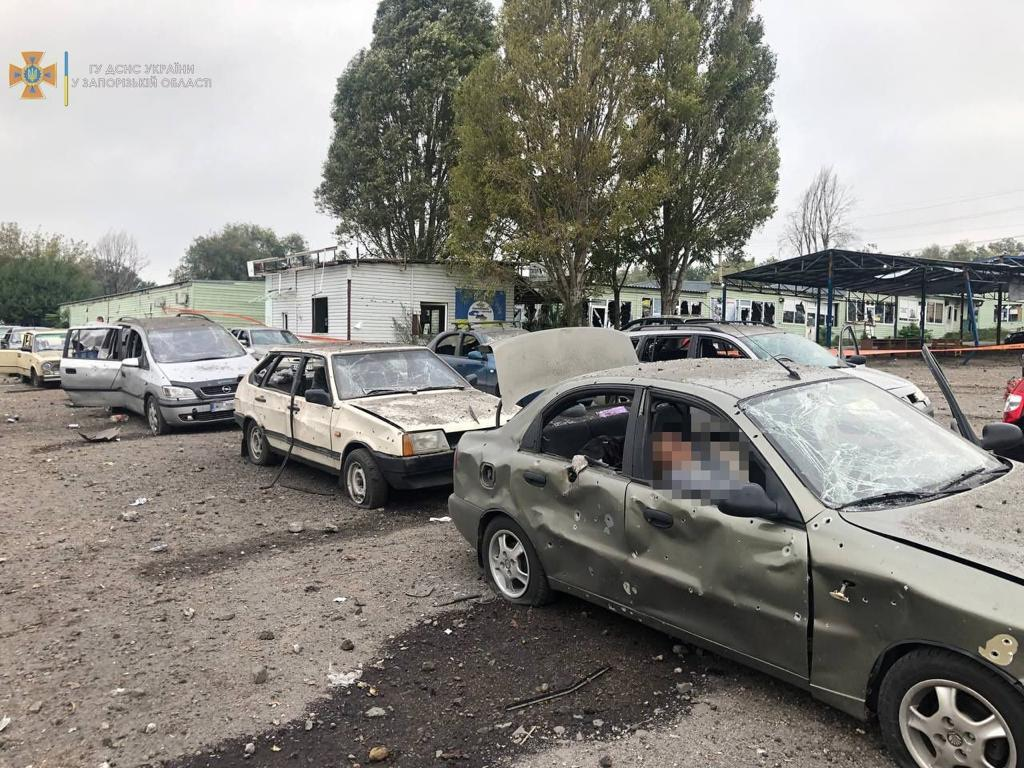
Damaged vehicles alongside the victims of the missile strike of 30 September

During the night of 19 September, Zaporizhzhia was hit by eight Russian rockets in its industrial and residential areas. Followed by another rocket attack in the morning, striking the regional centre near the Dnieper river. Two days later, the city was again hit by two Russian rockets during the night, followed by another five rockets attacks in the daytime. The regional centre was hit an additional two times, while other infrastructure and residential houses were damaged, two of the projectiles landed in a field on the outskirts of the city. The attack wounded three civilians. The following day on 22 September, nine more rockets were fired at the city. One of the projectiles hit a hotel in the city's central park, killing one civilian and injuring five others. An electrical substation and several high-rise residential buildings were also damaged. Later that same day, ten more rockets struck the city and damaged about a dozen private homes. Further shelling on the morning of 24 September saw five projectiles hit the city, causing damage to residential buildings as well as injuring nine civilians and killing one.

On the morning of 27 September, Zaporizhzhia was struck by 10 S-300 missiles. Besides damaging infrastructure, the attack also damaged power lines resulting in a fire.

A civilian humanitarian convoy was hit by several Russian S-300 missiles on 30 September, killing 32 civilians and wounding around 90 others.

==== October ====
At 5:08 am on 6 October, seven Russian rockets were fired towards the city centre of Zaporizhzhia. Several residential buildings were destroyed and fires broke out due to the attack, killing 17 civilians and injuring 12 more.

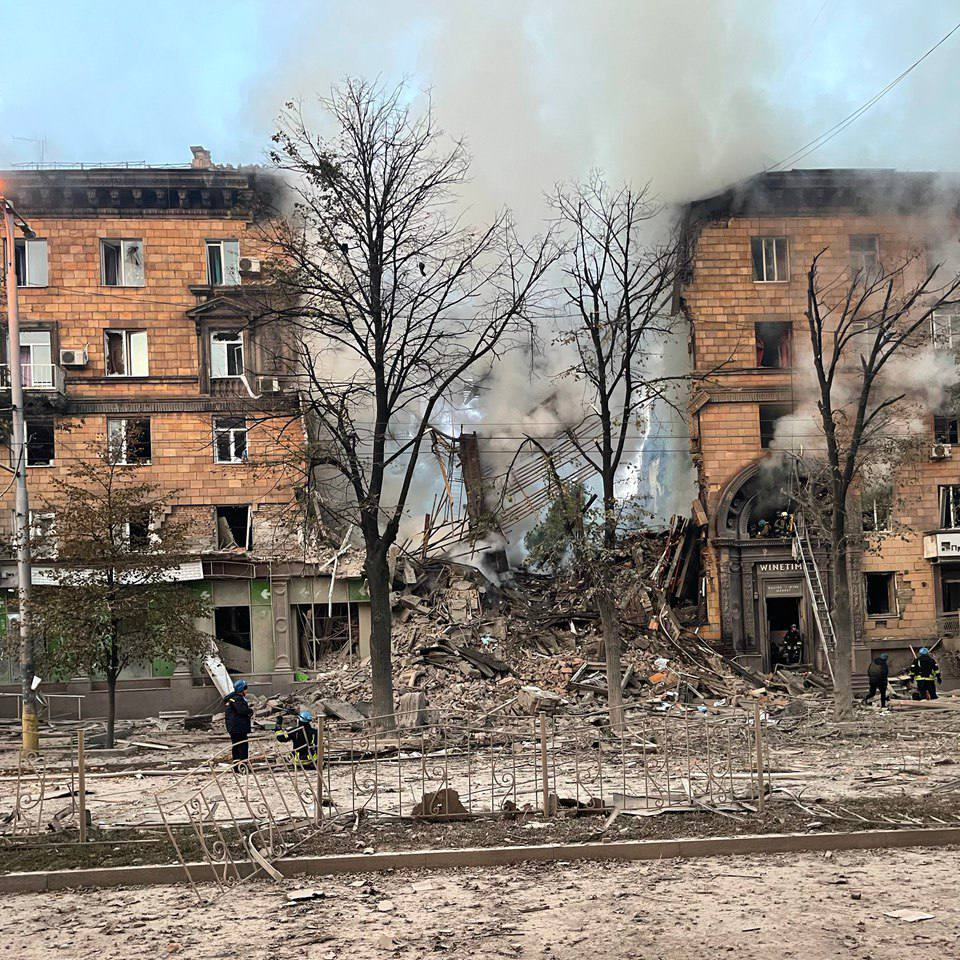
Houses after the shelling of 6 October

Zaporizhzhia was attacked once more during the night of 7 October, but this time by Iranian Shahed-136 kamikaze drones used by the Russian forces. The attack resulted in the deaths of 12 civilians with a further 13 injured and 15 missing. That same day around 10 am, another Russian attack struck the city with one of the rockets landing in the courtyard of a high-rise building. The attack damaged the building and injured one civilian.

Around 3 am on 9 October, 12 Russian tactical missiles were launched against civilian infrastructure in Zaporizhzhia. Most missiles hit both high-rise buildings and residential houses, with a nine-story building being partially destroyed after the attack. A further five high-rise buildings, 20 residential houses and four schools were damaged alongside 20 cars. A total of 13 civilians were killed in the attack, while 89 more were injured.

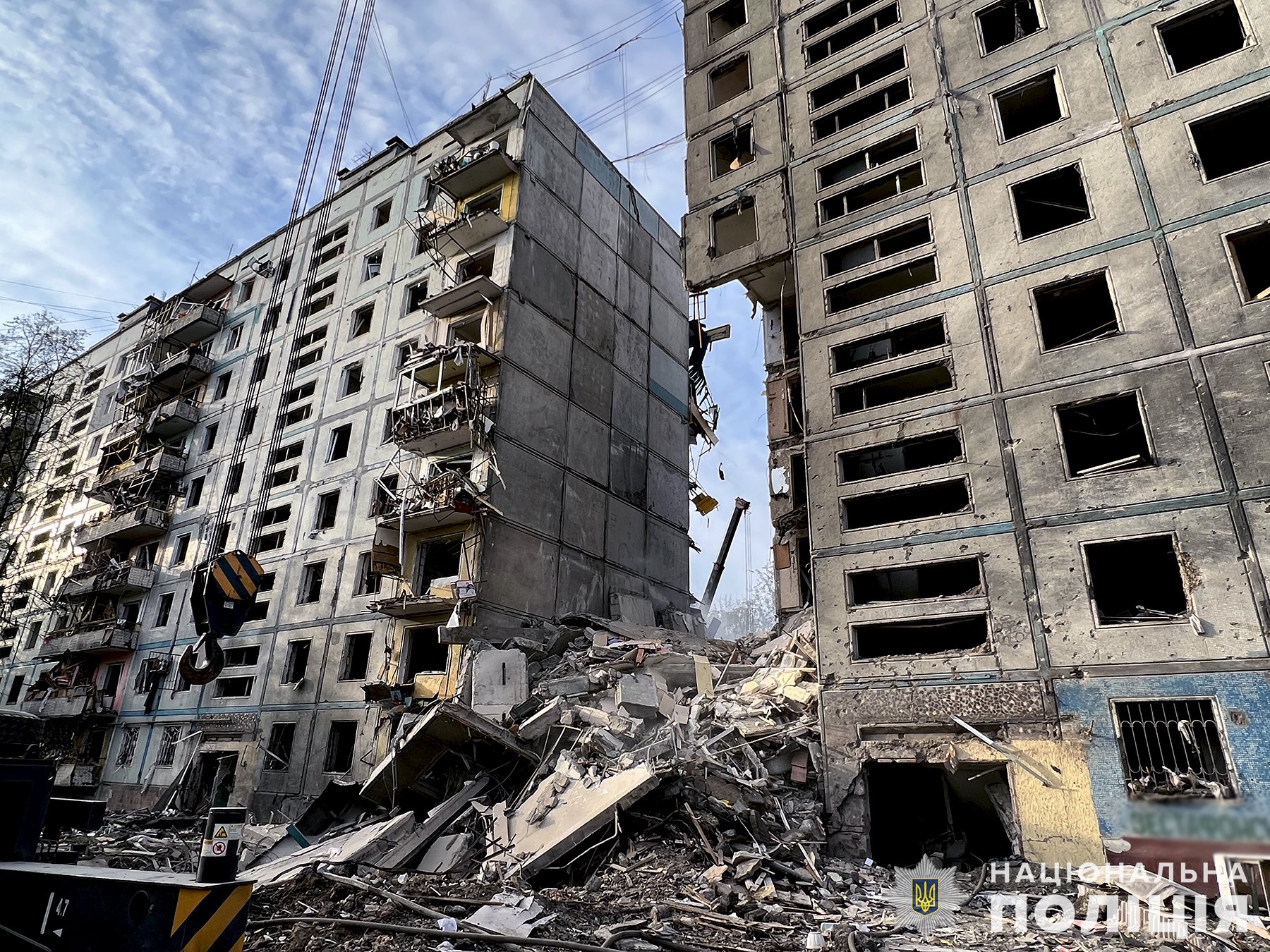
Damage to a residential building in Zaporizhzhia following the airstrike of 9 October

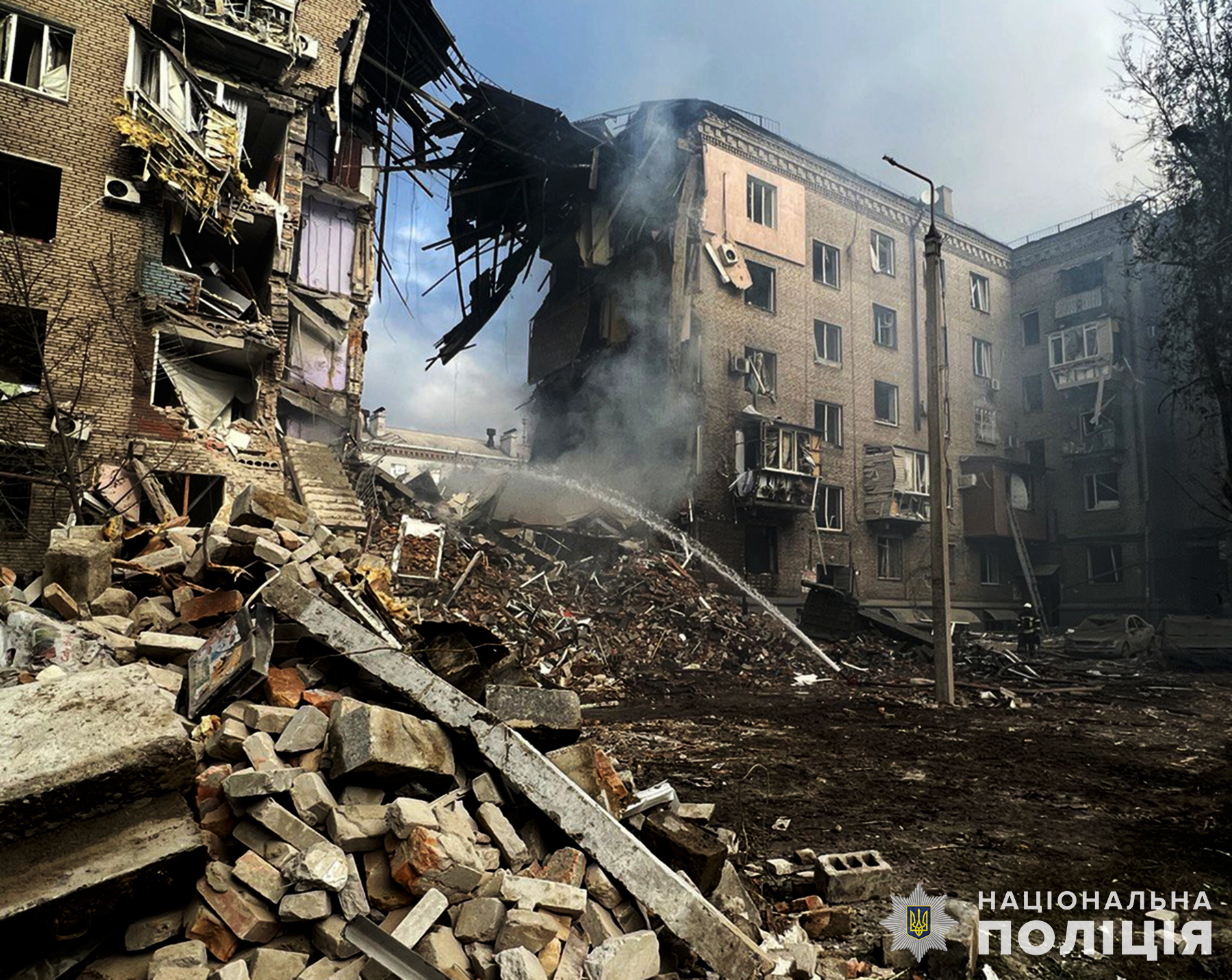
A residential building after the airstrike of 10 October

The following day at 1:45 am, about seven Russian S-300 anti-aircraft missiles struck the city resulting in the deaths of eight civilians.

Russian forces continuously targeted Zaporizhzhia with about 19 S-300 missiles and four Shahed-136 kamikaze drones during the nights from 11 to 15 October. Many residential buildings were damaged alongside other city infrastructure and several cars. The human cost of the continuous attacks came down to one civilian casualty and three more wounded.

Another string of attacks occurred during the nights from 17 to 19 October, seeing at least seven S-300 missiles hitting both civilian and industrial infrastructure and several kamikaze drones hitting the regional centre. No deaths or injuries were reported. Two days later on 21 October at around 8.30am, another six Russian S-300 missiles targeted the city, damaging more residential buildings as well as a school. Five civilians received injuries in the attack.

On 31 October around 8am, several rockets were launched from a Russian aircraft, followed by another attack by Russian S-300 missiles at 10 am. The city's infrastructure again received damage, including damage to several high-rise buildings, a hospital, a school and a cultural centre. As a result of the shelling, many of the city's residents were left without electricity or running water.

==== November ====
On 6 November around 12:34 am, two S-300 missiles were fired at the city's regional centre. One of the missiles fell in a residential quarter, damaging private residences as well as two cars, and causing a fire. The other exploded in a privately owned field. One person was killed by the shelling.

On 18 November at 10:35 pm, five S-300 missiles were launched at Zaporizhzhia. The attack damaged a factory and several high-rise buildings, killing one person. In the aftermath of the attack, over 120 residential buildings were left without heating. The heating issue was resolved in the stricken high-rise buildings by the following day.

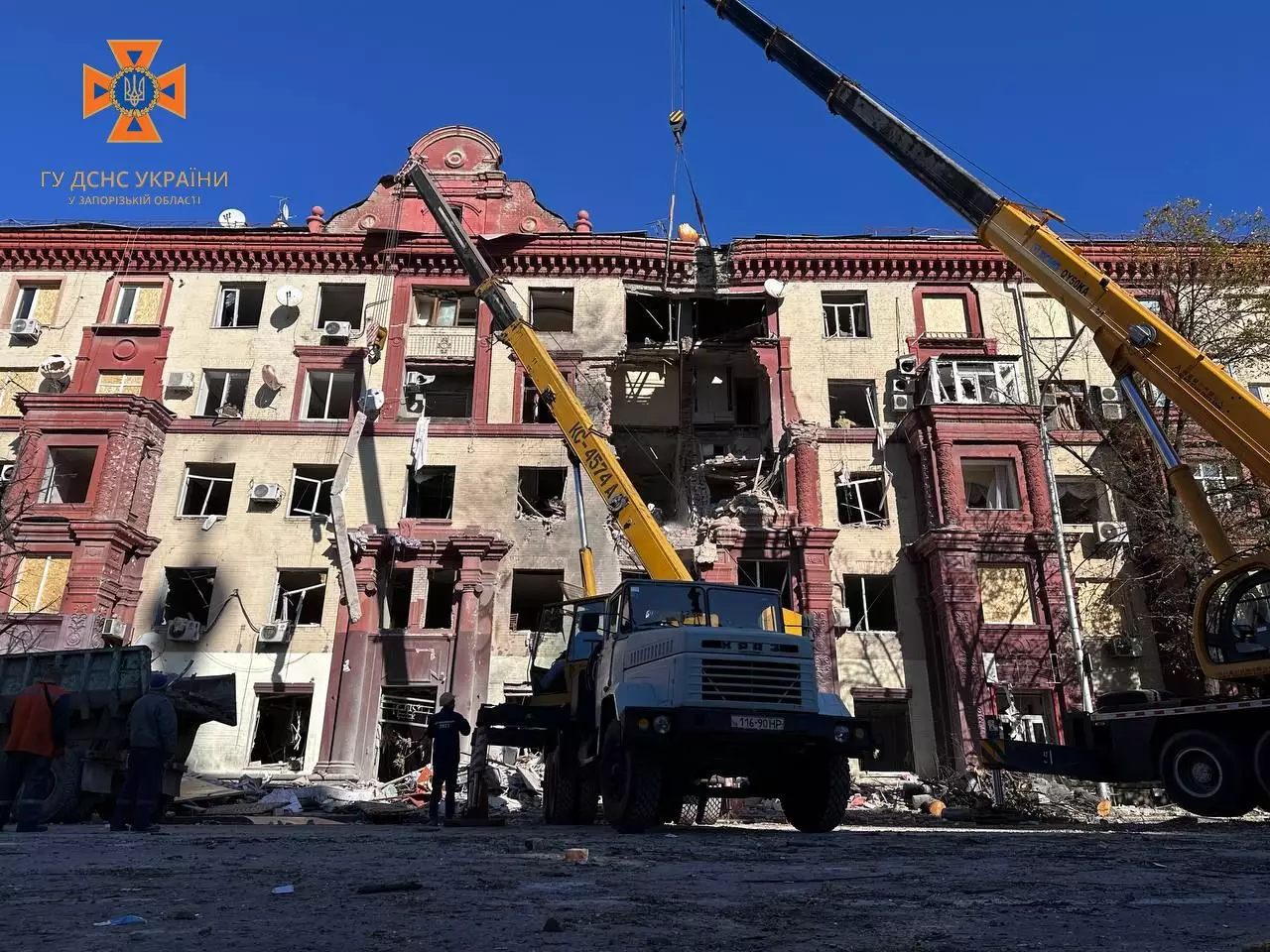
Residential building in Zaporizhzhia after the attack on 18 October 2023

=== 2023 ===
==== March ====
On 22 March, Zaporizhzhia was shelled by Russian troops. Two buildings were destroyed, one person was killed.

==== October ====
On 18 October, a Russian missile attack partially destroyed a residential building in Zaporizhzhia. Five people were killed and five others were injured.

== 2026 ==
=== June ===
On 2 June, Zaporizhzhia was subjected to a massive attack by missiles and drones. As a result of the shelling, critical and industrial infrastructure facilities, private houses, and apartment buildings were damaged in the city. Around 7 pm, a Russian FPV drone attacked the administration of the Kosmichnyi district in Zaporizhzhia, exploding near the entrance to the building, which damaged the facade and shattered windows.

Another attack occurred on June 3, during a fire extinguishing operation by rescuers, following an enemy drone attack on a gas station, the occupiers launched a second targeted strike. In the evening, in the Pivdennyi microdistrict, the occupiers struck a nine-story building with a loitering munition, which pierced straight through a reinforced concrete panel, damaging balconies and shattering windows.

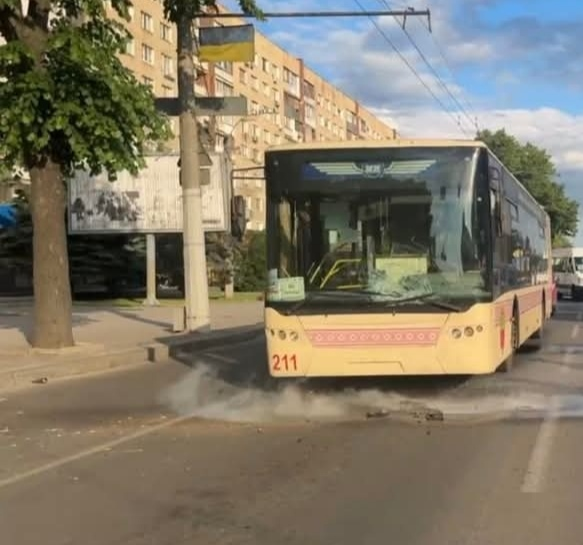
Trolleybus damaged by an FPV drone on Sobornyi Avenue on June 4, 2026

On June 4, Zaporizhzhia was under a massive attack by enemy drones for many hours, namely Shaheds, Molniyas, and FPV drones. Several locations in the city within the Oleksandrivskyi and Voznesenivskyi districts were attacked. In the Shevchenkivskyi district, one woman was killed and 16 people were injured as a result of the shelling. An apartment building, cars, and shops were damaged. Around 6 pm, an enemy FPV drone hit a LAZ E183D1 trolleybus (No. 211) while it was moving along Sobornyi Avenue. As a result of the attack, the trolleybus's windshield was damaged, but the passengers and driver managed to escape injury.

On 5 June, as a result of enemy strikes in Zaporizhzhia, 29 private houses in the Kosmichnyi district sustained damage. In the evening, Russian occupation forces launched a strike on a gas station in the Kosmichnyi district of Zaporizhzhia. Two civilians were injured in the attack.

On 6 June, Russian occupiers attacked Zaporizhzhia using UAVs. As a result of the shelling, two people were killed and seven were injured. Destruction was caused to critical and industrial infrastructure facilities, and a fire broke out at a parking lot near a residential building. Around 14:35–15:12, the occupiers attacked the city with strike UAVs. As a result of the attack, three people were injured, including a 10-year-old boy, and the premises of a supermarket, an educational institution, and apartment buildings in various districts of the city were damaged.

Around 14:40, on June 8, Russian occupiers attacked a route taxi (marshrutka) with a drone in the city's Pivdennyi microdistrict. As a result of the UAV attack on the route taxi, one person was injured, and the vehicle sustained significant damage. On the same day, the occupiers directed a "Shahed" type UAV at a public transport stop and commercial kiosks in the Khortytskyi district. Another drone struck a private residential house. Two women were killed, and 25 people were injured, six of whom were children. It later became known that the number of injured had risen to 32 people, with seven victims in serious condition and 12 wounded, including four children, remaining in hospitals.

June 11, in the Shevchenkivskyi district, 8 private houses were damaged as a result of enemy shelling. Windows and roofs in residential homes were damaged by the blast wave and debris.

June 12, the occupiers repeatedly attacked Zaporizhzhia with strike UAVs. In the morning, the "Epicentr" shopping centre in the Kosmichnyi district came under attack. As a result of the explosion, a woman was injured, and cars parked next to the shopping centre were also damaged. During the day, a Russian UAV damaged a terminal of the logistics operator "Nova Post". A fire broke out inside the premises. In addition, an enemy drone hit a residential area in Zaporizhzhia, damaging a residential house and outbuildings. In the evening, an enemy FPV drone flew into a 13th-floor balcony of an apartment building in the Kosmichnyi district, partially destroying the balcony; there were no casualties.

June 16, around 23:00, the occupiers launched five strikes with "Shahed" type UAVs on Zaporizhzhia. As a result of the attack, one person was killed and 7 others were injured. Fires broke out in residential areas and a shopping centre in the city, damaging residential houses and the main building of Zaporizhzhia National University. Nine residential houses and non-residential buildings were damaged in the Oleksandrivskyi and Kosmichnyi districts, including five apartment buildings and four houses in the private sector. Windows were blown out and roofs were damaged by the blast wave.

On June 17, during the day, an enemy drone attack triggered a fire in an open area in the Pivdennyi microdistrict. There was no destruction or casualties.

On the night of June 18, the enemy launched a strike on one of the districts of the regional centre. As a result of the hit, a fire broke out on the territory of a gas station—a building and equipment caught fire. Rescuers promptly extinguished the fire over an area of 15 m².

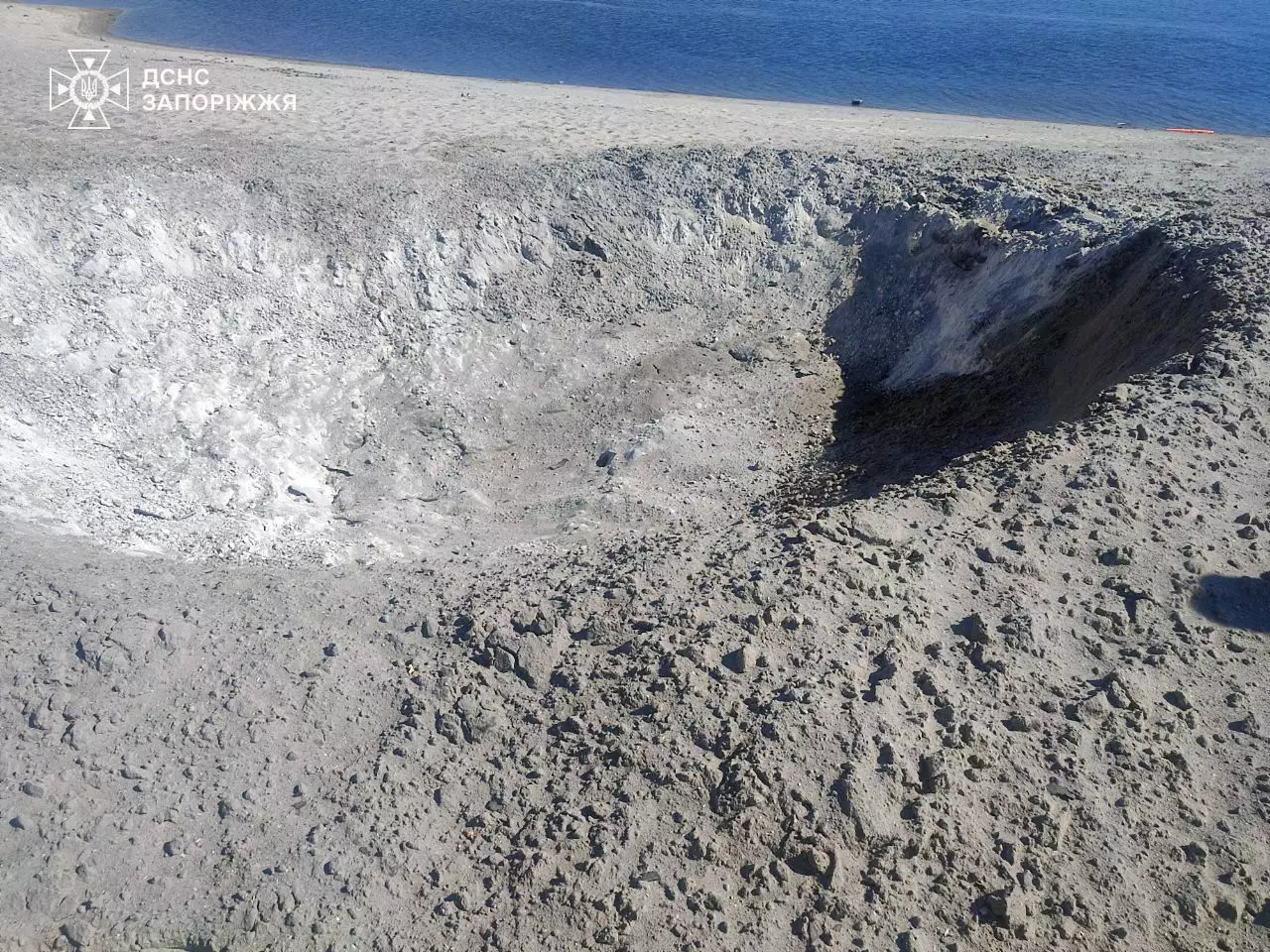
Guided bomb strike on a beach in Zaporizhzhia on June 24, 2026

On June 19, Russian troops launched a UAV strike on a building of the logistics operator "Nova Post" in the Oleksandrivskyi district. As a result of the attack, the building of the logistics hub was damaged, and a fire broke out, which rescuers quickly liquidated. In addition to the building, cars on the territory of the facility were destroyed or damaged. Nine people were injured.

June 20, in the evening, the enemy launched 9 strikes on the city using guided aerial bombs. Five people were killed, 11 were injured, and at least 19 apartment buildings were damaged.

June 24 saw Russian troops hitting the city's central beach with a guided aerial bomb; 6 people were injured, including 3 children.

=== September ===
Biological department of Zaporizhzhia National University after the attack

In the night on 21 September Russian drone attack largely destroyed Biological department of Zaporizhzhia National University (historical building of women's gymnasium, built in 1902). Two apartment buildings and a shopping center were also damaged. 8 people were injured in the city and its district.

=== October ===
On 6 October, a Russian attack hit a 500-square-meter warehouse in the city. According to Mykhailo Semikin, the attack killed one person. That same day, the Russians also hit multiple sites, including a bridge, injuring five people, a settlement in the suburbs, which injured two, and multiple energy facilities. Three days later, on 9 October, the Russians struck a high-rise building in the city, killing one and injuring 23 others, and a minibus was also hit with an FPV, injuring three. The following day, on 10 October 2026, a Russian glide bomb attack hit Zaporizhzhia, killing 20 people, including 3 children. A further 32 people were injured, of whom three were children. An apartment block was also mostly destroyed, according to acting mayor Regina Harchenk, while more than 80 workers were involved in rescue operations. Volodymyr Zelenskyy later commented on the attack, linking it to being a Russian "thank you" to the United States for agreeing to a diesel deal with Russian president Vladimir Putin to assist with rising energy costs.
