= Teodosie (name) =

Teodosie is a Romanian name meaning "Theodosius", and may refer to:

- Teodosie of Wallachia, Prince of Wallachia (1521-1522)
- Teodosie Bârcă (1894-?), politician from Bessarabia
- Teodosie Petrescu (b. 1955), Archbishop of Tomis since 2001
