= Zaporizhzhia National University =

Public university in Zaporizhzhia, Ukraine

Coordinates: 47.8200°N 35.1817°E

- Запорізький національний університет
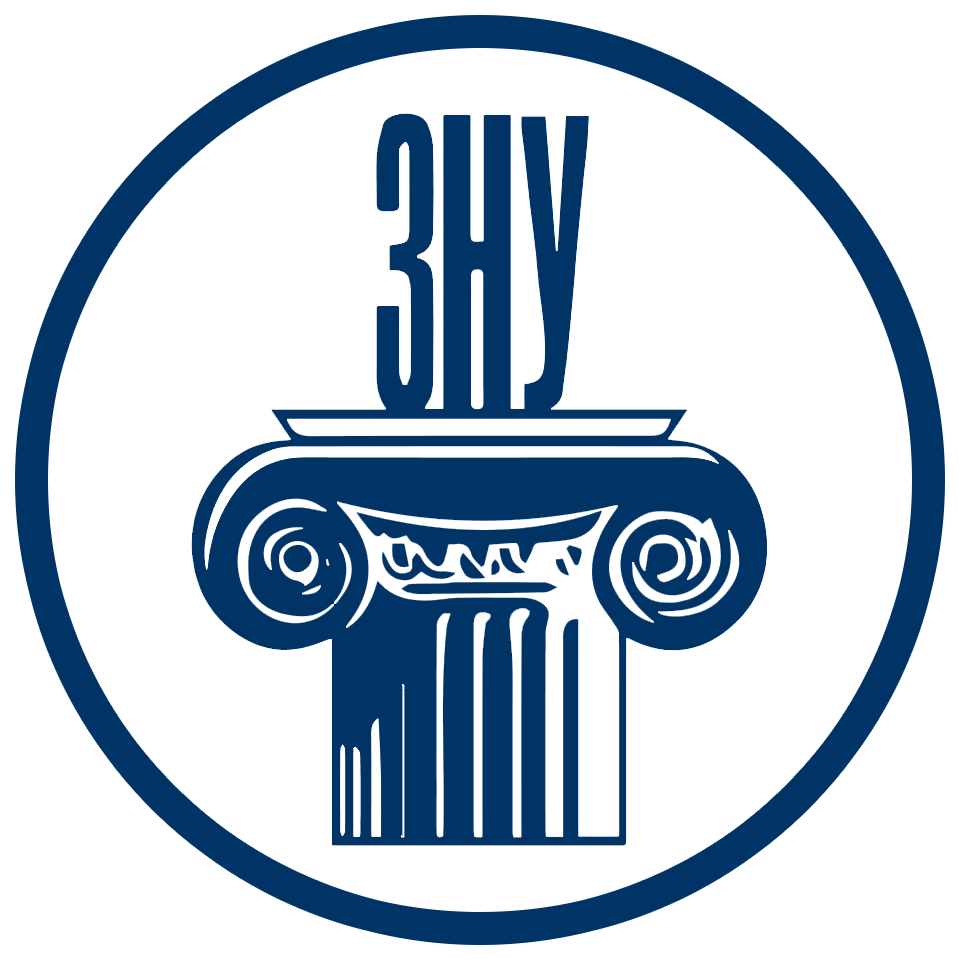
- University logo
- Established: August 11, 1930
- Affiliations: Ministry of Education and Science of Ukraine
- Rector: Mykola Frolov
- Students: 16,000
- Location: Zaporizhzhia, Ukraine
- Campus: Urban
- Website: Official website
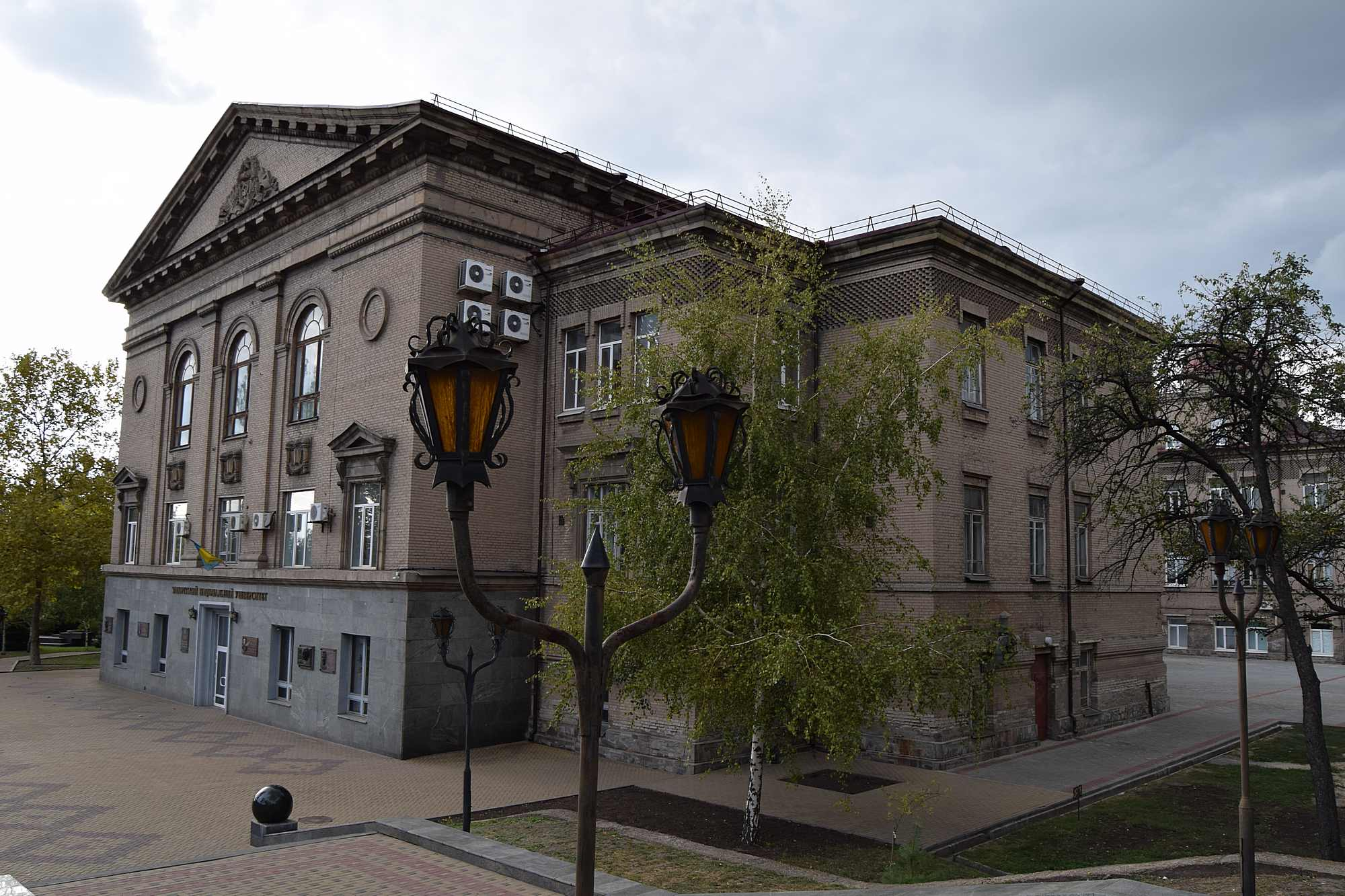

Immovable Monument of Local Significance of Ukraine
- Official name: Будинок чоловічої гімназії (Building of the men's gymnasium)
- Type: Architecture, Urban Planning
- Reference no.: 13-Зп

The Zaporizhzhia National University (ZNU) is a state-sponsored university in Zaporizhzhia, Ukraine. Its full official name is "Zaporizhzhia National University of the Ministry of Education and Science of Ukraine."

== History ==
On August 11, 1930, Sovnarkom Ukraine approved the list of 27 institutes and departments, including the Zaporizhzhia Institute of Education. In 1931, the Institute of Education was renamed the Pedagogical Institute of Vocational Education. It was once again renamed the Zaporozhye State Pedagogical Institute in 1933.

The first issue of teachers took place in 1932, according to the Council of Ministers of the USSR of 21.09.1982 № 872. At the opening of Zaporozhye of the State University the Council of Ministers of the Ukrainian USSR from 28.09.1982 Number 478 and the order of the USSR Ministry of 28.10.1982 № 1090 on the subject - "On the basis of Zaporozhye State Pedagogical Institute by the Ministry of Higher and Secondary Special Education of the Ukrainian SSR from 16.08.1985" Number 212 was created Zaporozhye State University.

Decision DAKU 30.03.2010, the Zaporizhzhia State University is accredited by the fourth level in general. Since 1995 it has an educational and scientific complex Zaporizhzhia University, which includes institutes, colleges, technical schools and about 50 schools in the city and region. Since 1996, the university has switched to a three-stage education system, offering bachelor's, specialist's, and master's degrees.

Zaporizhzhia State University has been a member of the European University Association (EATE) since 1999.

In 2003, ZNU became a member of the International Association of Sociology and Administration.

In 2004, ZNU became a member of the Ukrainian Association of Educational Management. On December 24, 2004, the President of Ukraine granted it the status of National University.

In 2008, Zaporizhzhia National University opened its Economics and Law Schools.

On February 1, 2009, it was subjected to Shopping college.

On March 30, 2009, the Economics and Humanities Schools were created in Melitopol.

On November 18, 2011, the Zaporizhzhia National University was admitted into the Eurasian Association of Universities.

In 2011, it opened 13 new majors.

On October 17, 2018, Zaporizhzhia State Engineering Academy was reorganized to become the Industrial Institute of Zaporizhzhia National University.

In June 2022, ZNU was twinned with Durham University in the United Kingdom as part of an initiative sponsored by Universities UK and the Ministry of Education and Science of Ukraine.

Building No. 3 (Biological department of the university) after the attack

The university was targeted by Russian attacks on September 20–21, 2026. The strikes damaged Buildings No. 3, 4, and 5, but did not result in casualties. Building No. 3 was built in 1902–1903 as Oleksandrivsk Girls' High School before being closed in 1920 and transferred to the university upon the latter's opening in 1930.

== Campus and building ==
1 Training Corps News:

- Department of Physics;
- Edition;
- Human Resources;
- Center for Information Technology;
- Reception of the Rector;
- Museum News;
- General Department;
- Department of International Relations and Work with Foreign Students;
- Reception vice-chancellors of research and educational work;
- Banquet hall;
- Laboratory theory and methods of teaching Physics .. O. Sergeyev.

2 Training Corps News:

- Research Library;
- Hall Research Library electronic resources;
- Center intensive foreign language;
- Resource Center for American studies;
- Admissions;
- Faculty of Journalism;
- Philology;
- Faculty of Foreign Languages;
- Economics and Law College;
- Assembly Hall;
- Chamber;
- Department of organizational work, control and treatment;
- Council of Young Scientists.

3 Training Corps News:

- Regional Research and Production Center "Ecology";
- Faculty of Biology.

4 Training Corps News:

- Department of Accounting, Financial and Budgetary Reporting;
- Department of Educational Work;
- Academic Council;
- Student Council;
- Union Committee;
- Faculty of Physical Education;
- Department of Philosophy;
- Cabinet Anatomy behalf of Dr. Levin;
- Student sector unions;
- Cabinet patent-licensing of Scientific Research;
- Postgraduate and Doctoral Studies;
- Administrative and Economic part;
- Employment Services;
- Department of Law;
- Division of Academic Affairs;
- Settlement Department;
- Planning and Finance Department;
- Department of Public Procurement;
- Center of cultural work;
- Civil Defense Headquarters;
- Department of Labor;
- Scientific and Technical Council;
- Scientific Association of Students;
- Technical Department;
- Service for Social Development.

5 Training Corps News:

- Faculty of Economics;
- Faculty of History and International Relations;
- Faculty of Mathematics.

6 Training Corps News:

- Faculty of Management;
- Faculty of Sociology and Management;
- Sanatorium;
- Student Infirmary;
- Department of Monitoring Educational Quality and Licensing;
- Center of Postgraduate;
- Center for Foreign Languages.

7 Training Corps (Sports Complex)

- Gym;
- Sports Floor;
- Sports Facilities.

8 Training Corps News:

- Faculty of Social Pedagogy and Psychology;
- Educational Theatre Department Acting. Biostation-dispensary on the island. Greyhound;
- WTO "Slavutich" (village Kirillovka, Zaporizhzhia.);
- Room for Students (lecture rooms, classrooms, laboratories, etc.) - 78338.4 m2;
- Facilities for Research and Pedagogical (teaching) Staff - 4605.3 m2;
- Office Space - 3790.5 m2;
- Library (including reading rooms) - 2203.6 m2;
- Dining, Buffets - 3344.4 m2;
- Preventive, Recreation - 5379.6 m2;
- Medical Centers - 140,7 m2.

== Institutes and faculties ==
Departments:

- Mathematics;
- Physics;
- Economic;
- History and International Relations;
- Biology;
- Philology;
- Legal;
- Faculty of Foreign Languages;
- Faculty of Physical Education;
- Faculty of Social pedagogy and Psychology;
- Faculty of Management;
- Faculty of Sociology and Management;
- Faculty of Journalism;
- Separated units Students;
- Crimean Faculty;
- Rig Faculty;
- Nikopoly Faculty;
- Economy and Humanities Faculty News in;
- Melitopoly;
- Economy and Law College;
- Trading College.

== Rectors ==
- Melnyk F. P. (1930–1932)
- Mitrofanov I. H. (1932–1933)
- Volkov H. O. (1934–1937)
- V. A. Poselyanin (1937–1941)
- Tarasenko V. Y. (1943–1945)
- Lober D. E. (1945–1952)
- Shakalo M. B. (1952–1968)
- Chernenko A. M. (1968–1974)
- Horpynych V. O. (1975–1978)
- Ivashchenko Y. V. (1979–1984)
- Tolok V. O. (1984–2003)
- Savin V. V. (2003–2005)
- Turchenko F. G. (2005) Acting Rector
- Timchenko S. M. (2005–2011)
- Bondar O. H. (2011–2012) Acting Rector
- Frolov M. O. (since 2012)

== Honorable doctors and famous alumni ==
- Poet Peter Ridge
- Producer Vladislav Riashyn
- Finalist television project "Dancing with the stars" Vladislav Yama
- Journalist radio "Freedom"
- Mathematician Roman Vershynin
- The writer Paul Volvach
- Champion games HHIV Olympics in Seoul Tatyana Samoilenko-Dorovskykh
- Four world boxing champion Wladimir Sidorenko
- World Champion boxing, WBA Valeriy Sidorenko
- A bronze medalist in Sydney with diving Elena Zhupina
- Silver medalist in Sydney in swimming Denis Sylantyev
- World Heavyweight Champion Professional Boxer Wladimir Klitschko
- Three-time croquet World Champion Kennedy Gundy
- And many others

== See also ==
List of universities in Ukraine
