= Fedot =

Fedot (Russian: Федот, old orthography: Ѳедотъ) is a masculine Russian form of given name Theodotus (Greek: Θεόδοτος).

Of note is a Russian rhymed proverb: Федот да не тот, Fedot da ne tot, 'Fedot, but a wrong one', said about someone who is other than expected or worse than he pretends to be. The name gives the rise to the patronymic surnames Fedotov, Fedotenko, Fedotenkov.

Notable people with the name include:

- Fedot Alekseyevich Popov (died between 1648 and 1654), Russian explorer
- Fedot Shubin (1740–1805), Russian sculptor
- Fedot Sychkov (1870–1958), Russian painter
- Fedot Tumusov (born 1955), Russian politician

Fictional characters include:

- The protagonist of the 1985 humorous fairy-tale play-poem The Tale of Fedot the Strelets and its adaptations
- Fedot Vaskov from the Russian war drama films The Dawns Here Are Quiet (1972), The Dawns Here Are Quiet (2015), and the novel of which they are based, The Dawns Here Are Quiet.

== See also ==
- Feodosiy
- Theodosius
- Fédote Bourgasoff (1890–1945), Russian-born French cinematographer
