= Lysias (disambiguation) =

Lysias (c. 440 BC – c. 380 BC) was an Ancient Greek orator. Lysias may also refer to:

- Lysias (Syrian chancellor) (died 162 BC), chancellor of the Seleucid Empire, enemy of the Maccabees
- Claudius Lysias, figure mentioned in the New Testament book of the Acts of the Apostles
- Lysias Anicetus (reigned c. 130–120 BC), Indo-Greek king
- Lysias of Tarsus, Priest of Hercules and tyrant of Tarsus in the 1st century BC
- Lysias, one of the Athenian generals at the Battle of Arginusae (406 BC), during the Peloponnesian War
- Lysias, Phrygia, a city and episcopal see in the Roman province of Phrygia Salutaris I

== See also ==
- Lysis (disambiguation)
