= Fedoseyev =

Fedoseyev or Fedoseev (Russian: Федосеев) is a Russian masculine surname, its feminine counterpart is Fedoseyeva or Fedoseeva. It may refer to

- Dmitry Fedoseev (born 1965), Russian football player
- Lidiya Fedoseyeva-Shukshina (born 1938), Russian actress, wife of Vasily Shukshin
- Nikolai Fedoseev (1871–1898), pioneer of Marxism in Russia
- Oleg Fedoseyev (1936–2001), Russian long jumper
- Pyotr Fedoseyev (1908–1990), Soviet philosopher and politician
- Vladimir Fedoseyev (born 1932), Russian classical conductor
- Vladimir Fedoseev (born 1995), Russian chess grandmaster

== See also ==
- 7741 Fedoseev, a minor planet
