= Gleb Fedotov =

Russian footballer

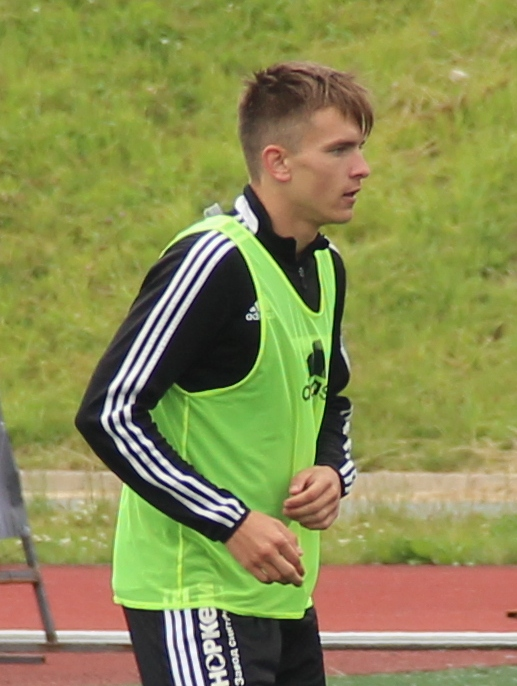

Personal information
- Full name: Gleb Sergeyevich Fedotov
- Date of birth: 20 September 1995 (age 31)
- Height: 1.76 m (5 ft 9 1/2 in)
- Position: Midfielder

Youth career
- FC Khimik-Tosol-Sintez Dzerzhinsk

Senior career*
Years	Team	Apps	(Gls)
2014–2016	FC Khimik Dzerzhinsk	12	(0)
- * Club domestic league appearances and goals

Gleb Sergeyevich Fedotov (Russian: Глеб Сергеевич Федотов; born 20 September 1995) is a former Russian football player.

== Club career ==
He made his professional debut in the Russian Football National League for FC Khimik Dzerzhinsk on 23 March 2014 in a game against FC Sibir Novosibirsk.
