= Fedosov =

Fedosov (Russian: Федосов) is a Russian masculine surname, its feminine counterpart is Fedosova. It may refer to

- Albert Fedosov (born 1970), Russian football player
- Genrikh Fedosov (1932–2005), Russian football player
- Pavlo Fedosov (born 1996), Ukrainian football player
- Tamara Safonova (née Fedosova in 1946), Russian diver

== See also ==
- Fedosov manifold
