= Lysis (disambiguation) =

Lysis is the breaking down of the membrane of a cell. Lysis may also refer to:

- Lysis (dialogue), a dialogue of Plato about friendship (philia)
- Lysis of Taras (fl. c. 5th century BCE), Greek philosopher
- Lysis, one of the stages of the lytic cycle, one of the two cycles of viral reproduction
- Alkaline lysis, a method used in molecular biology to isolate plasmid DNA from bacteria

== See also ==
- Lysias (disambiguation)
