= Theodotus =

Theodotus (Greek: Θεόδοτος "given by God" or "given by gods") is the name of:

- Theodotus of Aetolia (3rd century BC), an Aetolian general who held the command of Coele-Syria for Ptolemy Philopator (221–204 BC), king of Egypt
- Theodotus Hemiolius (3rd century BC), a general in the service of king Antiochus III the Great (223–187 BC)
- Theodotus of Chios (1st century BC), rhetoric tutor of the young Egyptian king Ptolemy XIII
- Theodotus of Byzantium (2nd century), an early Christian writer from Byzantium
- Theodotus the Gnostic (2nd century), a key formulator of Eastern Gnosticism who taught in Asia Minor
- Theodotus of Ancyra (martyr) (4th century), fourth-century Christian martyr
- Theodotus of Laodicea, bishop (c.310–c.335)
- Theodotus (praefectus urbi), praefectus urbi of Constantinople
- Theodotus of Antioch (died 429), patriarch of Antioch in 420–429
- Theodotus of Ancyra (bishop) (5th century), a fifth-century bishop of Ancyra
- Theodotus I of Constantinople, Ecumenical Patriarch in 815–821
- Theodotus II of Constantinople (1070s–1153), Ecumenical Patriarch in 1151–1153
- Theodotos Kalothetos, a senior official and governor in the Empire of Nicaea
- Theodotus of Caesarea, third-century Christian martyr

== See also ==
- Theodote (disambiguation)
- Theodotos inscription
- Fedot, Russian form
- Aurelius Theodotus, a Roman general of emperor Gallienus
- William Theodotus Capers (1867–1943), a bishop of the Diocese of West Texas in the Episcopal Church
- Allahverdi (given name), same semantics
