= Dositej =

Dositej is a South Slavic masculine given name, a form of Dositheus. Notable people with the name include:

- Dositej II of Ohrid and Macedonia
- Dositej Novaković
- Dositej Obradović, Serbian monk, author, and educator
- Dositej Vasić, metropolitan of Serbian Orthodox Church
