= Vasily Fedotov =

Soviet General

Vasily Nikolayevich Fedotov
- Native name: Василий Николаевич Федотов
- Born: 22 December 1915; Kamen, Barnaulsky Uyezd, Tomsk Governorate, Russian Empire
- Died: 9 January 1997 (aged 81) Moscow, Russia
- Allegiance: Soviet Union
- Branch: Red Army
- Service years: 1935–1973
- Rank: Major-General
- Conflicts: World War II; Winter War; Eastern Front
- Awards: Hero of the Soviet Union

Vasily Nikolayevich Fedotov (Russian: Василий Николаевич Федотов; 22 December 1915 – 9 January 1997) was a major general of the Soviet Army, who was awarded the title Hero of the Soviet Union for his actions in battle in the Second World War while he was a Lieutenant Colonel.

== Biography ==
Vasily Fedotov was born on 22 December 1915 in Kamen, Tomsk Governorate to a working-class Russian family. After finishing seven grades of school he worked as a driver. In 1935, Fedotov was drafted into the Red Army. In 1938, he graduated from the Omsk Infantry School, after which he fought in the Winter War and was wounded. Immediately after the German invasion of the Soviet Union, in July 1941, he was sent into combat in the Second World War. In 1942, Fedotov graduated from a course for regimental commanders.

By September 1943, Fedotov, then a Lieutenant Colonel, commanded the 569th Rifle Regiment of the 161st Rifle Division in the 40th Army on the Voronezh Front. During the Battle of the Dnieper on 23 September 1943, Fedotov's regiment moved across the Dnieper in the area of the village of Zarubintsy, Kaniv Raion (currently Cherkasy Raion) of Cherkasy Oblast of the Ukrainian SSR, he seized a bridgehead on the west bank and repelled four German counterattacks. During the attack from the bridgehead the next day, Fedotov's regiment moved forward and expelled German forces from the village of Trakhtemyriv. He was wounded twice, but remained on active duty.

By the Decree of the Presidium of the Supreme Soviet of the USSR on 23 October 1943 he was awarded the title Hero of the Soviet Union for "courage, and heroism shown in the fight against the German invaders".

Later in the war, he was seriously wounded and did not return to the front. After the end of the war he served in various military schools. In 1952, he graduated from the Frunze Military Academy, and from 1953 to 1960 he commanded the Lviv Military School; 1960 to 1965 the Baku Higher Military Command School; and from 1965 to 1973 the Moscow Suvorov Military School.

In 1973 he retired with the rank of major general and lived in Moscow until he died on 9 January 1997; his ashes were placed in the columbarium of the Donskoye Cemetery in Moscow.

Fedotov was an honorary citizen of Ivano-Frankivsk.
