= Theodota (concubine) =

Theodota (or Theodote; Italian Teodote or Teodota) was a Byzantine noblewoman, most notable for her association with the Lombard king Cunipert (688–700). The Plutei of Theodota are named after her.

A biography of her appears in Book 5 of Paul the Deacon's Historia Langobardorum. This calls her "a girl from a most noble Roman [ie Byzantine, probably Ravennese] family". She was noticed by Cunipert's wife Ermelinda in the baths which had been built by Damian of Pavia - the Lombard kings at the end of the 7th century still followed a Byzantine style of living, including bathing. Ermelinda described Theodota's beauty, especially her elegant and ornate long blonde hair. Cunipert did not indicate any explicit interest in the girl but instead immediately organised a hunt outside Pavia and ordered Ermelinda to take part in it with him. However, when night fell Cunipert secretly returned to the city and slept with Theodota - Paul initially states that Cunipert "cum ea concubit" (went to bed with her), leaving it unclear whether it was consensual or not, but later on in Book 5 (Chapter 37) writes "de stupro Theodotae" (about the rape of Theodota). Damian concludes by writing that Cunipert later placed Theodota in a nunnery in Pavia "that was named after her", meaning Santa Maria alla Pusterla, later renamed Santa Maria Teodote.
