= Dositheus Ivanchenko =

Russian Orthodox bishop of Brooklyn

Archbishop Dositheus
- Михаил Матвеевич Иванченко
- Born: Mikhail Matveyevich Ivanchenko; November 9 (21), 1884; Kharkov Governorate, Russian Empire
- Died: June 1, 1984 (aged 99); Pine Bush, New York, USA
- Education: Kharkov University
- Occupations: Bishop of the Russian Orthodox Church, bishop of Brooklyn

Archbishop Dositheus (secular name Mikhail Matveyevich Ivanchenko, Russian: Михаил Матвеевич Иванченко; 9 (21) November 1884 - 1 June 1984) was a bishop of the Russian Orthodox Church, bishop of Brooklyn.

== Biography ==
In 1910 he entered the mathematical faculty of Kharkov University. On 1 (14) April 1914, at the St. Elijah church in Syzran, held his wedding with female gymnasium teacher Klavdia Georgievna Kopylova.

Same year he graduated from the university on the first category and was assigned to a teaching post in the Ufa Men's Gymnasium, where he also ran a church choir. In 1916 he defended his thesis for the title of Master of Mathematics.

On November 8, 1917 bishop Andrew (Ukhtomsky) of Ufa ordained him deacon, and on November 14 of the same year ordained him priest. After that, until 1919, he served as the second priest of the St. Elijah church.

From 1919 to 1923 he was in the prisons of Siberia.

In 1927 he moved to Kharkov, where he was engaged in scientific work at the mathematical department of the university, and then in the rank of professor for 12 years headed the chair of mathematics at the Kharkov Electrotechnical Institute. During this time he wrote a number of works on the specialty.

In 1941, during the German occupation, he returned to pastoral work. From September 20, 1941 to January 21, 1942 he served in the Intercession Monastery. January 3, 1942 Metropolitan Theophilus (Buldovsky) of Kharkov UAOC, appointed him rector of the parish in the village Kotelva. In January 1942 Metropolitan Theophilus (Buldovsky) awarded him a pectoral cross. In the same year he received from the Theophilus (Buldovsky) the rank of archpriest and palitsa.

Having lost his wife and two sons who died at the front, May 15, 1943 in Kiev, took monastic vows with the name Dositheus and was elevated to the rank of archimandrite from UAOC Archbishop Nicanor (Abramovich) of Kiev.

Until August 1943 he served dean of the church district and chairman of the diocesan administration of the Poltava diocese. Further service of Archimandrite Dositheus, in connection with the offensive of the Red Army, took place in the parishes of Lviv and of Krynitsa.

November 17, 1944 participated in the meeting of the bishops of the UAOC in the city of Breslau (now Wrocław, Poland) as a representative of the Poltava diocese.

Then, as a result of military operations, he was sent to Germany. In 1945 the city of Heidelberg he founded an Orthodox parish in the camp for displaced persons. He moved to the Russian Orthodox Church Outside of Russia, but without recognition of the rank of archimandrite, received in the UAOC. His daughter Hilaria, born in 1933, lived with him. He spoke two foreign languages: German and English.

Because of the conflict, on March 26, 1948, the metropolitan Seraphim (Lade) of Berlin and Germany relieved him from post of rector of the Heidelberg parish. Despite this, Dositheus continued to perform divine services in Heidelberg in a private apartment (such service was practiced in the USSR).

October 23, 1949 in the St. Nicholas Church in Munich, Bishop Alexander (Lovchу) of Kissingen, vicar of the ROCOR German diocese, re-elevated him to the rank of archimandrite.

On April 25, 1950, Metropolitan Seraphim (Lade) of Berlin and Germany was appointed rector of the St. Nicholas Church in Stuttgart, but on May 15 of the same year Dositheus (Ivanchenko) received a canonical release from Metropolitan Seraphim to move to another diocese, after which he left for the USA together with his sick daughter.

In November 1951, the exarch of the Moscow Patriarch in the North and South America, Archbishop Macarius (Ilinsky), was admitted to the jurisdiction of the Moscow Patriarchate and was first appoint him clergyman of the cathedral in New York, and then moved rector of St. Nicholas Cathedral in San Francisco instead of the estranged priest Pyotr Kotlyarov. However, the Soviet embassy in the USA found it wrong to use the "traitor" at work in the Exarchate, and also pointed to the possibility of Ivanchenko's departure together with the cathedral entrusted to him and coming into schism. However, the ministers of the Patriarchal Exarchate in North and South America: Archbichop Macarius (Ilinsky), Archbichop Adam (Filipovsky), fr. Joseph Dzvonchik and fr. Alexander Prisadsky could protect Archimandrite Dositheus from accusations.

Later he served in the parishes in Lopez, Pennsylvania; Baltimore; Philadelphia. He adopted citizenship of the United States.

On December 25, 1958 he was appointed rector of St. Nicholas Cathedral in New York.

On April 25, 1959, the Holy Synod of the Russian Orthodox Church elected archimandrite Dositheus (Ivanchenko) as Bishop of New York, so that his naming and consecration were performed on the Easter week of 1959 in New York.

May 8, 1959 in St. Nicholas Cathedral in New York Archbishop Panteleimon (Rudyk) of Edmonton and Canada, bishop Orestes (Chornok) of Agafonikea and bishop of the Romanian Orthodox Church in America Andrei (Moldovan) took his bishop nomination. On May 9 of the same year, at the St. Nicholas Cathedral in New York, he was ordained bishop by same hierarchs.

February 22, 1963 he appointed Bishop of Brooklyn, vicar of the New York diocese. In the same year he was awarded the Order of St. Vladimir the Equal-to-the-Apostles II rank.

April 5, 1970 was elevated to the rank of archbishop with the right to wear a cross on a hood.

On April 10, 1970, the Orthodox Church in America was granted autocephaly from Russian Orthodox Church, the dioceses of the latter in the USA and Canada were abolished. On the same day, Archbishop Dositheus was retired, according to the petition.

He reposed on June 1, 1984, in Pine Bush, New York. The funeral was performed on June 5 in the patriarchal parish in the name of All Saints of Russia in Pine Bush, New York. Buried in a church cemetery in Pine Bush, which was founded in 1962 by his care.
