= Theodosius =

Theodosius (Latinized from the Greek "Θεοδόσιος", Theodosios, "given by god") is a given name. It may take the form Teodósio, Teodosie, Teodosije etc. Theodosia is a feminine version of the name.

== Emperors of ancient Rome and Byzantium ==
- Theodosius I (347–395; "Theodosius the Great"), son of Theodosius the Elder
- Theodosius II (408–450)
- Theodosius III (715–717)
- Theodosius (son of Maurice) (583/585–602), eldest son and co-emperor of the Byzantine emperor Maurice

== Popes of the Coptic Orthodox Church ==
- Pope Theodosius I of Alexandria (d. 566)
- Pope Theodosius II of Alexandria (d. 742)
- Pope Theodosius III of Alexandria (d. 1300)

== Patriarchs of Alexandria ==
- Patriarch Theodosius I of Alexandria (535–567)
- Patriarch Theodosius II of Alexandria (12th century)

== Other clergy and monastics ==
In chronological order:

- Theodosius, bishop of Philadelphia in Lydia, deposed at the Council of Seleucia, 359
- Theodosius the Cenobiarch (c. 423–529), a monk, abbot, and saint, founder and of the cenobitic way of monastic life
- Theodosius, archdeacon and pilgrim to the Holy Land, author of De Situ Terrae Sanctae ca. 518-530
- Theodosius the Deacon, 10th-century Byzantine poet who wrote the poem "The Conquest of Crete"
- Theodosius of Kiev, 11th-century Kyivan Rus saint
- Theodosius, Metropolitan of Moscow (1461–1464)
- Theodosius Florentini (1808–1865), Swiss Capuchin friar, a founder of Catholic religious orders
- Teodósio de Gouveia (1889–1962), Portuguese cardinal, served as archbishop in Mozambique (1940-1962)
- Theodosius (Lazor) (1933–2020), Metropolitan/primate of the Orthodox Church in America (1977-2002)
- Theodosios (Hanna) (born 1965), Greek Orthodox Archbishop of Sebastia (2005-)

== Dukes of Braganza ==
- Teodósio I, Duke of Braganza (1510–1563), 5th Duke of Braganza
- Teodósio II, Duke of Braganza (1558–1630), 7th Duke of Braganza
- Teodósio, Prince of Brazil (1634–1653), 9th Duke of Braganza and 1st Prince of Brazil

== Others ==
In chronological order:

- Theodosius of Bithynia or Theodosius of Tripolis (c. 160 BC – c. 100 BC), Greek astronomer and mathematician
- Theodosius, godson of Belisarius (c. 505–565) and Antonina
- Theodosius (play), 1680 tragedy by Nathaniel Lee

== First name ==
- Theodosius Keene, an 18th-century English architect
- Theodosio De Stefani Perez (1853-1935), Italian naturalist and entomologist
- Theodosius Dobzhansky (1900–1975), noted geneticist and evolutionary biologist

== See also ==
- Ataullah or Atallah, Arabic name with similar meaning, used by Muslims and sometimes also by Christians
- Teodosie (name)
- Teodosije (disambiguation)
- Dositheus, a name wit the reversed order of stems
