= History of Zaporizhzhia =

The history of Zaporizhzhia shows the origins of Zaporizhzhia, a city located in modern-day Ukraine.

== Pre-foundation history ==
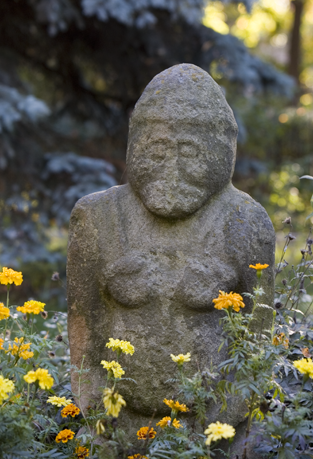
A Kurgan stele (Note: This image of a kurgan stele has been taken in Kharkiv, but one may find similar statues at Khortytsia Island.)

Archaeological finds show that about two or three thousand years ago Scythians lived around the modern city. Later, Khazars, Pechenegs, Kuman, Tatars and Slavs dwelt there. The trade route from the Varangians to the Greeks passed through the island of Khortytsia. These territories were called the "Wild Fields", because they were not under the control of any state (it was the land between the highly eroded borders of the Polish–Lithuanian Commonwealth, the Grand Duchy of Moscow, and the Ottoman Empire).

In the 1550s, Dmytro Vyshnevetsky erected Khortytsia Castle, consisting of wood-earth fortifications on the small island Little Khortytsia which is near the western shore of Khortytsia island. Some historians and archeologists consider these fortifications to be a prototype for the Zaporizhzhian Sich — the stronghold of the paramilitary peasant regiments of Cossacks.

== Russian Empire (1654–1917) ==
=== Foundation of Zaporizhzhia ===
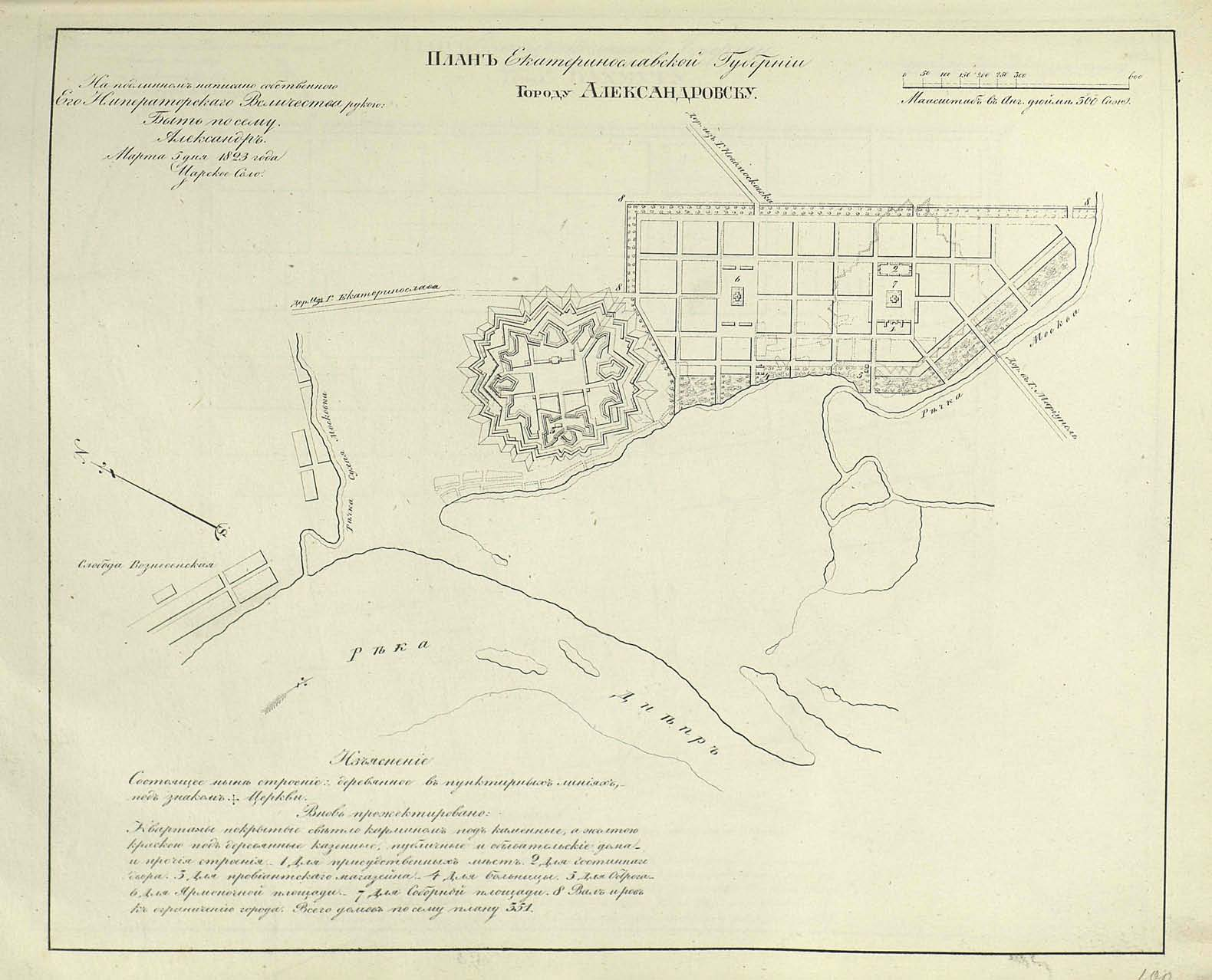
A plan of Alexandrovsk, 1823

In 1770 the fortress of Aleksandrovskaya (Александровская) was erected and is considered to be the year of the foundation of Zaporizhzhia. As a part of the Dnieper Defence Line the fortress protected the southern territories of Russian Empire from Crimean Tatar invasions. It is uncertain in whose honour the fortress was named. Some believe that it was Alexander Mikhailovich Golitsyn, the general who served Catherine the Great. Other possibilities are Prince Alexander Vyazemsky or Alexander Rumyantsev.

In 1775, Russia and the Ottoman Empire signed the Küçük Kaynarca peace treaty, according to which the southern lands of the Russian Plain and Crimean peninsula became Russian-governed territories. As a result, the Aleksandrovskaya Fortress lost its military significance and converted into a small provincial rural town, known from 1806 under the name Alexandrovsk (Александровск).

=== Mennonite settlers ===
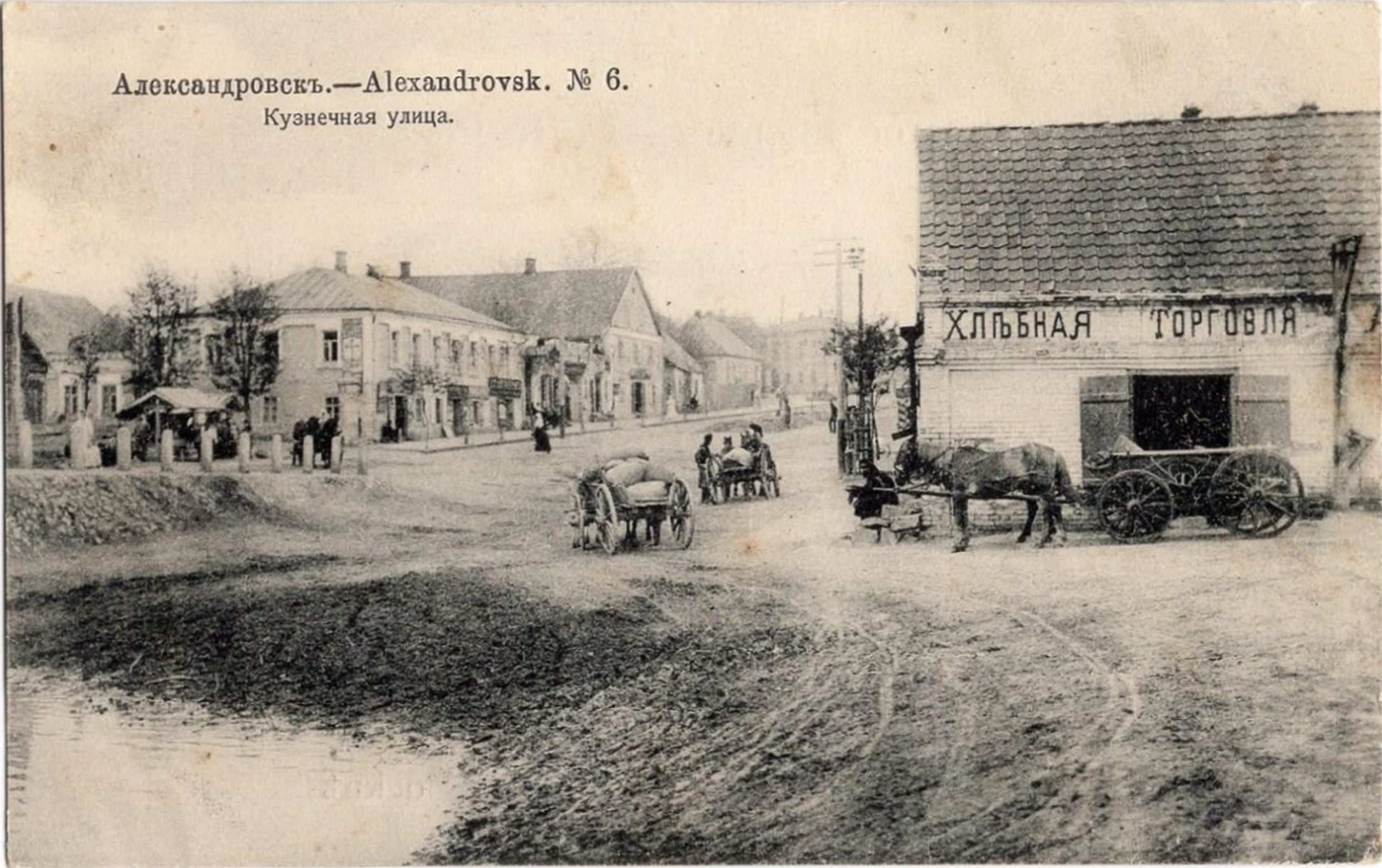
A view of Alexandrovsk at the end of the 19th century.

In 1789, Mennonites from the Baltic city of Danzig (Gdańsk) accepted the invitation from Catherine the Great to settle several colonies in the area of the modern city. The island of Khortytsia was gifted to them for "perpetual possession" by the Russian government. In 1914, the Mennonites sold the island back to the city. The Mennonites built mills and agricultural factories in Alexandrovsk.

During the Russian Revolution and especially by World War II most of the Mennonites had fled to North and South America as well as being forcefully relocated to eastern Russia. At present, few Mennonites live in Zaporizhzhia, although in the area many industrial buildings and houses built by Mennonites are preserved.

=== The ferry ===
In 1829, it was proposed to build a cable ferry across the Dnieper. The ferry could carry a dozen carts. The project was approved by Tsar and later was used in other parts of the Russian Empire. In 1904 the ferry was replaced by the Kichkas Bridge (see next section), which was built in the narrowest part of the river called "Wolf Throat", near to the northern part of the Khortytsia Island.

=== Establishment of railway and Kichkas Bridge ===
The first railway bridge over the Dnieper was the Kichkas (Кичкасский) Bridge, which was designed by Y.D. Proskuryakov and E. O. Paton. The construction works were supervised by F. W. Lat. The total bridge length was 336 m (1,102 ft). It crossed the river with a single span of 190 m (620 ft). The upper tier carried a double-track railway line, whilst the lower tier was used for other types of vehicles; both sides of the bridge were assigned as footpaths. It was built at the narrowest part of the Dnieper river known as Wolf Throat. Construction started in 1900, and it opened for pedestrian traffic in 1902. The official opening of the bridge was 17 April 1904, though railway traffic on the bridge only commenced on 22 January 1908. The opening of the Kichkas Bridge led to the industrial growth of Alexandrovsk.

In 1916, during World War I, the aviation engines plant of DEKA Stock Association (today better known as the Motor Sich) was transferred from Saint Petersburg.

=== Ukrainian War of Independence (1917–1921) ===
The Kichkas Bridge was of strategic importance during the Ukrainian War of Independence and Russian Civil War, and carried troops, ammunition, the wounded and medical supplies. Because of this bridge, Alexandrovsk and its environs was the scene of fierce fighting from 1918 to 1921 between the Red Army and the White armies of Denikin and Wrangel, Petliura's Ukrainian People's Army of the Ukrainian People's Republic and German-Austrian troops, and after their defeat, the struggle with insurgents led by Hryhoriv and Makhno. The bridge was damaged a number of times. The most serious damage was inflicted by Makhno's troops when they retreated from Alexandrovsk in 1920 and blew a 40-metre-wide (130 ft) gap in the middle of the bridge.

Afterwards, it became the capital of the newly formed Zaporizhzhia Governorate of Ukraine.

People's Commissar of Railways Felix Dzerzhinsky of the Bolshevik government ordered the repair of the bridge. The metallurgical plant of the Bryansk joint-stock company (present day Dniprovsky Metallurgical Plant) in Katerynoslav (today Dnipro) built a replacement section. The Kichkas Bridge reopened on 14 September 1921. On 19 October 1921, the Soviet Council of Labor and Defense (chaired by Lenin) awarded the Yekaterininsky railroad the Order of the Red Banner of the Ukrainian Soviet Socialist Republic for the early restoration of the Kichkas Bridge.

== In the time of Soviet Ukraine as a part of the USSR (1922–1991) ==
=== Industrialization in the 1920 – 1930s ===
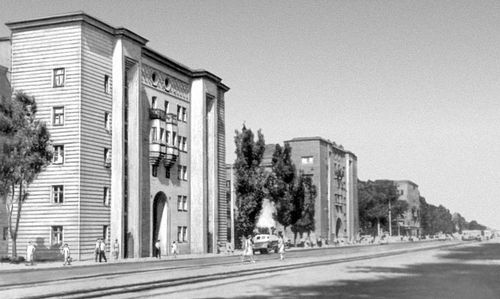
Residential district "SotsGorod". Buildings at Sobornyi Avenue (architect Lavrov, built in 1936)

At the beginning of 20th century, Zaporizhzhia was a small unremarkable rural town of the Russian Empire, which acquired industrial importance during the industrialization carried out by the Soviet government in the 1920s and 1930s. In 1929–1932, a master plan for city construction was developed. At 10 km (6.2 miles) from the old town Alexandrovsk at the narrowest part of the Dnieper river was planned to build the hydroelectric power station, the most powerful in Europe at that time. Close to the station should be constructed the new modern city and a giant steel and aluminum plants. Later the station was named "DnieproHES", the steel plant – "Zaporizhstal'" (Zaporizhzhia Steel Plant), and the new part of the city – "Sotsmisto" (or "Sotsgorod" in Russian, meaning "Socialist city"). Production of the aluminum plant ("DAZ" – Dnieper Aluminium Plant) according to the plan should exceed the overall production of the aluminum all over Europe at that time.

State Institute for Design of Metallurgical Plants (GIPROMEZ) developed a project of creation of the Dnieper Industrial Complex. GIPROMEZ consulted with various companies, including the Freyn Engineering Company of Chicago (USA), which participated in the design and construction of the blast furnaces.

In the 1930s the American United Engineering and Foundry Company built a strip mill, which produced hot and cold rolling steel strip. This was a copy of the Ford River Rouge steel mill. Annual capacity of the mill reached 540,000 tonnes (600,000 short tons). Strip width was 170 cm (66 inches). There was a second section that used a Soviet copy of the Demag AG strip mill that produced 110 cm (45 inches) wide strip steel.

=== The hydro-electric dam, DniproHES ===
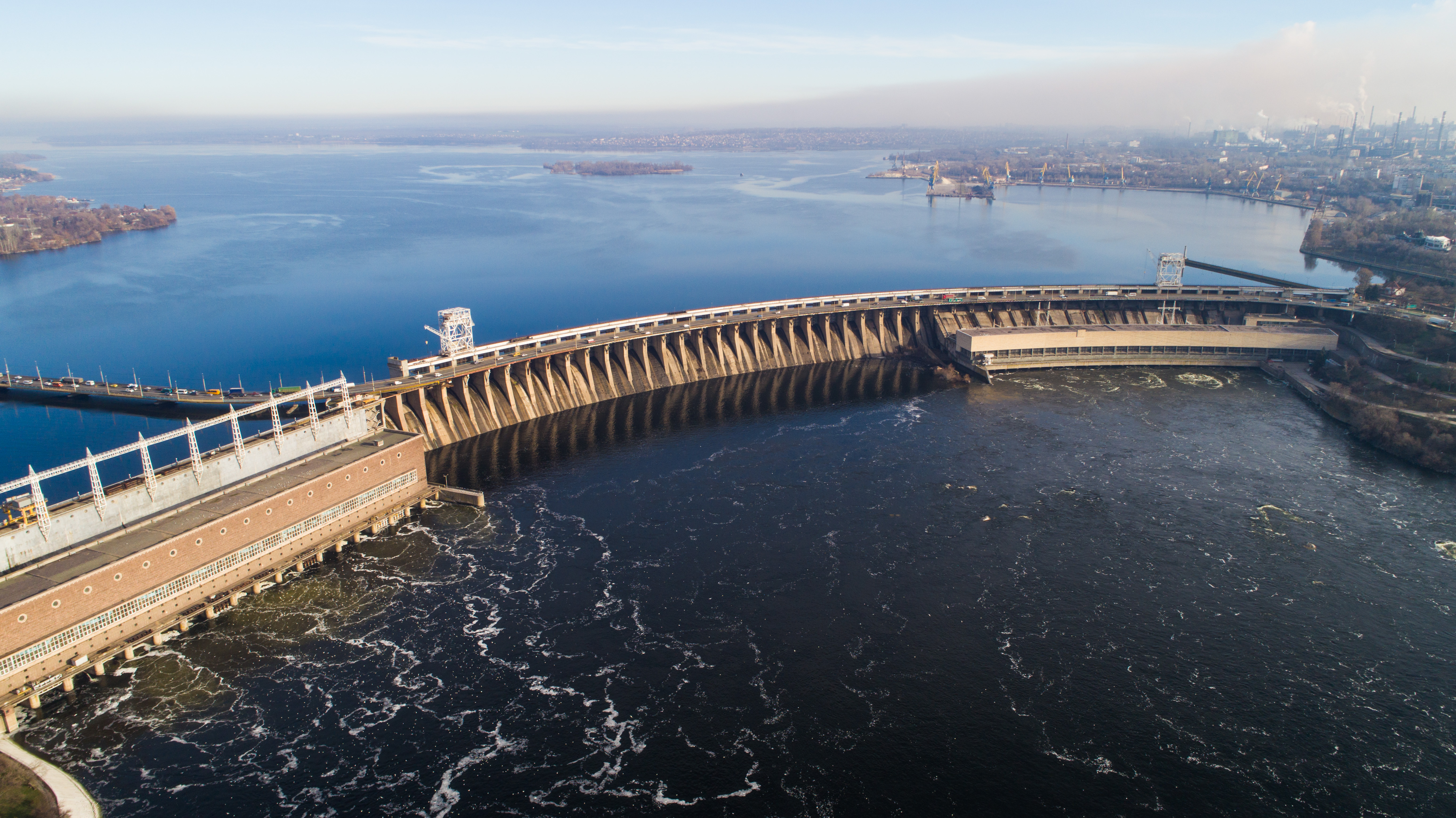
Dnieper hydroelectric power plant

The turning point in the history of the city was the construction of the hydro-electric dam (DniproHES), which began in 1927 and completed in 1932. The principal designer of the project was I. G. Alexandrov, the construction manager – A. V. Vinter, the chief architect – V. A. Vesnin and the chief American advisor – the colonel Hugh Cooper. The installed generating capacity was 560 megawatts, the length of a convex dam was 760 m (2,490 feet), the width was 56 m (184 feet), the height was 60 m (200 feet).

Eight turbines and five electrical generators were designed and manufactured in the United States. The other three generators were made at the Leningrad factory Electrosila. After commissioning the Dnieper rapids were flooded, and the river became navigable from Kyiv to Kherson. In 1980 a new generator building was built, and the station power was increased to 1,388 megawatts

=== The city of Socialism (Sotsgorod) ===
Between the hydroelectric dam and industrial area in 10 km (6.2 miles) from the centre of the old Alexandrovsk was established residential district No. 6, which was named Sotsgorod (or Sotsmisto in Ukrainian). In 20th doctrinaire idealistic enthusiasm of the architects was reflected in the intense debate about the habitation of the socialist community. The architects believed that by using new architectural forms they could create a new society. District No. 6 was one of the few implementations of urban development concepts. The construction of the district began in 1929 and finished in 1932.

The main idea guiding the architects was the creation of a garden city, a city of the future. Multi-storey houses (not more than 4 floors) with large, roomy apartments were built in Sotsgorod with spacious yards planted with grass and trees around the buildings. Nikolai Kolli, V. A. Vesnin, G. M. Orlov, V. G. Lavrov and others designed the DniproHES and SotsGorod. Le Corbusier visited the town few times in the 1930s. The architects used the ideas of the constructivist architecture.

The ring house the building No. 31 at Independent Ukraine Street (formerly – 40 years of Soviet Ukraine Street) was designed by V. G. Lavrov. Families of the Soviet and American engineers, advisors, and industry bosses lived in Sotsgorod at that time. However, most of the workers during the construction of the hydro-power station and plants lived in dugouts at No. 15 and Aluminum districts. The south border of the Sotsgorog is limited by Verkhnya Ulitsa (Upper Street) and north border – by the hydroelectric power station. At the intersection between Sobornyi Avenue and Verkhnia Street, architect I.L. Kosliner set a tower with seven stories. This tower supposedly indicates the entrance gate of Sotsgorod from the south (from Alexandrovsk). Closer to the dam, the second tower was raised (architects I.L. Kosliner and L.Ya. Gershovich). Both towers point out a straight line of the central street of the district.

The names of the streets have changed several times. The original name of Metallurgist Avenue was Enthusiasts Alley. This road leads to the factories. At that time, they believed that people going to the plant had only positive feelings like joy, pride, and enthusiasm. At the end of the road stands a 1963 sculpture of the metallurgist by sculptor Ivan Nosenko. During the German occupation, it was named Shevchenko Avenue. Later it was renamed Stalin Avenue; and after his death, it got the present name of Metallurgist Avenue. Sobornyi Avenue originally had the name Libkhnet Avenue. "Forty Years of Soviet Ukraine" Street was once called Sovnarkomovska Street and during the German occupation Hitler Alley.

Big Zaporizhzhia

District No. 6 is a small part of the global project called Big Zaporizhzhia. This project was designed for the city, to enable a half-million people to live in seven different areas: Voznesenka, Baburka, Kichkas, Alexandrovsk, Pavlo-Kichkas, Island Khortytsia, and (omitted). Each district must be independent of the others and yet part of а united city. The city line should be stretched along the banks of the Dnieper River for 22 km (14 miles).

=== Dnieper railway bridges ===
The location of the Kichkas Bridge was in the flood zone upstream of the hydroelectric dam. Initially, it was planned to disassemble it and rebuild it in another location. But expert advice was that this was not cost-effective as it was cheaper to build a new bridge.

The building of the hydroelectric dam meant that a new bridge was required to take the railway over the Dnieper. Instead of having a single bridge, as before, it was decided to take the railway over the island Khortytsia. The wide part of the river between Khortytsia and the city is known as the New Dnieper, and the narrower part between Khortytsia and the suburbs on the right bank of the river is known as the Old Dnieper. The New Dnieper was crossed by a three-arch two-tier bridge. Each of the arches spans 140 m (460 ft). When the approach spans are included the total length is 715 m (2,346 ft) weighing 8,480 tonnes (9,350 short tons).

The Old Dnieper was crossed by a single-span arch bridge with a total length of 370 m (1,210 ft); the arch spans of 224 m (735 ft) and was then the largest single-span bridge in Europe. This bridge weighed 5,220 tonnes (5,750 short tons). Both bridges were designed by Professor Streletsky. They were made of riveted steel, and had two tiers: the upper tier for rail traffic and the lower tier for road traffic and pedestrians. They were assembled by a combination of Czechoslovak and Soviet workers under the direction of a Soviet engineer named Konstantinov. The arches are steel made by the Vitkovetskom steel plant in Czechoslovakia, other steelwork was made at the Dnipropetrovsk Metallurgical Plant. The new bridges opened on 6 November 1931. The Kichkas Bridge was demolished afterwards.

=== World War II (1941–1945) ===
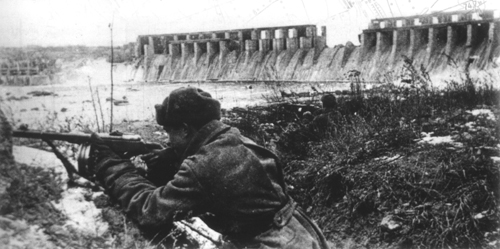
A Red Army soldier near the Dnieper hydro-electric dam

==== German occupation ====
The War between the USSR and Nazi Germany began on 22 June 1941.

After the outbreak of the war, the Soviet government started the evacuation of the industrial equipment from the city to Siberia. The Soviet security forces NKVD shot political prisoners in the city. On 18 August 1941, elements of the German 1st Panzergruppe reached the outskirts of Zaporizhzhia on the right bank and seized the island Khortytsia.

The Red Army blew a 120m x 10m hole in the Dnieper hydroelectric dam (DniproHES) at 16:00 on 18 August 1941, producing a flood wave that swept from Zaporizhzhia to Nikopol, killing local residents as well as soldiers from both sides. "Since no official death toll was released at the time, the estimated number of victims varies widely. Most historians put it at between 20,000 and 100,000, based on the number of people then living in the flooded areas". After two days, the city defenders received reinforcements, and held the left bank of the river for 45 days. During this time people dismantled heavy machinery, packed and loaded them on the railway platform, marked and accounted for with wiring diagrams. Zaporizhstal alone exported 9,600 railway cars with the equipment. Zaporizhzhia was taken on 3 October 1941.

The German occupation of Zaporizhzhia lasted 2 years and 10 days. During this time the Germans shot over 35,000 people, and sent 58,000 people to Germany as forced labour. The Germans used forced labor (mostly POWs) to try to restore the Dnieper hydroelectric dam and the steelworks. Local citizens established an underground resistance organization in spring 1942.

The Krivoy Rog – Stalingrad and Moscow – Crimea railway lines through Zaporizhzhia were important supply lines for the Germans in 1942–43, but the big three-arch Dnieper railway bridge at Zaporizhzhia was blown up by the retreating Red Army on 18 August 1941, with further demolition work done during September 1941. and the Germans did not bring it back into operation until summer 1943. (Note: Lost Victories, by Field Marshal Eric von Manstein, says that the Germans finished repairing the railway bridge only a few months before they lost the city in October 1943. "As a result all goods had to be reloaded and tank-wagons carrying petrol could not go through to the front.")

When the Germans reformed Army Group South in February 1943, it had its headquarters in Zaporizhzhia. The loss of Kharkiv and other cities caused Adolf Hitler to fly to this headquarters on 17 February 1943, where he stayed until 19 February and met the army group commander Field Marshal Erich von Manstein, and was persuaded to allow Army Group South to fight a mobile defence that quickly led to much of the lost ground being recaptured by the Germans in the Third Battle of Kharkov. Hitler visited the headquarters in Zaporizhzhia again on 10 March 1943, where he was briefed by von Manstein and his air force counterpart Field Marshal Wolfram Freiherr von Richthofen. Hitler visited the headquarters at Zaporizhzhia for the last time on 8 September 1943. In mid-September 1943 the Army Group moved its headquarters from Zaporizhzhia to Kirovograd (now called Kropyvnytskyi).

Both the big railway bridge over the New Dnieper and the smaller one over the Old Dnieper were damaged in an air raid by a group of eight Ilyushin Il-2s led by Lieutenant A Usmanov on 21 September 1943.

==== Liberation ====
In mid-August 1943, the Germans started building the Panther-Wotan defence line along the Dnieper from Kyiv to Crimea, and retreated to it in September 1943. The Germans held the city as a bridgehead over the Dnieper with elements of 40th Panzer and 17th Corps. The Soviet Southwestern Front, commanded by Army General Rodion Malinovsky, attacked the city on 10 October 1943. When the defenders succeeding in holding up the attacks, the Red Army reinforced its troops and launched a surprise night attack at 22:00 on 13 October, "laying down a barrage of shellfire bigger than anything... seen to date (it was here that entire 'divisions' of artillery appeared for the first time) and throwing in no fewer than ten divisions strongly supported by armour".

The Red Army broke into the bridgehead, forcing the Germans to abandon it on 14 October. The retreating Germans destroyed the Zaporizhstal steel plant almost completely; they demolished the big railway bridge again, and demolished the turbine building and damaged 32 of the 49 bays of the Dnieper hydro-electric dam. The city has a street between Voznesenskyi and Oleksandrivskyi Districts and a memorial in Oleksandrivskyi District dedicated to Red Army Lieutenant Mykola Yatsenko who commanded the first tank to enter Zaporizhzhia; he and his crew were killed in the battle for the city. (Note: Lieutenant Mykola Yatsenko (1923–1943) was a platoon commander in 39 Tank Brigade (23rd Tank Corps, South-Western Front); early on 14 October 1943 his tank entered the city and destroyed three enemy tanks in street fighting; Yatsenko was killed. He was posthumously made a Hero of the Soviet Union in 1944. His crew members were: Sergeant Varecun (driver), Lebedev (gunner), and Shepelev (radio-operator).)

The Red Army did not recapture the parts of the city on the right bank until 1944.

The rebuilding of the Dnieper hydro-electric dam commenced on 7 July 1944. The first electricity was produced from the restored dam on 3 March 1947.

== Contemporary (1991–present time) ==
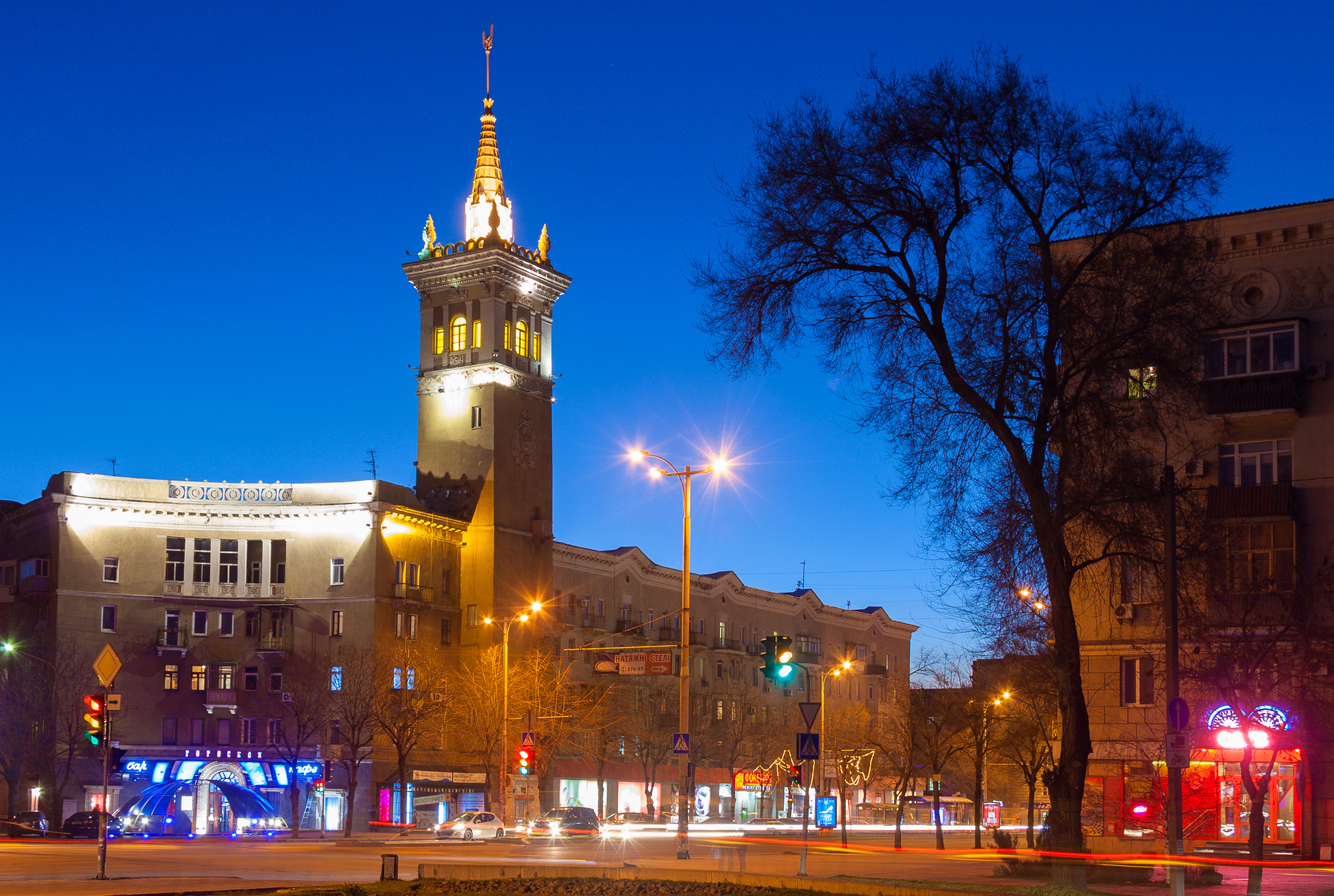
Modern Zaporizhzhia (2015)

=== New bridges across Dnieper ===
The vehicular connection between the right shore city districts and city center via the Zaporizhzhia Arch Bridge and the Preobrazhensky Bridge was heavily congested by the late nineties. In 2004, construction began on new bridges across the Dnieper called the New Zaporizhzhia Dniper Bridge. These bridges are parallel to the existing Preobrazhensky Bridge at a short distance downstream. Construction of the bridges halted soon after it began, and remain untouched due to lack of funding. The project design is dated and needs revising, and the cost of the bridge is estimated to reach ₴8 billion (as opposed to the original ₴2 billion). In mid-November 2020, a Turkish contractor announced that it was starting the final stage of commissioning the first phase of construction. The work was planned to be completed before December.

=== Euromaidan events, 2013–2014 ===
During the 2014 Euromaidan regional state administration occupations protests against President Viktor Yanukovych were also held in Zaporizhzhia. On 23 February 2014 Zaporizhzhia's regional state administration building was occupied by 4,500 protesters, Mid-April 2014 there were clashes between Ukrainian and pro-Russian activists. The Ukrainian activists outnumbered the pro-Russian protesters.

=== Renaming city streets, plants, culture centres (2016) ===
On 19 May 2016, the Verkhovna Rada approved the so-called "Decommunization Law." Due to these laws the city council had to rename more than 50 main streets and the administrative parts of the city (Note: Since modern Zaporizhiazhia was greatly enlarged in the Soviet Union, many typography in the city had to be renamed. In the year of the fall of the Russian Empire (1917), the population of Alexandrovsk was about 60,000 people. In the year of Ukraine's declaration of independence (1991), the city's population reached almost 1 million people.), the monuments of the Soviet Union leaders (Lenin, Felix Dzerzhinsky) were destroyed. The names honoring Soviet leaders in the titles of industrial plants, factories, culture centres and the DniproHES were removed.

=== Russian invasion (2022) ===
During the 2022 Russian invasion of Ukraine, Russian forces have been engaged in ongoing attacks on the city. On 27 February, some fighting was reported in the southern outskirts of Zaporizhzhia. Russian forces began shelling Zaporizhzhia later that evening. On March 3, Russian forces approaching the Zaporizhzhia Nuclear Power Plant were fired upon disabling a tank, and responded causing a fire and concern about a potential nuclear meltdown. Firefighters were able to subdue the fire. Russian military forces fired missiles on Zaporizhzhia on the evening of May 12 and May 13. On 30 September, hours before Russia formally annexed Southern and Eastern Ukraine, the Russian Armed Forces launched S-300 missiles at a civilian convoy, killing 30 people and injuring 88 others. On 9 October, Russian forces launched rockets at residential buildings, killing at least twenty people.
