= Preobrazhensky =

Preobrazhensky (masculine), Preobrazhenskaya (feminine), or Preobrazhenskoye (neuter), literally meaning "of the Transfiguration", may refer to:

People

- Preobrazhensky (surname) (Preobrazhenskaya)

Places

- Preobrazhensky (rural locality) (Preobrazhenskaya, Preobrazhenskoye), several rural localities in Russia
- Preobrazhensky Metro Bridge, the shortest rail bridge in Moscow, Russia
- Preobrazhenskoye District, a district of Eastern Administrative Okrug in the federal city of Moscow, Russia
- Preobrazhenskoye Cemetery, a cemetery in Moscow, Russia
- Preobrazhensky Bridge, a railway and road bridge in Zaporizhzhia, Ukraine

Other

- Preobrazhensky Regiment, one of the oldest regiments of the Imperial Russian army, recreated in 2013 for the Russian Armed Forces
- Preobrazhensky prikaz (ru), an establishment (prikaz) that oversaw the Preobrazhensky and Semyonovsky Regiments in the 18th century
- 154th Preobrazhensky Independent Commandant's Regiment, the official honor guard of the Russian Armed Forces

See also

- Preobrazhenskaya Ploshchad, a Moscow Metro station, Moscow, Russia

== See also ==
- Preobrazhenka (disambiguation)
