= List of bridges in Ukraine =

This is a list of bridges and viaducts in Ukraine, including those for pedestrians and vehicular traffic.

== Historical and architectural interest bridges ==
	Name	Ukrainian	Distinction	Length	Type	Carries Crosses	Opened	Location	Oblast	Ref.
_row_count	Novoplanovsky Bridge	Новопланівський міст	Monument No. 68-104-0160	149 m (489 ft)	Beam bridge Steel	Road bridge Smotrych	1872	Kamianets-Podilskyi; 48°40′39.7″N 26°34′38.8″E	Khmelnytskyi	
_row_count	Vorokhta Viaduct closed	Віадук у Ворохті	Monument No. 26-110-0004	130 m (430 ft)	Masonry; 12 arches	Railway bridge Prut	1895	Vorokhta; 48°16′52.9″N 24°33′52.3″E	Ivano-Frankivsk Oblast	
_row_count	Old iron bridge (Halych)	Старий міст через Дністер	Monument No. 26-212-0016	312 m (1,024 ft)	Truss bridge Steel	Road bridge Dniester	1912	Halych; 49°07′37.9″N 24°43′45.0″E	Ivano-Frankivsk Oblast	

== Major road and railway bridges ==
This table presents the structures with spans greater than 200 meters (non-exhaustive list).

	Name	Ukrainian	Span	Length	Type	Carries Crosses	Opened	Location	Oblast	Ref.
_row_count	Podilskyi Bridge under construction	Подільський міст	344 m (1,129 ft)	4,432 m (14,541 ft)	Arch; 2 levels steel tied-arch	6 lanes road bridge Podilsko-Vyhurivska line Dnieper		Kyiv; 50°28′22.6″N 30°32′05.2″E	Kyiv	
_row_count	Pivnichnyi Bridge	Північний міст	300 m (980 ft)	816 m (2,677 ft)	Cable-stayed; Composite steel/concrete deck, concrete pylon 84+300+5x63	Moskovs'kiy Avenue; Dnieper	1976	Kyiv; 50°29′27.6″N 30°32′11.4″E	Kyiv	
_row_count	Pivdennyi Bridge	Південний міст	271 m (889 ft)	1,256 m (4,121 ft)	Cable-stayed; Composite steel/concrete deck, concrete pylon 90+271+63	M 03; Syretsko–Pecherska line Dnieper	1993	Kyiv; 50°23′41.6″N 30°35′29.1″E	Kyiv	
_row_count	New Zaporizhzhia Dniper Bridge	Новий міст через Дніпро та Старий Дніпро	260 m (850 ft)	660 m (2,170 ft)	Cable-stayed; Steel box girder deck, concrete pylons Twin bridges	6 lanes road bridge Dnieper	2022	Zaporizhzhia; 47°50′33.3″N 35°05′08.1″E	Zaporizhzhia	(Note: The length given only takes into account the main bridge, central span(s) and shore span(s), approach viaducts are not counted.)
_row_count	Zaporizhzhia Bridge	Міст у Запоріжжі	234 m (768 ft)	389 m (1,276 ft)	Arch; 2 levels concrete deck arch	Zaporizhzhia - Nikopol railway line T0806; Dnieper	1952	Zaporizhzhia; 47°49′14.0″N 35°04′29.9″E	Zaporizhzhia	
_row_count	Crimean Rail Bridge	Міст через Керченську протоку	227 m (745 ft)	18,100 m (59,400 ft)	Arch; Steel tied-arch	Bagerovo–Vyshestebliyevskaya railway Kerch Strait	2019	Kerch - Taman; 45°18′30.8″N 36°30′20.6″E	Autonomous Republic of Crimea; Russia	
_row_count	Crimean Road Bridge	Міст через Керченську протоку	227 m (745 ft)	16,900 m (55,400 ft)	Arch; Steel tied-arch	M 17; Kerch Strait	2018	Kerch - Taman; 45°18′31.6″N 36°30′22.5″E	Autonomous Republic of Crimea; Russia	
_row_count	Zaporizhzhia Arch Bridge	Арковий міст у Запоріжжі	196 m (643 ft)	320 m (1,050 ft)	Arch; Steel deck arch	Tahans'ka Street; Dnieper	1974	Zaporizhzhia; 47°51′42.4″N 35°03′43.5″E	Zaporizhzhia	
_row_count	Running Dear Bridge	Мост Бегущая Лань	174 m (571 ft)	379 m (1,243 ft)	Box girder Steel; V-shaped legs	H03; Smotrych	1973	Kamianets-Podilskyi; 48°39′34.9″N 26°34′41.6″E	Khmelnytskyi	
_row_count	Rybalskyi Cable-stayed Bridge closed	Рибальський вантовий міст	144 m (472 ft)	474 m (1,555 ft)	Cable-stayed; Concrete deck and pylons 66+144+66	Dnieper	1964	Kyiv; 50°28′24.8″N 30°31′24.1″E	Kyiv	
_row_count	Preobrazhenskyi Bridge	Мости Преображенського	140 m (460 ft)(x3)	560 m (1,840 ft)	Arch; 2 levels concrete deck arch	Zaporizhzhia - Nikopol railway line T0806; Dnieper	1952	Zaporizhzhia; 47°50′43.6″N 35°05′01.5″E	Zaporizhzhia	
_row_count	Nicholas Chain Bridge demolished in 1920	Миколаївський ланцюговий міст	134 m (440 ft)(x4)	781 m (2,562 ft)	Suspension; Chain bridge, 5 masonry pylons 69+4x134+69	Dnieper	1855	Kyiv; 50°26′32.3″N 30°33′52.7″E	Kyiv	
_row_count	New Zaporizhzhia Dniper Bridge (west bridge)	Новий міст через Дніпро та Старий Дніпро	128 m (420 ft)	340 m (1,120 ft)	Box girder Steel; 106+128+106	6 lanes road bridge Dnieper	2022	Zaporizhzhia; 47°49′09.6″N 35°04′36.9″E	Zaporizhzhia	
_row_count	Kyiv Metro Bridge	Міст Метро	117 m (384 ft)(x2)	684 m (2,244 ft)	Arch; Concrete deck arch	Brovarskyi Avenue; Sviatoshynsko–Brovarska line Dnieper	1965	Kyiv; 50°26′33.6″N 30°33′51.2″E	Kyiv	
_row_count	Odesa Seaport Overpass		115 m (377 ft)	516 m (1,693 ft)	Cable-stayed; Steel deck and pylon		1998	Odesa; 46°29′29.2″N 30°44′21.1″E	Odesa	
_row_count	Petrovski Bridge	Петрівський міст	110 m (360 ft)(x2)	1,430 m (4,690 ft)	Truss bridge Steel	Dnieper	1917	Kyiv; 50°29′01.5″N 30°32′31.7″E	Kyiv	
_row_count	Darnytskyi Railroad Bridge	Дарницький міст	110 m (360 ft)(x3)	1,067 m (3,501 ft)	Arch; Steel through arch	Railway bridge Dnieper	1951	Kyiv; 50°25′02.6″N 30°35′25.5″E	Kyiv	
_row_count	New Darnytskyi Bridge	Новий Дарницький міст	110 m (360 ft)(x3)	1,066 m (3,497 ft)	Arch; Steel tied-arch	Railroad bridge Dnieper	2011	Kyiv; 50°25′01.1″N 30°35′26.1″E	Kyiv	
_row_count	Merefa-Kherson bridge	Мерефо-Херсонський міст	109 m (358 ft)(x2)	1,627 m (5,338 ft)	Arch; Concrete through arch	Merefa-Kherson railway line Dnieper	1932; 1951	Dnipro; 48°28′02.6″N 35°04′58.0″E	Dnipropetrovsk	
_row_count	Kaidatsky Bridge	Кайдацький міст	105 m (344 ft)(x2)	1,732 m (5,682 ft)	Box girder Prestressed concrete 73+2x105+73	M 04; Dnieper	1982	Dnipro; 48°29′46.9″N 34°57′52.3″E	Dnipropetrovsk	
_row_count	Antonivka Road Bridge	Антонівський міст	105 m (344 ft)(x2)	1,366 m (4,482 ft)	Box girder Prestressed concrete 70+2x105+70	M 17; Dnieper	1985	Kherson; 46°40′11.3″N 32°43′12.9″E	Kherson	
_row_count	Rusanivsky Bridge (1906) demolished in 1943	Русанівський міст (1906)	101 m (331 ft)	203 m (666 ft)	Arch; Steel tied-arch	Dnieper	1906	Kyiv; 50°26′51.7″N 30°35′04.9″E	Kyiv	
_row_count	Yevgenii Bosch Bridge demolished in 1941	Міст імені Євгенії Бош			Suspension	Dnieper	1925	Kyiv; 50°26′32.0″N 30°33′52.3″E	Kyiv	

== See also ==
- Bridges in Kyiv
- List of crossings of the Dnieper
- Transport in Ukraine
- Rail transport in Ukraine
- Roads in Ukraine
- Geography of Ukraine

== Notes and references ==
- Notes
- Nicolas Janberg. "International Database for Civil and Structural Engineering". Structurae.com.
- Other references
