= Staryi Dnipro =

Anabranch of the Dniper river in Ukraine

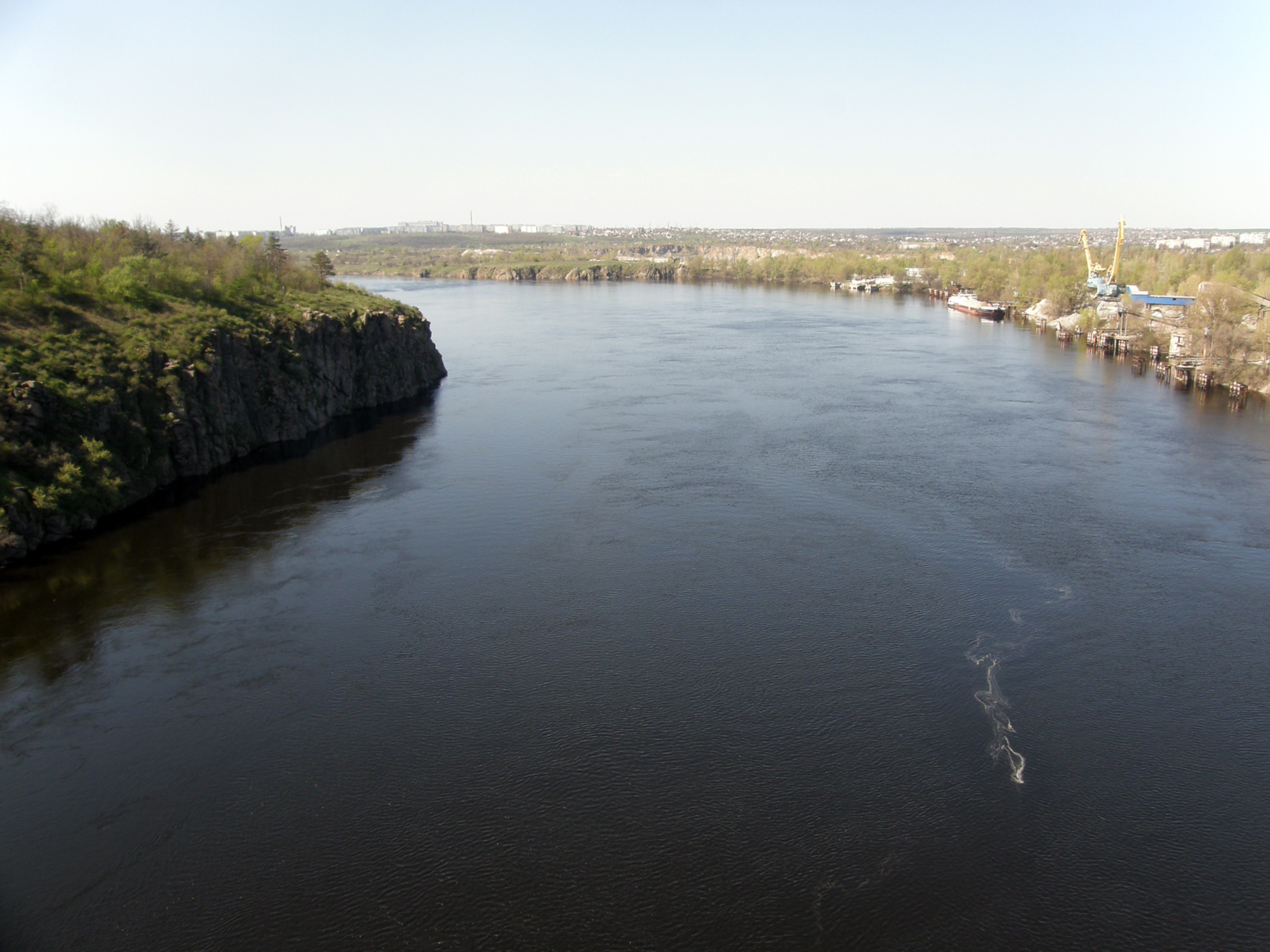
- The Old Dnipro flows downstream from the Ark Bridge in Zaporizhzhia

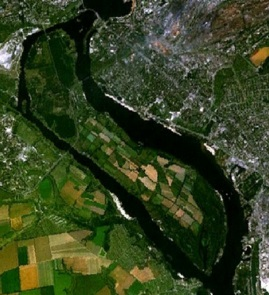
- The island of Khortytsia with the New Dnipro to the right and the Old Dniproto the left

Location
- Country: Ukraine
- City: Zaporizhzhia

Physical characteristics
- Source
  - coordinates: 47°51′50″N 35°04′08″E

The Staryi Dnipro (Ukrainian: Старий Дніпро, lit. 'Old Dnieper') is an anabranch of the Dnieper near Zaporizhzhia that is separated by the island of Khortytsia from the mainstream.

== See also ==
- New Zaporizhzhia Dniper Bridge
- Novyi Dnipro
