= Preobrazhenka =

Preobrazhenka (Russian: Преображенка; Ukrainian: Преображенка) is a placename that may refer to several settlements in East Slavic-speaking countries:

== Russia ==
- Preobrazhenka, Republic of Bashkortostan, a rural locality in Russia
- Preobrazhenka, Belgorod Oblast, a village in Russia
- Preobrazhenka, Irkutsk Oblast, a village in the Katangsky District, Russia

== Ukraine ==
- Preobrazhenka, Zaporizhzhia Oblast, a village in Ukraine
  - Preobrazhenka rural hromada, a hromada of Ukraine with its center in the village

== See also ==
- Preobrazhensky (disambiguation)
- Preobrazhenne
