= Menzhulyuk =

Menzhulyuk Менжулюк
- Khutor
- Location within Belgorod Oblast Location within Russia
- Coordinates: 51°11′N 38°29′E
- Country: Russia
- Region: Belgorod Oblast
- District: Starooskolsky District
- Time zone: UTC+3:00

Menzhulyuk (Russian: Менжулюк) is a rural locality (a khutor) in Starooskolsky District, Belgorod Oblast, Russia. The population was 71 as of 2010. There are 2 streets.

== Geography ==
Menzhulyuk is located 59 km southeast of Stary Oskol (the district's administrative centre) by road. Preobrazhenka is the nearest rural locality.
