= Preobrazhensky (rural locality) =

Preobrazhensky (Russian: Преображенский; masculine), Preobrazhenskaya (Преображенская; feminine), or Preobrazhenskoye (Преображенское; neuter) is the name of several rural localities in Russia:

- Preobrazhensky, Krasnoyarsk Krai, a settlement in Nazarovsky District of Krasnoyarsk Krai
- Preobrazhensky, Novosibirsk Oblast, a settlement in Chulymsky District of Novosibirsk Oblast
- Preobrazhensky, name of several other rural localities
- Preobrazhenskaya, Republic of Bashkortostan, a village in Iglinsky District of the Republic of Bashkortostan
- Preobrazhenskaya, Volgograd Oblast, a stanitsa in Kikvidzensky District of Volgograd Oblast
- Preobrazhenskaya, name of several other rural localities
- Preobrazhenskoye, Republic of Adygea, a selo in Krasnogvardeysky District of the Republic of Adygea
- Preobrazhenskoye, Ivanovo Oblast, a selo in Yuzhsky District of Ivanovo Oblast
- Preobrazhenskoye, name of several other rural localities

Abolished inhabited localities

- Preobrazhenskoye, Kamchatka Oblast, a selo in Aleutsky District of Kamchatka Oblast; abolished in the 1960s
