= Zaporizhzhia Pylon Triple =

Set of electricity pylons in Zaporizhzhia, Ukraine

Coordinates: 47°51′13″N 35°4′41″E

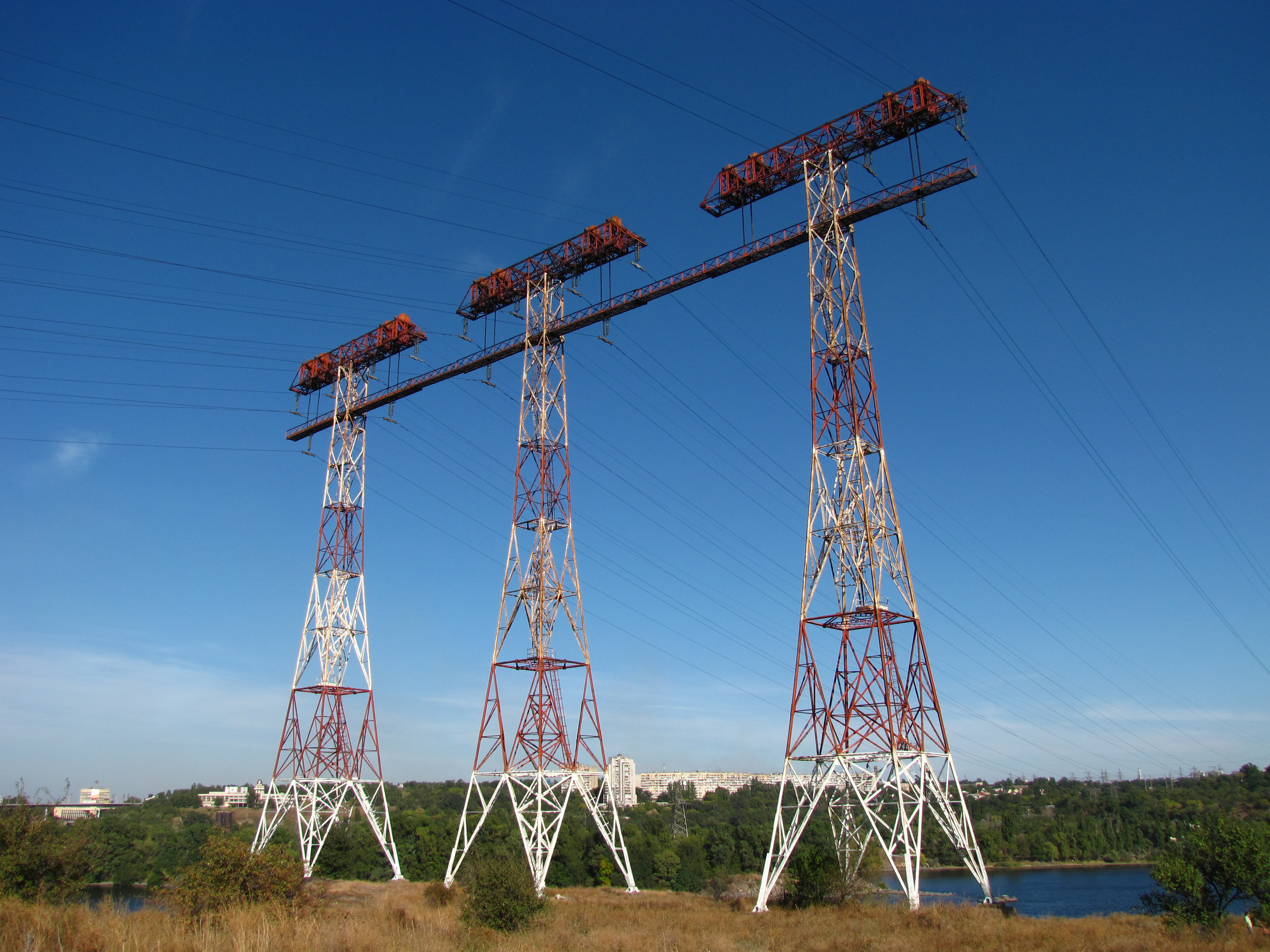
Zaporizhzhia Pylon Triple on Khortytsia island

The Zaporizhzhia Pylon Triple is a set of two triples of 74.5 metres (244 ft) tall electricity pylons extending over the Dnieper river standing on a 27m rock in Zaporizhzhia, Ukraine. They are used for the transport of electricity generated at the Dnieper Hydroelectric Station over a span of 900 metres from Khortytsia island to the east bank of the Dnieper. The two triples are an unofficial landmark of Zaporizhzhia.

== History ==
The powerline crossingwas built between 1930 and 1932. It consisted originally of four towers at each end of the span, interconnected by a gangway equipped a railing at a height of 63.5 metres (208 ft). In World War II both sets of towers were destroyed or dismantled.

Between 1945 and 1949 the pylons were rebuilt using the old foundations. However, only three towers were built at each end of the span. The unused foundation, on which the fourth tower on Khortytsia island stood, still exists.

== Configuration ==
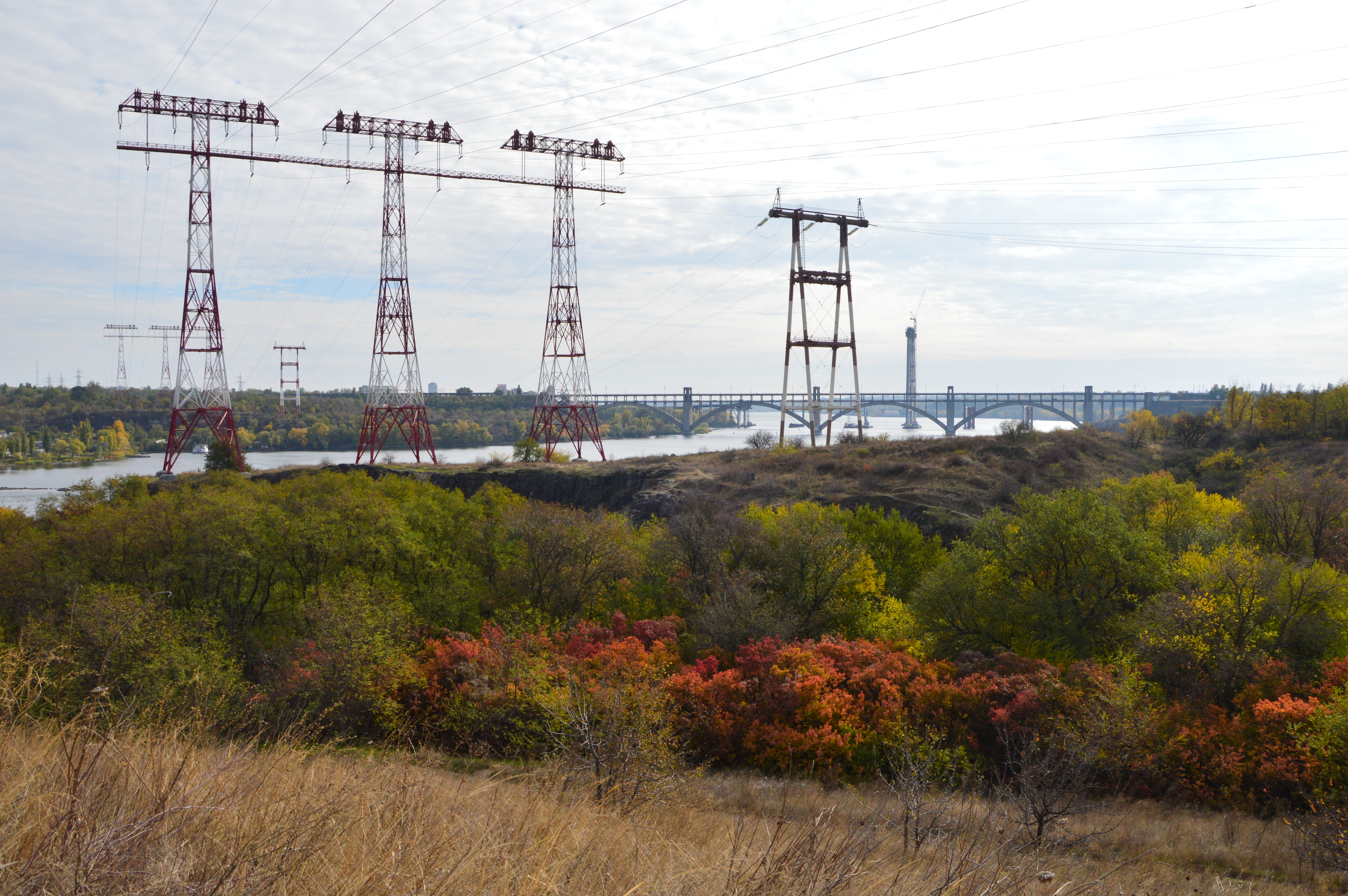
A triple carrying five circuits and a separate sixth circuit to the right on Khortytsia island

Each pylon has a single crossarm designed to carry six conductors. However, only four conductors, two at the edge and two near the pylon, are installed there. From the middle of each crossbar, half a support structure runs down to the gangway. At this point on the underside of the gangway the insulator carrying the middle conductor is fixed.

Although the triples are capable of carrying 18 conductors for six 150 kV-circuits, there are only five circuits at present. A sixth circuit runs parallel to the triple on a new tubular steel monopolar powerline tower.

All towers of both triples are painted red and white and equipped with a ladder.
