= Preobrazhensky Bridge =

Preobrazhensky Bridge Мости Преображенського
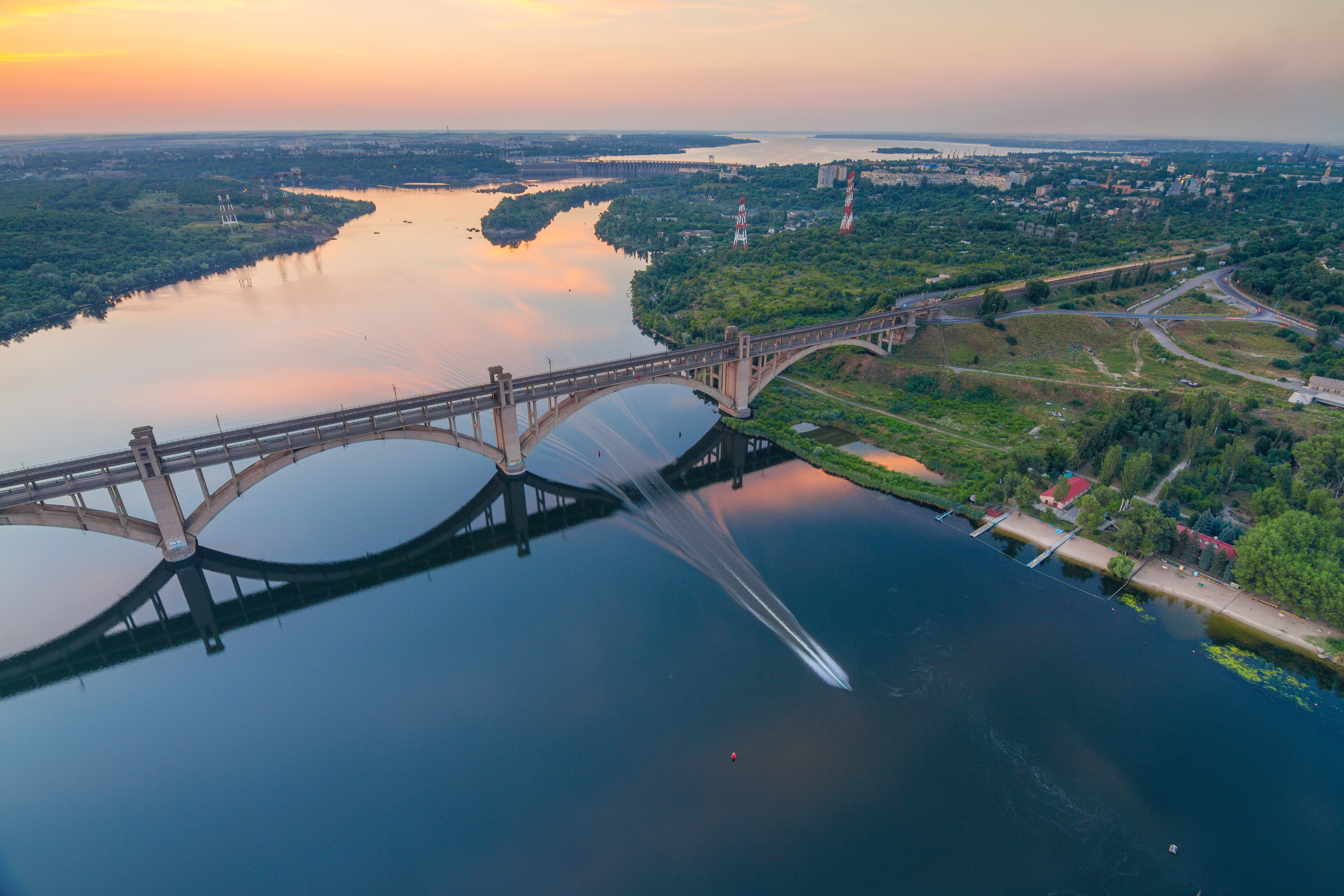
- Coordinates: 47.5042°N 35.0500°E
- Carries: Automobiles and Railway
- Crosses: Dnieper River
- Locale: Zaporizhzhia, Ukraine

Characteristics
- Design: Arched Bridge
- Material: Concrete
- Total length: 560 metres (1,840 ft) and 228 metres (748 ft)
- Width: 15 metres (49 ft)
- Height: 54 metres (177 ft)
- Clearance below: 54 metres (177 ft)
- No. of lanes: 2

History
- Engineering design by: Borys Preobrazhenskyi
- Constructed by: Ukrainian SSR
- Construction start: 1949
- Opened: December 31, 1952

The Preobrazhensky Bridge is a two bridge crossing over the Dnipro River in the city of Zaporizhzhia, Ukraine. Construction on the bridges began in the spring of 1949 and was completed in 1952. The official opening took place on December 31, 1952. Due to the lack of high-tech steel in the early post-war years, the bridges were built from reinforced concrete. The bridges are named after the engineer Borys Preobrazhenskyi. The railway and highway which run over the bridge connect the Khortytskyi District with the Zaporizhzhia city center.

== History ==
On January 3, 1944, construction of temporary post-war bridges began in Zaporizhzhia. Shortly after the expulsion of the Germans from the territory of Khortytsia and the right bank, construction of temporary bridge crossings began which allowed for railway service between Zaporizhzhia and Nikopol while permanent bridges were constructed.

Embankments were built on the left and right banks and on the island of Khortytsia to facilitate the construction of both temporary and permanent bridges. During this time, 14 km of railway track was laid, and temporary bridges with a total length of 1,886 meters were built across both channels of the Dnieper. Before the start of construction, 10,000 mines laid on Khortytsia were defused by sappers.

Construction of the permanent embankment on Khortytsia Island was conducted manually. The southern part of the dam was connected to a wooden bridge across the flood channels and the Dnipro, the length of this bridge was 1,330 meters. More than 1,500 piles alone were driven to support the wooden bridge. The supports of the temporary bridge were made of sleepers and logs impregnated with a special composition. Wooden trusses were attached to them, a floor made of beams was laid on top and railway tracks were laid. The second bridge, which connected the western part of the embankment on Khortytsia Island with the right bank, was 556 meters long and was built in just 12 days. The construction of the bridges over the Dnieper was completed on February 20, 1944, and on February 23, 1944, the first train crossed both bridges thus restoring connection between the east and west banks of the Dnieper.

These temporary bridges served Zaporizhzhia for almost 9 years. They were dismantled in December 1952 upon the completion and opening of the new Preobrazhensky Bridge.

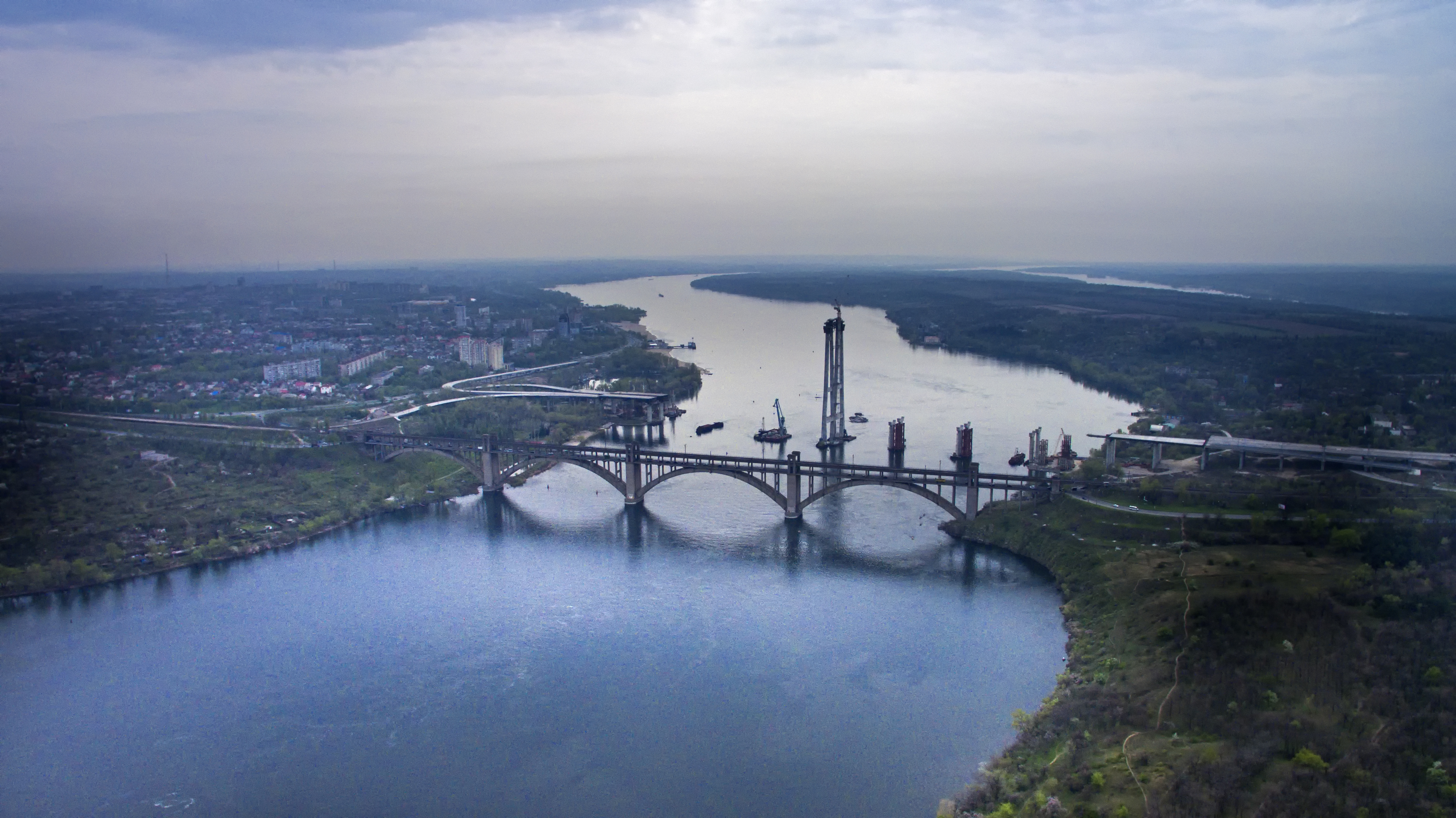
The Preobrazhensky Bridge and neighboring New Zaporizhzhia Dniper Bridge pictured in 2016

== Architecture ==
Preobrazhensky Bridge I is four-arch double-decker bridge across the new channel of the Dnieper. The length of the bridge is 560 meters, the height is 54 meters. Preobrazhensky II is a single-arch two-story bridge across the old channel of the Dnieper. The length of the bridge is 228 meters. The bridge was the longest arch bridge in Ukraine until the construction of the Zaporizhzhia Arch Bridge in 1974. Bridge vaults on both structures are designed for the joint impact of railway and motor vehicle loads. The combination of arch structures with verticals of powerful reinforced concrete supports plays an important role in the aesthetic appearance of bridges which are considered a landmark in Zaporizhzhia.

== Modern Operation ==
The Preobrazhensky bridges were primarily built as a road and railway crossing across the Dniper and were supposed to connect Kryvyi Rih with Donbas. At that time of their construction, cars were not as prominent in Ukraine, so bridges were built with one lane of traffic in either direction. However, over the past seventy years, a large residential population in the Khortytskyi District materialized, part of larger regional population growth that defined the post-war years in Zaporizhzhia. Due to the increases in traffic and freight loads, conditions on both of the bridges deteriorated. Both bridges are struggling with issues related to waterproofing and expansion joints deterioration. Due to their narrow configuration, the bridges are consistently congested and experience long lines of traffic at either end waiting to conduct their crossing. Roadways connecting the bridge to Zaporizhzhia city center and Khortytskyi District were informally designed, poorly maintained and are prone to crashes.

Deteriorating conditions on the bridge paired with issues related to traffic congestion triggered the design and construction of a new and modern bridge with significantly greater vehicular capacity directly to the south of the existing bridges. New Zaporizhzhia Dniper Bridge is a twin-span suspension bridge that began construction in 2004 and has been plagued with delays. The first deck of the bridge opened for public use in 2022. When completed, the New Zaporizhzhia Dniper Bridge will have 9 km of modern closed access highway connecting the center of Zaporizhzhia and Khortytskyi District and in doing so significantly reduce reliance on the aging Preobrazhensky Bridges and travel times between the districts.

=== Russo-Ukrainian War ===
On April 21, 2022, during the Russian invasion of Ukraine (2022) Russian cruise missiles fell on Khortytsia Island near the bridge. At that time, a train with evacuees leaving Zaporizhzhia for Lviv was traveling on the bridge. Windows on the train were blown out as a result of the strike. Later that same day, the Russians struck the area with a second missile, which also hit Khortytsia Island. As a result, 8 citizens on the island were injured. The regional military-civilian administration reported that "the enemy once again tried to damage the infrastructure of the city of Zaporizhzhia by means of rocket attacks." It is believed that the bridge was the intended target of Russian forces fighting in Ukraine.
