= Preobrazhensky (surname) =

Preobrazhensky (Russian: Преображенский) feminine: Preobrazhenskaya is a Russian surname originated in clergy, derived from the term Преображение, 'Transfiguration (of Jesus)'. Notable persons with the surname include:

- Boris Preobrazhensky (1937–2016), Soviet otolaryngologist and academician, Hero of Socialist Labour
- Konstantin Preobrazhensky, writer on KGB subjects
- Mikhail Preobrazhensky, architect
- Nina Preobrazhenskaya (born 1956), Soviet rower
- Olga Preobrajenska (1871–1962), ballerina of the Russian Imperial Ballet
- Olga Preobrazhenskaya (director) (1881–1971), Russian and Soviet actress and film director
- Pavel Preobrazhensky (1874–1944), Russian geologist
- Sofya Preobrazhenskaya (1904–1966), Russian opera singer, People's Artist of the USSR
- Yevgeni Preobrazhensky, (1886–1937) Bolshevik and economist

== Fictional characters ==
- Professor Preobrazhensky, surgeon, from the novel Heart of a Dog by Mikhail Bulgakov and its adaptations
