= Preobrazhenka, Republic of Bashkortostan =

Preobrazhenka Преображенка
- Village
- Location within Bashkortostan Location within Russia
- Coordinates: 54°42′N 56°48′E
- Country: Russia
- Region: Bashkortostan
- District: Iglinsky District
- Time zone: UTC+5:00

Preobrazhenka (Russian: Преображенка) is a rural locality (a village) in Austrumsky Selsoviet, Iglinsky District, Bashkortostan, Russia. The population was 15 as of 2010. There is 1 street.

== Geography ==
Preobrazhenka is located 47 km southeast of Iglino (the district's administrative centre) by road. Pyatiletka is the nearest rural locality.
