= New Zaporizhzhia Dniper Bridge =

New Zaporizhzhia Dniper Bridge Новий міст через Дніпро та Старий Дніпро
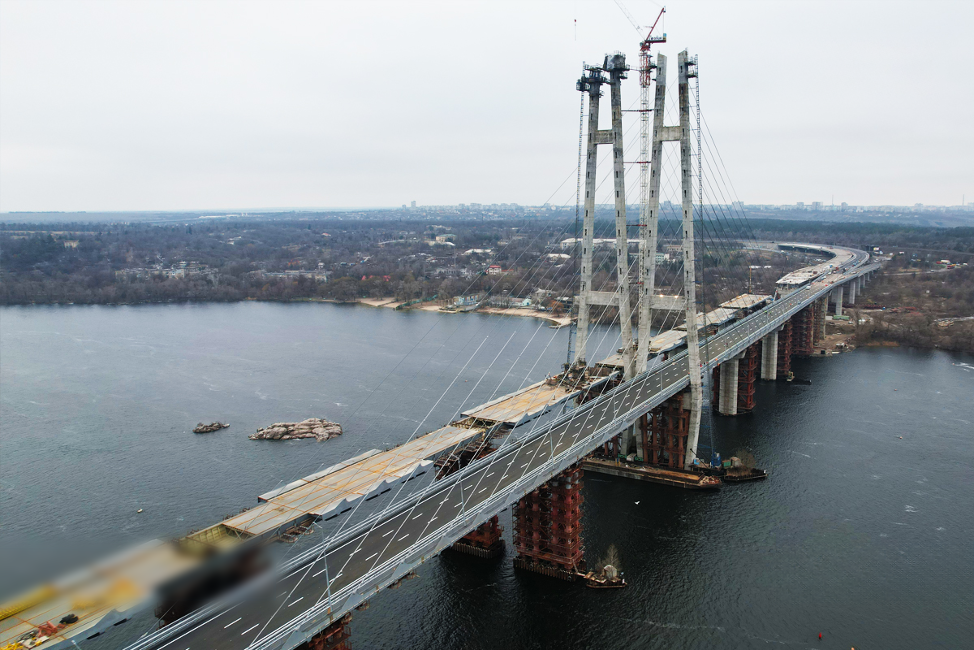
- Bridge in 2022.
- Coordinates: 47.8426°N 35.0855°E
- Carries: Automobiles
- Crosses: Dnieper River
- Locale: Zaporizhzhia, Ukraine

Characteristics
- Design: Cable-strayed bridge
- Material: Concrete
- Total length: 5,600 metres (18,400 ft)
- Width: 51.3 metres (168 ft)
- Height: 151 metres (495 ft)
- Clearance below: 24.4 metres (80 ft)
- No. of lanes: 7

History
- Architect: Oleg Zavarzin
- Engineering design by: Ivan Panasiuk, Mykhailo Korniev, Olga Sergeeva
- Constructed by: JSC Kyivsoyuzshlyakhproekt, Onur Taahhut Tasimacilik Insaat Tic. ve Sanayi A.S.
- Construction start: 30 August 2004
- Opened: 22 January 2022

Location
- Interactive map of New Zaporizhzhia Dniper Bridge

The New Zaporizhzhia Dniper Bridge is a controlled-access highway bridge currently under construction in Zaporizhzhia, Ukraine. Construction of the bridge began in August 2004 with the first span of the bridge opened for public vehicular use in January 2022 after several years of delays. The bridge was opened in a public ceremony on 22 January 2022, by President Volodymyr Zelenskyy. When completed, the bridge will stand at the height of 151 meters, making it the tallest in Ukraine and the eighth tallest in Europe.

== Project overview ==
The bridge consists of two spans that forms a 5.6 km (3.5 mi) long continuous highway connecting the east and west banks of the Dnieper at Zaporizhzhia. The highway and bridge project consists of six interchanges, a central two-deck bridge span and 27 overpasses. Construction on the bridge and bypass project began on 30 August 2004 with the westbound deck of the bridge completed in 2022 and opened for public use. Construction on the eastbound deck of the bridge was halted in February 2022 as a result of the 2022 Russian Invasion of Ukraine. The total cost of the project is estimated to be 11.9 billion Hryvnia ($460 million).

Prior to the completion of the bridge, there were only two crossings over the Dnieper in Zaporizhzhia Oblast. Both crossings were located in the city of Zaporizhzhia. The two crossings were the dam Dnieper Hydroelectric Station and the Preobrazhensky Bridge. The nearest alternative crossing is the Southern Bridge in neighboring Dnipro. As of April 2024, the bridge is open to vehicular use in both direction.

== Project history ==
The bridge was conceived as a project that would connect the east and west banks of the Dnieper by running through Khortytsia Island. The project concept was included in the Zaporizhzhia 1965 to 1985 City Master Plan. In 1980, Soyuzdorproekt and the Dniprograd Institute developed a feasibility study for a new bridge crossing. The state declined to implement it in the 12th Five-Year Plan due to environmental concerns related to the ecology of Khortytsia Island. In 1987, a design for the bridge was completed and approved over those objections by the Council of Ministers of the USSR. The project plan entailed the new bridge running parallel to the Preobrazhensky Bridge and crossing the southern portion of Khortytsia Island.

In 1997, after the dissolution of the Soviet Union and the formation of an independent Ukraine, the Zaporizhzhia City Council adopted a new master plan for the city which designated a route with a bridge over the Dnieper near Khortytsia Island. By 2003, a feasibility study for the project was approved by the Cabinet of Ministers of Ukraine. Per the approved plan, the total length of the highway would be9.1 km (5.7 mi), of which 660 metres (2,170 ft) would span across the Dnieper. Per this approved plan, the new bridge was to be completed by 2011 at a cost of 1.9 billion Hryvnia (US$356 million). Construction of the bridge began in 2004. Then Mayor of Zaporizhzhia Yevhen Kartashov congratulated contractors on the first day of work. He participated in the driving of the first pylon of the project. Construction came to a halt shortly after beginning.

In 2010, 6 years after the start of construction, the government approved amendments to the project which increased the planned length of the bridge by 80 meters. As a result of the design change, the projected opening of the bridge postponed to 2013 and the cost of construction increased to 5.3 billion Hryvnia ($664 million). In 2014, construction of the bridge was halted due to the cancellation of funding. By the time of the cancellation, 2.4 billion Hryvnia had been spent on the bridge construction. In 2015, the project had a revised estimated cost of 6.6 billion Hryvnia ($302 million). Within a year of the cost revision, the project resumed and construction of a new bridge in Zaporizhzhia and the state provided an additional 250 million Hryvnia in funding.

In 2017, work on the bridge was halted due to design and engineering concerns. Work on the bridge resumed in 2018 with the east bank of Zaporizhzhia and the island of Khortytsia finally connected by 450 m of bridge deck. As a result of frustration around delays in completing the bridge, a protest was held to commemorate the 15th anniversary of construction starting. The event took place on an unfinished portion of bridge deck over the Dnieper. Activists erected a sign on the east bank portion of the structure with an appeal to the Ministry of Infrastructure of Ukraine to complete the construction.

In late 2019, the State Agency of Automobile Roads of Ukraine and China Road and Bridge Corporation (CRBC) signed a Memorandum of Cooperation aimed completing the project. The Prime Minister of Ukraine Oleksiy Honcharuk paid a working visit to Zaporizhzhia in 2019, during which he visited the unfinished bridges and said that the bridge work will be completed in 2 to 3 years. Work stalled again months later. The Ministry of Infrastructure of Ukraine estimated that the completion of the new New Zaporizhzhia Dniper Bridge would cost a total of 12 billion Hryvnia. With this revised cost estimate, the ministry determined it necessary to allocate an additional 5 billion Hryvnia to complete the project. China Road and Bridge Corporation (CBRC) plans to invest $550 million.

In 2020, as part of the national "Great Construction" program initiated by the President of Ukraine Volodymyr Zelenskyy, work again began on the bridge. In February 2020, The auction site "Prozorro" hosted an auction, which was won by the Turkish company Onur Taahhut Tasimacilik Insaat Tic. ve Sanayi A.S. On April 10, 2020, the State Architectural and Construction Inspectorate of Ukraine issued a permit to resume construction work. In December 2020, a bridge crossing test was conducted. The test was supervised by two groups of surveyors from the contractor Onur Taahut and from the independent technical supervision of the Austrian company 1C-Consulenten.

In July 2021, the floating crane "Zachary" installed the fifth section of the bridge deck. By the end of July, the installation of the last sixth bridge deck section weighing 700 tons and spanning 80 meters long was completed. With the conclusion of this work, a total of 660 meters of bridge deck was erected. The following month, contractors began concreting cable-stayed pylons on the bridge. On the eve of Day of the National Flag and on the occasion of the 30th anniversary of Independence of Ukraine, the cable-stayed bridge in Zaporizhzhia was draped in the Ukrainian flag. In October 2021, The Zaporizhzhia Oblast Highway Service organized a public hearing on naming a beam bridge in Zaporizhzhia after Oleksandr Shandyb, the former deputy head of the Zaporizhzhia Highway Service, who initially led the construction of the bridge.

By October 2021, most sections of the bridge deck connecting the two banks of the Dnieper River were completed and work began to install the cables. In December, a press event took place to celebrate the construction of the tenth highway across the Dnieper in the city of Zaporizhzhia. The Road Service of Ukraine implemented a project of architectural decoration of pylons, cables and other elements of the bridge with modern and bright LED lighting in the national colors. Bridge builders then installed the last section of the lower part of the cable-stayed bridge, which is mounted from water. The non-self-propelled floating crane LK-800 "Zachary" delivered a section from the construction site. This was the last work of the LK-800 "Zachary" crane on the New Zaporizhzhia Dniper Bridge.

In early January 2022, the contractor began the penultimate stage of work – the installation of expansion joints. One span of the bridge is now open to public use. Work is currently on hold on the second deck of the bridge due to the 2022 Russian invasion of Ukraine.

== Opening ==
On 24 December 2020, the bridge was opened to westbound traffic, leading from Khortytskyi District to the island Khortytsya, across the river Dnieper. A temporary traffic plan was put in place in connection with the opening of the westbound bridge. In January 2022, residents of Zaporizhzhia joined a flash mob called "Living Chain" on the occasion of the Day of Unity of Ukraine. The bridge opened to vehicle traffic at 16:00 Kyiv time.

Construction is ongoing with a contractual expectation that both bridge spans must be completed by 2024 according to Andriy Ivko, Deputy Head of Ukravtodor. Due to 2022 Russian invasion of Ukraine, work on the bridge has been halted and no completion date has been announced.

== See also ==
- Zaporizhzhia Arch Bridge
- Dnieper Hydroelectric Station

== Notes ==
https://www.architectmagazine.com/project-gallery/new-automobile-bridge-over-the-dnieper-river-in-zaporizhia-ukraine

== Sources ==
- У Запоріжжі Зеленський відкрив найбільший в Україні вантовий міст// Голос України, 22.01.2022
- «Пам’ятник української корупції» перетворився на здійснену мрію: чим особливий міст у Запоріжжі // Mintrsns.news 24.01.2022
