= Preobrazhenskaya, Republic of Bashkortostan =

Preobrazhenskaya Преображенская
- Village
- Location within Bashkortostan Location within Russia
- Coordinates: 54°36′N 56°22′E
- Country: Russia
- Region: Bashkortostan
- District: Iglinsky District
- Time zone: UTC+5:00

Preobrazhenskaya (Russian: Преображенская) is a rural locality (a village) in Ivano-Kazansky Selsoviet, Iglinsky District, Bashkortostan, Russia. The population was 80 as of 2010. There are 5 streets.

== Geography ==
Preobrazhenskaya is located 31 km south of Iglino (the district's administrative centre) by road. Ivano-Kazanka is the nearest rural locality.
