= Preobrazhenka, Belgorod Oblast =

Preobrazhenka Преображенка
- Selo
- Location within Belgorod Oblast Location within Russia
- Coordinates: 51°10′N 38°29′E
- Country: Russia
- Region: Belgorod Oblast
- District: Starooskolsky District
- Time zone: UTC+3:00

Preobrazhenka (Russian: Преображенка) is a rural locality (a selo) in Starooskolsky District, Belgorod Oblast, Russia. The population was 124 as of 2010. There are 3 streets.

== Geography ==
Preobrazhenka is located 58 km southeast of Stary Oskol (the district's administrative centre) by road. Menzhulyuk is the nearest rural locality.
