= Zaporizhzhia Arch Bridge =

Zaporizhzhia Arch Bridge Арковий міст у Запоріжжі
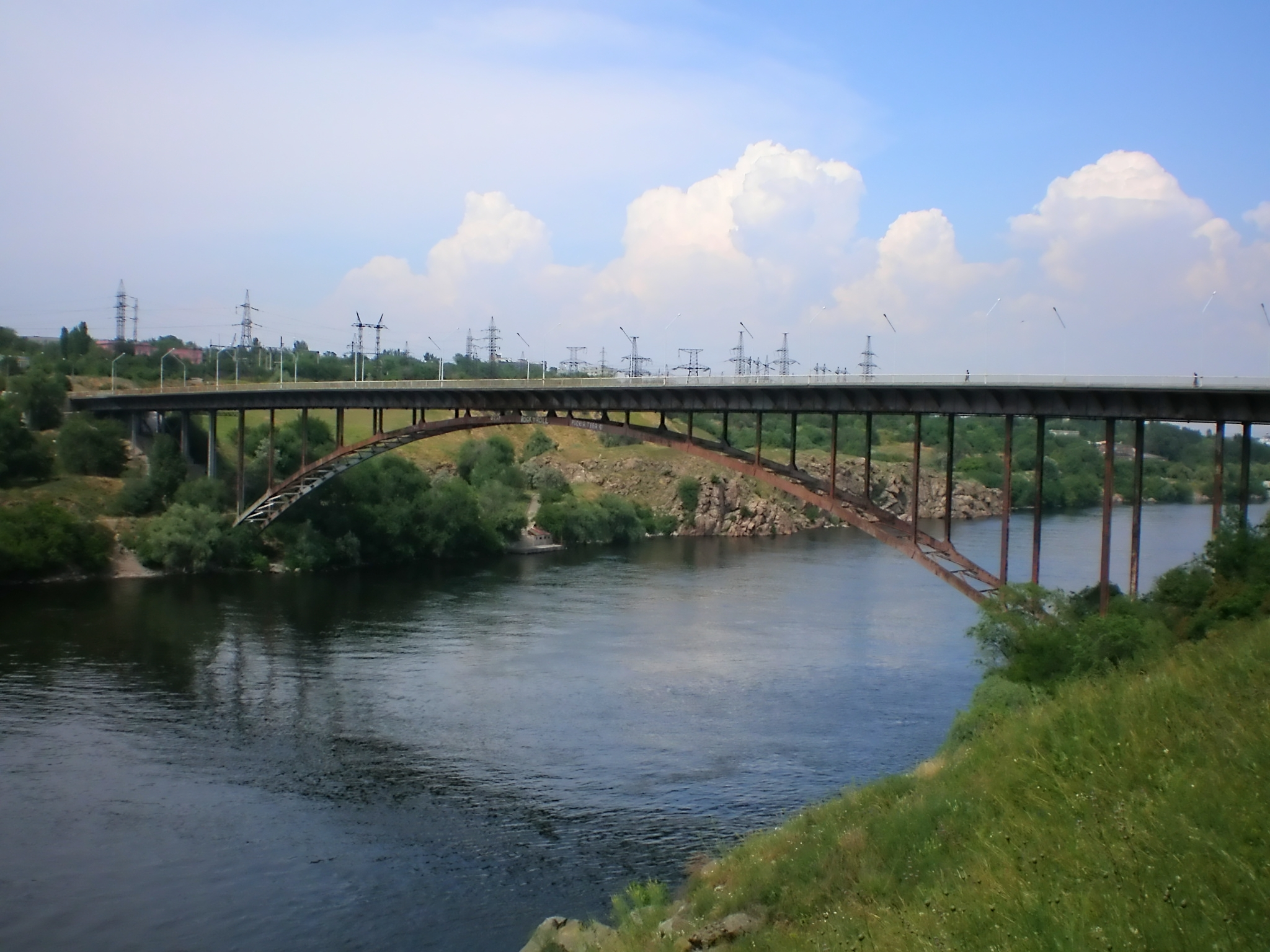
- Coordinates: 47°51′42″N 35°03′44″E
- Carries: Automobiles
- Crosses: Dnieper
- Locale: Zaporizhzhia, Ukraine

Characteristics
- Design: arch bridge
- Total length: 320 m
- Width: 20 m
- Height: 40 m
- Longest span: 205 m

History
- Constructed by: "Mostostroi" (Ministry of Transport Construction of the USSR)
- Construction start: 1970
- Construction cost: 3,220,000 rubles
- Opened: 1974

Statistics
- Daily traffic: 2 way (2 lanes each way)

Location
- Interactive map of Zaporizhzhia Arch Bridge

Zaporizhzhia Arch Bridge (Ukrainian: Арковий міст у Запоріжжі) is the longest arch bridge in Ukraine. The bridge connects the west bank area of Zaporizhzhia with the north side of Khortytsia Island by spanning the smaller eastern branch of the River Dnieper.

== History ==
In 1970, the construction of the DniproHES-2 hydroelectric plant began. The plans called for the project to take 10 years. When at full pace, the movement of construction materials from the Khortytskyi District of Zaporizhzhia on the west bank of the Dnipner, to the construction site, would produce too much traffic for the temporary bridge, built after World War II, to handle. In addition, during the construction of DniproHES-2, the road on top of the dam would be blocked, which would also increase the traffic on the temporary bridge.

For these reasons, architectural and engineering plans were drawn up for a new permanent bridge. The new bridge would span from the western bank of the Dnieper to the northern side of the mid-river island Khortytsia. It would provide access to the Preobrazhensky Bridge near the southeast end of the island, which crossed the wider east channel of the Dnieper.

Construction began on 21 April 1971, and took until 1974 to complete. It began on the west bank in the Khortytskyi District. The construction contractor was a trust, the Urban Development Office of the Upper-Dnieper basin of the Ministry of Transport Construction of the USSR.

The bridge is a single-arch, steel frame. The steel frame was produced at the Dnieper Steel Frame Factory. The assembly and installation were conducted by the Construction Bridge Brigade #12, led by Precinct Chief Zalyubovsky. By 1973 the Bridge Brigade had assembled, and installed, over 200 tonnes of the steel frame.

The Zaporizhzhia Arch Bridge was the first Soviet bridge to be constructed by fully assembling the deck truss on barges, and on the two river banks. Then the 205 meters (673 ft)-long steel-truss was hoisted into place atop the arch as a single unit.

Upon completion of installation, testing of the bridge's load-bearing structures began. Testing was conducted by a staff of the Bridge Dynamics Laboratory of the Dnipropetrovsk Institute of Transport Engineers (today part of the Dnieper National University of Rail Transport). The bridge span over the arch above the river was tested first. Then the two portions on either bank, not above the arch, were tested. The tests consisted of 50 dump trucks, each loaded to weigh 25 tonnes, and driven into place one at a time until the full test load of 1,250 tonnes was achieved. Monitoring gauges were installed on elements of the steel structure to measure, and record, the load values, and the deformation of the elements.

The trolleybus line across Khortytsia Island, in addition to the Arch Bridge, passed through the Preobrazhenskyi Bridge. It was closed in 2001, when the Arch Bridge was under reconstruction, and the contact network was dismantled to protect it from theft. After the opening of the Arch Bridge in 2003, the restoration of the trolleybus line was deemed inexpedient.

On September 13, 2019, route 1 (Square of Trade Unions - Khortytsia Tourist Camp) was opened, with Dnipro T203 trolleybuses with the option of autonomous operation. Since February 25, 2022, the operation of trolleybus route No. 1 has been temporarily suspended due to the large-scale Russian invasion of Ukraine, so Dnipro T203 trolleybuses that served this route were redirected from March 1, 2022, to serve a new route connecting the 4th Southern District with the 2nd Shevchenkivskyi District.
