= Khortytsia =

River island and national park in Ukraine

Native name: Хортиця (Ukrainian)
- Location within Zaporizhzhia Oblast Location within Ukraine

Geography
- Location: Dnieper River
- Coordinates: 47°49′12″N 35°06′00″E
- Area: 23.59 km^{2} (9.11 sq mi)
- Length: 12.5 km (7.77 mi)
- Width: 2.5 km (1.55 mi)
- Highest elevation: 30 m (100 ft)
- Highest point: N/A

Administration
- Ukraine
- Oblast: Zaporizhzhia Oblast
- City: Zaporizhzhia
- District: Voznesenivskyi District

Khortytsia (Ukrainian: Хортиця, pronounced [ˈxɔrtɪtsʲɐ]), historically known as St George Island, (Note: Named after Gregory the Illuminator.; Ukrainian: острів Святого Григорія; ostriv Sviatoho Hryhoriia, alternatively; острів Святого Георгія; ostriv Sviatoho Heorhiia.) is the largest island on the Dnieper River, and is 12.5 km (7.77 mi) long and up to 2.5 km (1.55 mi) wide. The island forms part of the Khortytsia National Reserve. This historic site is located within the city limits of Zaporizhzhia, Ukraine.

The island has played an important role in the history of Ukraine, especially in the history of the Zaporozhian Cossacks. The island has unique flora and fauna, including oak groves, spruce woods, meadows, and steppe. The northern part of the island is very rocky and high (rising 30 m or 98 ft above the river bed) in comparison to the southern part, which is low, and often flooded by the waters of the Dnieper.

== Geography and location ==
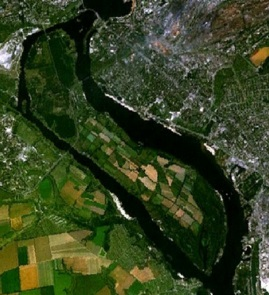
The island from space

Zaporizhzhia (direct translation is "beyond the rapids") takes its name from a geographic area downstream of the Dnieper river past the ninth rapid (see Dnieper rapids). In the 1930s, when the Dnieper Hydroelectric Station was built, these rapids were flooded. Only granite cliffs, rising to the height of 50 m (160 ft), testify to the original rocky terrain of the region. To the south of Khortytsia is the Great Meadow, which was flooded from 1950s until 2023 by the Kakhovka Reservoir.

On Khortytsia at Savutyn summit, near a ravine of the same name, are three 74.5-metre-tall (244 ft) electrical transmission towers, called Zaporizhzhia Pylon Triple, which are part of a 150 kV powerline crossing the Dnieper river.

== History ==
=== Earliest references ===
There are a number of theories concerning the origin of the name Khortytsia, one of the more likely one is that the island was named in honour of the ancient Slavic god Khors.

Khortytsia has been continuously inhabited during the last five millennia. Other islands in the immediate vicinity also contain indications of intensive occupation during the Proto-Indo-European and Scythian periods. The island of Small Khortytsia is known for its Scythian remains and a derelict Cossack fortress. The islet of Sredeny Stih (to the northeast of Khortytsia), excavated during construction of the hydroelectric station in 1927, gave its name to the Sredny Stog culture.

In his treatise De Administrando Imperio (written c. 950), Emperor Constantine VII mentions the island of St. George immediately downstream from the rapids. He reports that, while passing through the rapids, the Rus' would be easy prey for the nomadic Pechenegs. The Kievan Rus' prince Sviatoslav I was attacked and killed during his attempt to cross the rapids in 972.

The island is mentioned once in the Primary Chronicle (PVL, 277.27–278.3) under the year 6611 (1103) in the context of a military campaign against the Polovtsi after the 1103 Council of Dolobsk by Sviatopolk II and Monomakh:

"They advanced on horseback and by boat, arrived below the cataracts, and halted by the rapids at the island of Khortitsa [въ Хъртичемъ островѣ, vŭ Khŭrtichemŭ ostrově]. They then mounted their horses, and when the foot-soldiers had disembarked from the boats, they traveled across country for four days, and arrived at Suten'."

=== Cossack era ===
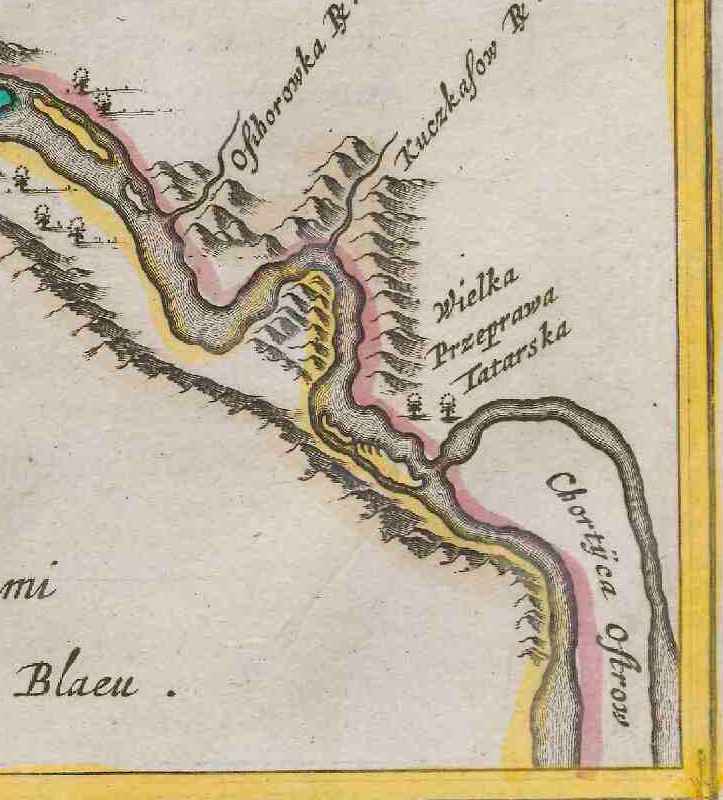
"Chortyca Ostrow" (Khortytsia Island) in the Atlas Maior (1664) of Joan Blaeu.

The earliest record about a stronghold later known as a sich refers to the Khortytsia Castle, located on the island of Little Khortytsia (Mala Khortytsia Island), established by the Volhynian prince Dmytro Vyshnevetsky ("Baida") in the 1550s. It is uncertain whether or not this island is to be identified with Kantserivsky Island, which was renamed "Baida Island" in the late 20th century after Vyshnevetsky. The Little Khortytsia Island is 20 times smaller than Khortytsia itself. It is also disputed whether this castle could be considered a "sich" as it would later become known as a few other locations downstream past the rapids (Zaporozhia area), where the Zaporizhian Sich was located.

=== Modern times ===
In 1789, Mennonites from the Baltic port city of Gdańsk (Danzig) were invited by the tsar to form settlements on the vast steppes of the Russian Empire. One of these settlements was located on the island of Khortytsia. They farmed on the rich island soil. Some of their profitable business was trade in lumber from the Khortytsia groves and woods. In 1916 the Mennonite colonists sold Khortytsia Island to the Alexandrovsk city council (see Chortitza Colony).

In 1965, Khortytsia Island was "proclaimed a historical and cultural reserve". The Dnieper Rapids state historical and cultural reserve was established in 1974; this included both Khortytsia Island, adjacent islands and rocks, and part of the right bank of the Dnieper. The total area of the reserve is 2,359 ha (5,830.1 acres; 9.1 sq mi). The reserve was given national status in 1993.

== National Reserve ==
The major part of the reserve (historic park) covers the Zaporizhian Cossack Museum that includes the Cossack horse show. The museum building is modern, nestling low in the landscape with dramatic views of the Dnieper Hydroelectric Station to the north. The museum was opened in October 1983, as the Museum of Zaporizhzhia History. The museum project was approved by the Ministry of Culture and Derzhbud of Ukraine in December 1970. The expo area of the museum was 1,600 m^{2} (17,000 sq ft), and portrayed the following themes: Khortytsia in ancient times, the history of the Zaporizhian Cossacks, and the history of Zaporizhzhia at times of construction of socialism.

There were four dioramas: "Battle of Sviatoslav at rapids" (author M. Oviechkin), "Uprising of the impoverished cossacks at Zaporizhian Sich in 1768" (M. Oviechkin), "Construction of Dnieper HES" (V. Trotsenko), "Night storm of Zaporizhzhia city in October 1943" (M. Oviechkin). Part of the museum became the Zaporizhzhian Oak located at the Upper Khortytsia. In 1992 the exposition of the museum was redesigned.

The museum contains exhibits dating from the Stone Age through the Scythian period (c. 750 – c. 250 BCE) down to the 20th century.

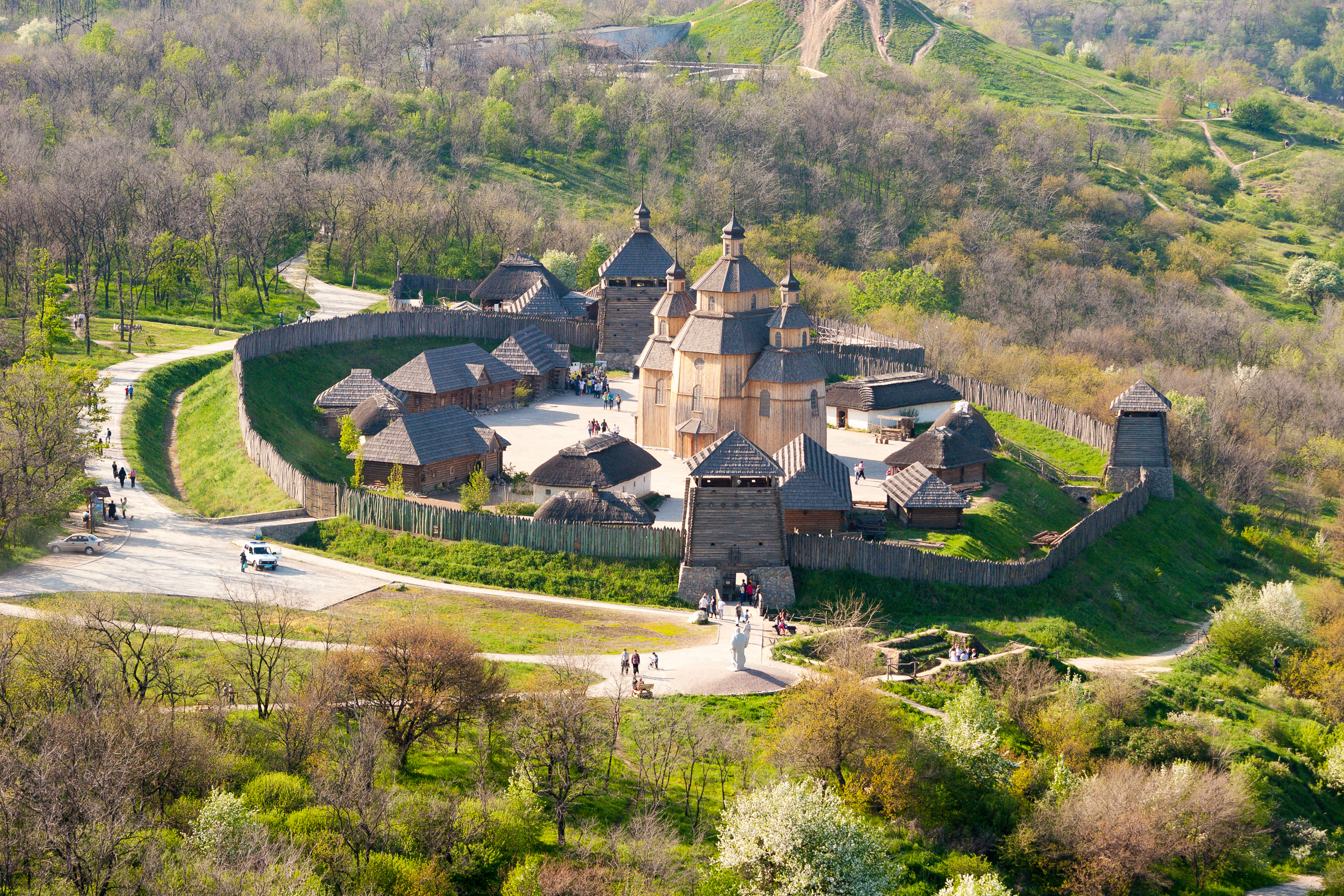
Museum of Zaporizhian Cossacks

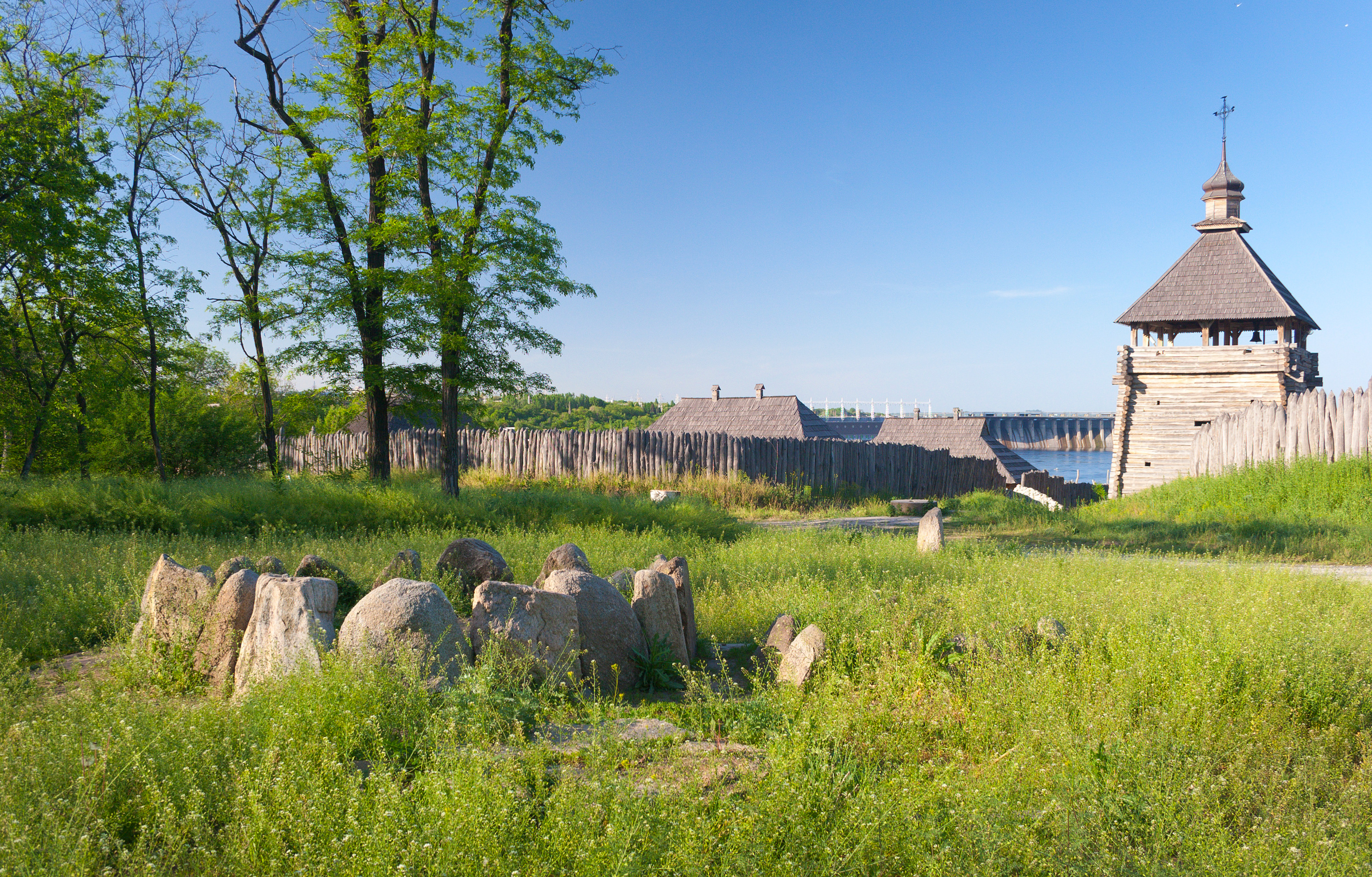
A Neolithic altar reconstructed at Khortytsia

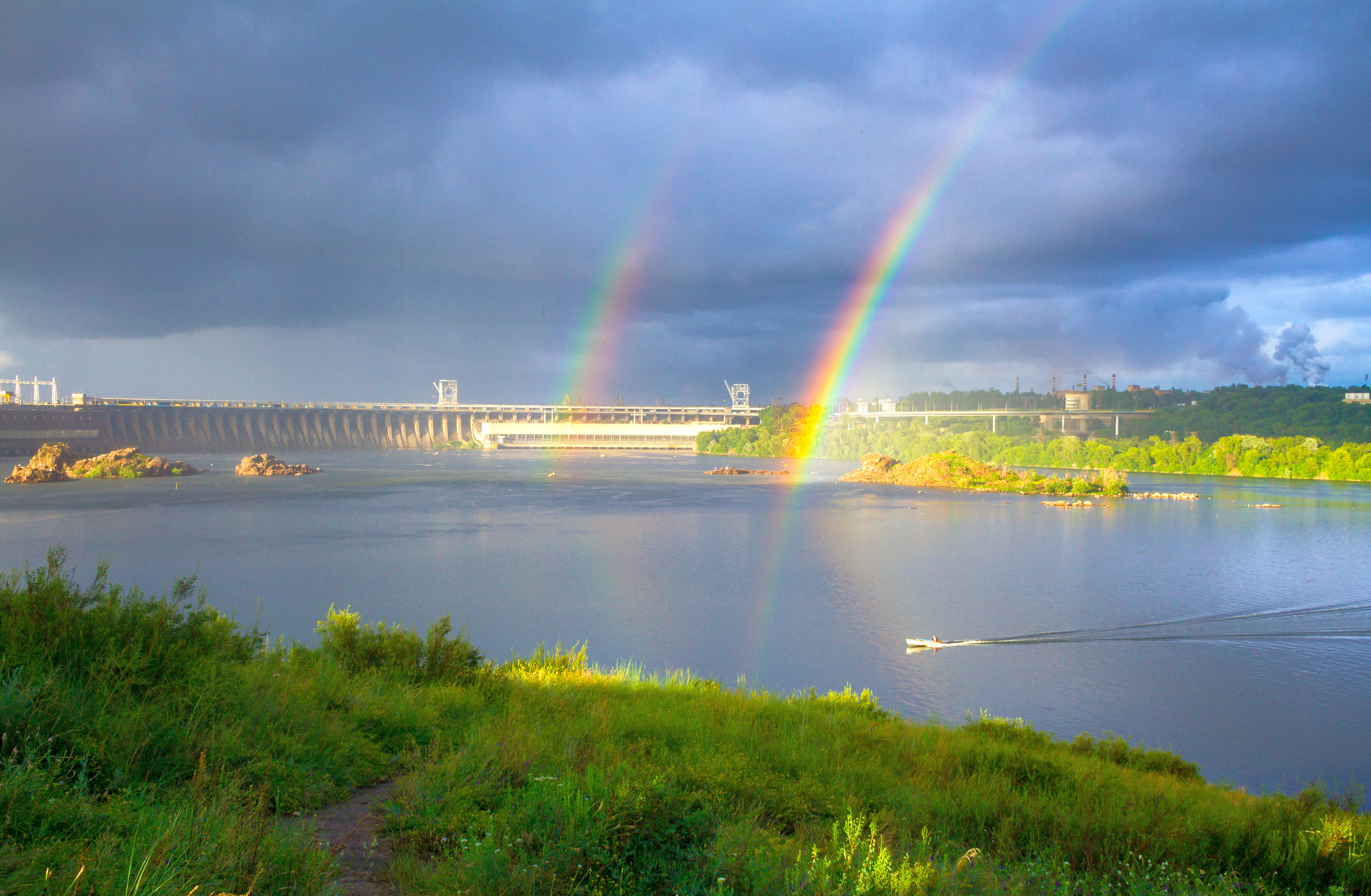
View of the Dnieper Hydroelectric Station from Khortytsia

== See also ==
- Khortytskyi District
- Russian Mennonite

== Bibliography ==
- Bürgers, Jana (2006). "Mythos und Museum. Kosakenmythos und Nationsbildung in der postsowjetischen Ukraine am Beispiel des Kosakengeschichtsmuseums auf der Insel Chortycja". In Pietrow-Ennker, Bianka (ed.). Kultur in der Geschichte Russlands (in German). Göttingen: Vandenhoeck & Ruprecht. ISBN 3-525-36293-5.
- Ganzer, Christian (2005). Sowjetisches Erbe und ukrainische Nation. Das Museum der Geschichte des Zaporoger Kosakentums auf der Insel Chortycja. Soviet and Post-Soviet Politics and Society (in German). Vol. 19. Preface by Frank Golczewski. Göttingen: Vandenhoeck & Ruprecht. ISBN 3-89821-504-0.
