= Cossacks =

Military estate of East Slavic people

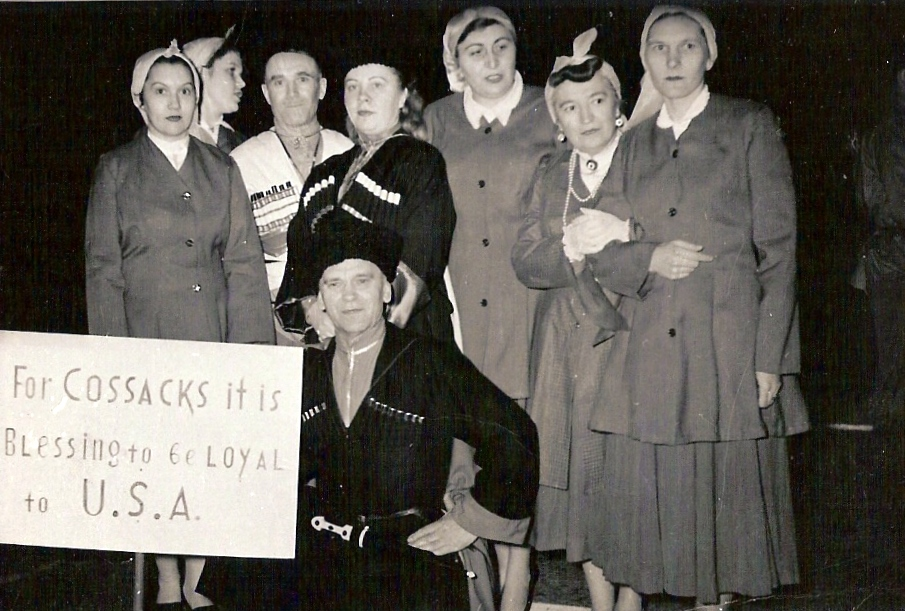
An American Cossack family in the 1950s

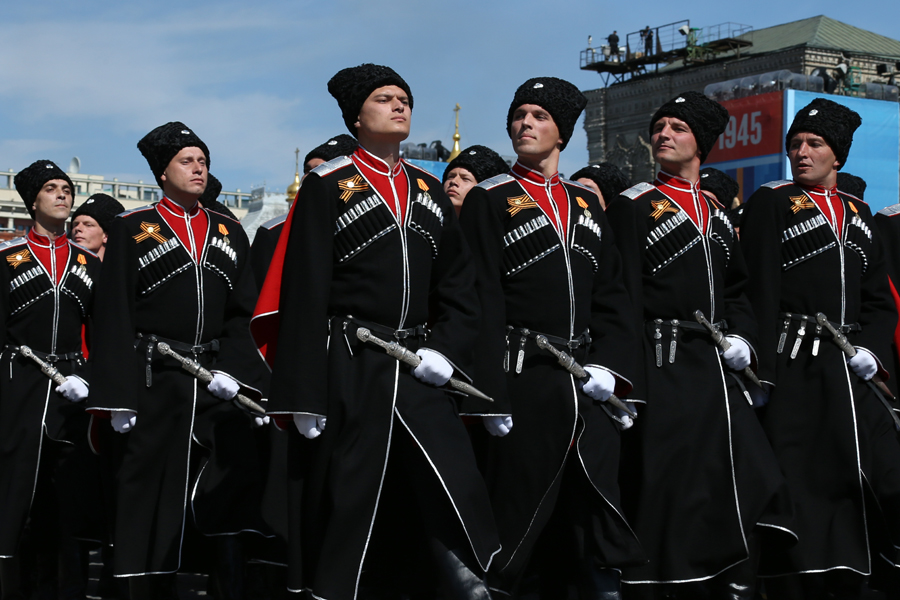
Cossacks marching in Red Square at the 2015 Victory Day Parade

The Cossacks (Note: Belarusian: казакi [kazaˈkʲi]; Czech: kozáci [ˈkozaːtsɪ]; Estonian: Kasakad [ˈkɑsɑkɑd]; Finnish: Kasakat [ˈkɑsɑkɑt]; Hungarian: kozákok [ˈkozaːkok]; Old East Slavic: коза́ки; Polish: Kozacy [kɔˈzatsɨ]; Russian: казаки́ or козаки́ [kəzɐˈkʲi]; Slovak: kozáci [ˈkɔzaːtsi]; Ukrainian: козаки́ [kozɐˈkɪ]) are a predominantly East Slavic, Eastern Orthodox Christian militant people, originating from the Pontic–Caspian steppe of eastern Ukraine and southern Russia. Cossacks played an important role in defending the southern borders of the Polish-Lithuanian Commonwealth and of the Russian Empire, countering the Crimean–Nogai raids, alongside economically developing steppe regions north of the Black Sea and around the Azov Sea. Historically, they were a semi-nomadic and semi-militarized people, who were allowed a great degree of self-governance in exchange for military service under the nominal suzerainty of various Eastern European states. Although numerous ethnic, linguistic and religious groups came together to form the Cossacks, the East Slavs predominated, with other groups gradually coalesced and Slavicized, thereby adopting East Slavic culture, East Slavic languages and Eastern Orthodox Christianity.

The rulers of the Polish–Lithuanian Commonwealth and Russian Empire endowed Cossacks with certain special privileges in return for the military duty to serve in the irregular troops: Zaporozhian Cossacks were mostly infantry soldiers, using war wagons, while Don Cossacks were primarily cavalry soldiers. The various Cossack groups organized along military lines, with large autonomous groups called hosts. Each host was responsible for protecting a territory consisting of affiliated villages called stanitsas.

They inhabited sparsely populated areas in the Dnieper, Don, Terek, and Ural river basins, and played an important role in the historical development of mounted horsemanship and cavalry battle tactics, and cultural development of both Ukraine and parts of Russia.

The Cossack way of life, centered strongly in their union and dependence on horses, persisted via both direct descendants and acquired ideals in other nations into the twentieth century, though the sweeping societal changes of the Russian Revolution disrupted Cossack society as much as any other part of Russia; many Cossacks migrated to other parts of Europe following the establishment of the Soviet Union, while others remained and assimilated into the Communist state. Cohesive Cossack-based cavalry units were organized and many fought for both Nazi Germany and the Soviet Union during World War II.

After World War II, the Soviet Union disbanded the Cossack units within the Soviet Army, leading to the suppression of many Cossack traditions during the rule of Joseph Stalin and his successors. However, during the Perestroika era in the late 1980s, descendants of Cossacks began to revive their horse-centered way of life and historic traditions. In 1988, the Soviet Union enacted a law permitting the re-establishment of former Cossack hosts and the formation of new ones. Throughout the 1990s, numerous regional authorities consented to delegate certain local administrative and policing responsibilities to these reconstituted Cossack hosts.

Between 3.5 and 5 million people associate themselves with the Cossack cultural identity across the world, even though the majority have little to no connection to the original Cossack people because cultural ideals and legacy changed greatly with time. Cossack organizations operate in Russia, Ukraine, Belarus, Kazakhstan, Canada, and the United States.

== Etymology ==
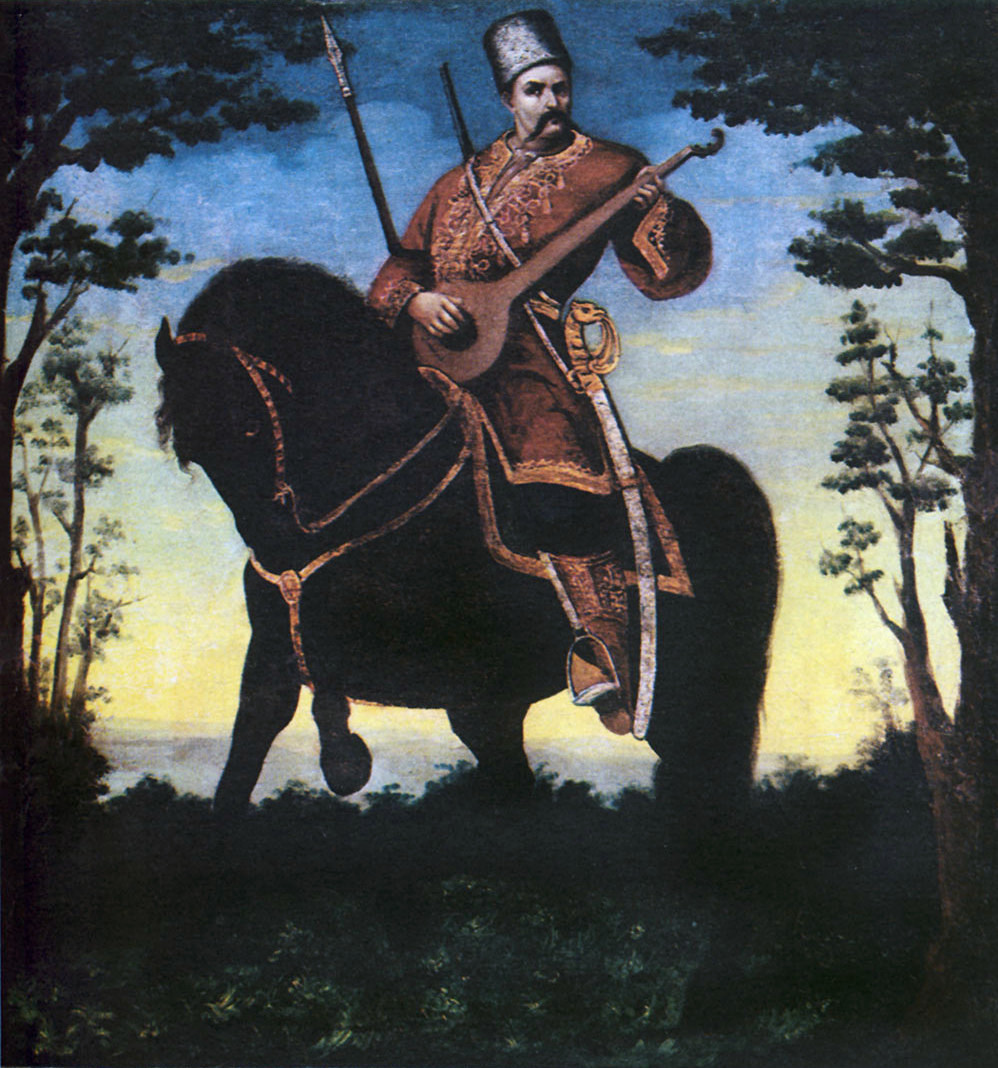
Cossack bandurist, 1890

Max Vasmer's etymological dictionary traces the name to the Tatar Turkic word kazak, kozak, in which cosac meant 'free man' but also 'conqueror'. The ethnonym Kazakh is from the same Turkic root.

In written sources, the name is first attested in the Codex Cumanicus from the 13th century.

Larysa Pritsak (2024) grouped the earliest references of the word Cossack(s) into three groups:

- Late 14th – early 15th century: Sparse references to individual Cossacks.
- Late 15th – early 16th century: Cossacks specialising in military professions, mostly serving as mercenary border guards of the Commonwealth, Muscovy, Crimea or the Ottoman Empire, and living in settlements known as a sich.
- Last quarter of the 16th century – first half of the 17th century: Formation of the Cossacks as a separate social status with the establishment of the Cossack Registry and the recognition of the Zaporozhian Host.

In English, Cossack is first attested in 1590.

== History ==
=== Early history ===
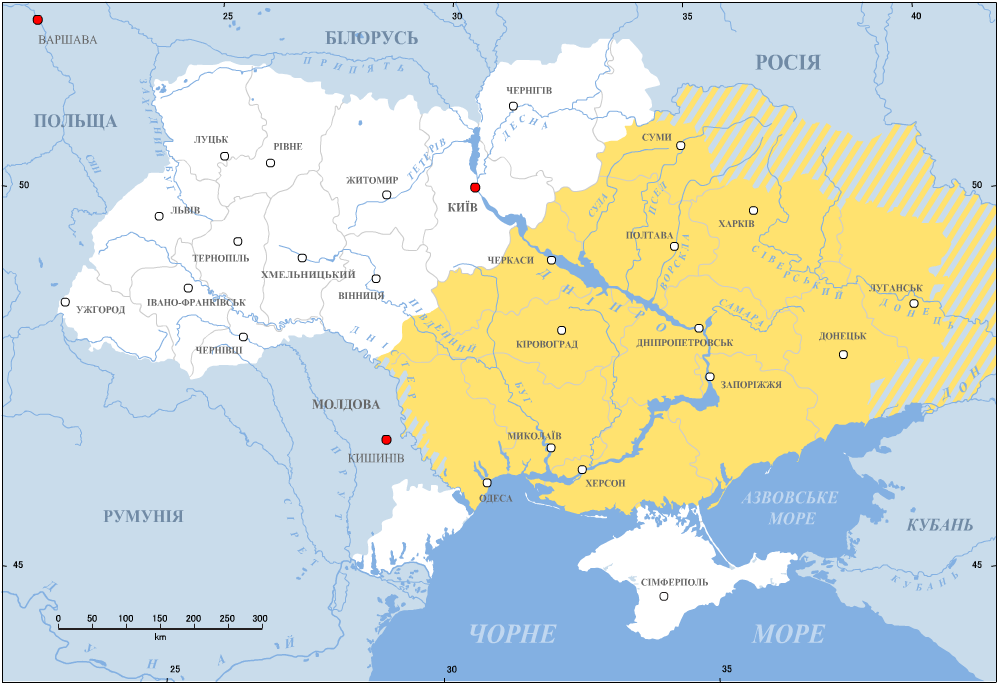
Map of the Wild Fields in the 17th century (superimposed on modern borders)

The origins of the Cossacks are disputed. According to scientific studies, the Y-chromosomal genetic makeup of Zaporozhian, Don, and Kuban Cossacks forms the southern fragment of the East Slavic population, with minimal or no Caucasian or Asian component in their paternal gene pool. However, the term "Cossack" referred to independent horse-riding communities by the Tatars (qazaq or "free men") who inhabited the Pontic–Caspian steppe, north of the Black Sea near the Dnieper River. By the end of the 15th century, the term was also applied to Slavic peasants who had fled to the devastated regions along the lower Dnieper and Don Rivers, where they established their self-governing, cavalry-based communities. Until at least the 1630s, these Cossack groups remained ethnically and religiously homogenous. There were several major Cossack hosts in the 16th century: near the Dnieper, Don, Volga, and Ural Rivers; the Greben Cossacks in Caucasia; and the Zaporozhian Cossacks, mainly west of the Dnieper.

It is unclear when people other than the Brodnici and Berladnici (which had a Romanian origin with large Slavic influences) began to settle in the lower reaches of major rivers such as the Don and the Dnieper after the demise of the Khazars. Their arrival was theorized to have been around the 13th century when the Mongols broke the power of the Cumans, who had assimilated the previous population in that region. It is known that immigrant settlers inherited a lifestyle that long pre-dated their presence, including from that of the Cumans and the Circassian Kassaks. In contrast, Slavic settlements in southern Ukraine started to appear relatively early during Cuman rule, with the earliest, such as Oleshia, dating back to the 11th century.

Early "Proto-Cossack" groups are generally reported to have come into existence within what is now Ukraine prior to the 13th century as the influence of Cumans grew weaker, although some have ascribed their origins to as early as the mid-8th century. Some historians suggest that the Cossack people were descended from East Slavs, Oghuz Turks, Tatars, Circassians and others who settled or passed through the vast regions. There are archeological indications, according to Turkologists, that Cossacks are descendants of the native Cumans of Ukraine, who had lived there long before the Mongol invasion. Other theories expand upon that assertion to suggest that the first Cossacks were of Turkic origin. For example, according to Serhii Plokhy, the first Cossacks were of Turkic rather than Slavic stock. Christoph Baumer states that Cossack predecessors from the thirteenth century onward were mainly of Turkic stock, but from the sixteenth century the Cossacks were increasingly joined by Slavs such as Russians and Poles, Baltic Lithuanians and people from today's Ukraine, thus becoming a Slav-Tatar ethnic hybrid. The theory is also reflected in the Constitution of Pylyp Orlyk of 1710 and the Hrabianka Chronicle, which claims Khazar origins for the Cossacks. The Khazar origin myth became popular during the rule of Ivan Mazepa, a reaction against the Polish myth of Sarmatism. Hypothesis of the non-Slavic origin of the Zaporozhian, Don and Kuban Cossacks is undermined by the minimal levels of Circassian and Asian components in the Y-chromosomal gene pool of these groups; this differs with the Terek Cossacks, who have historically been aligned with North Circassian groups, likely as a result of the assimilation of such populations into the Terek Host.

As the grand duchies of Moscow and Lithuania grew in power, new political entities appeared in the region. These included Moldavia and the Crimean Khanate. In 1261, Slavic people living in the area between the Dniester and the Volga were mentioned in Ruthenian chronicles.

As early as the 15th century, a few individuals ventured into the Wild Fields, the southern frontier regions of Ukraine separating Poland-Lithuania from the Crimean Khanate. These were short-term expeditions, to acquire the information regarding the naturally rich and fertile region teeming with horses, cattle, wild animals, and fish. The Cossack lifestyle was based on subsistence agriculture, nomadic hunting, then returning home in the winter. They settled tightly knit communities and practiced advanced horse training methods, a type of communal living that came to be known as the Cossack way of life. Crimean–Nogai slave raids in Eastern Europe caused terror, considerable devastation, and depopulation to those thriving communities. The Crimean Tatar raids played a role in the evolution of the war like attitudes of the Cossacks and their subsequent reprisals.

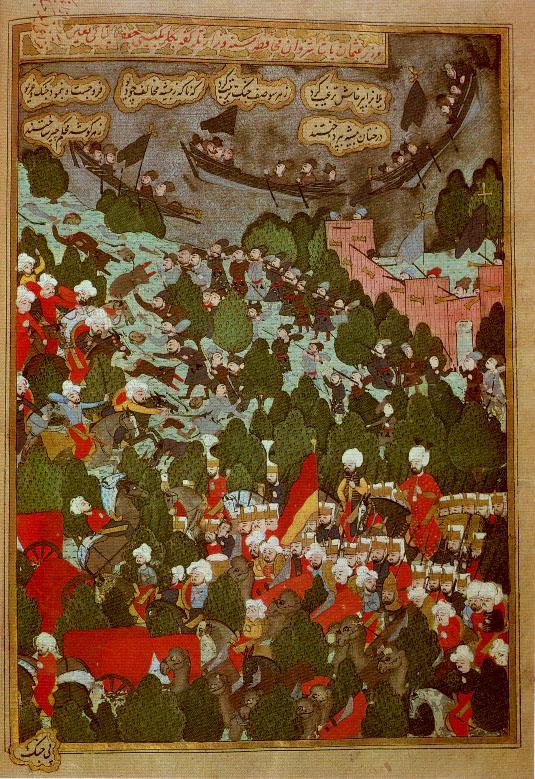
Ottoman Turks in battle against the Cossacks, 1592

In the 15th century, Cossack society was described as a federation of independent communities, which often formed local cavalry units and were entirely independent from neighboring states such as Poland, the Grand Duchy of Moscow, and the Crimean Khanate. There are confusing historical reports, according to Mykhailo Hrushevsky, that "the first mention of Cossacks dates back to the 14th century", although that seems indicative of people who were either Turkic or of undefined origin. Hrushevsky states that a deeper intuitive study of the evolution of the Cossacks indicates they may have descended from the long-forgotten Antes, or from groups from the Berlad territory of the Brodnici in present-day Romania, then a part of the Grand Duchy of Halych. There, the Cossacks may have served as self-defence formations, organized to defend against raids conducted by aggressive far-ranging tribes.

The first international mention of Cossacks was in 1492, when Crimean Khan Meñli I Giray complained accusingly to Grand Duke of Lithuania Alexander Jagiellon that the Grand Duke's Cossack subjects from Kiev and Cherkasy had pillaged a Crimean Tatar ship. The duke ordered his "Ukrainian" (meaning borderland) officials to investigate, execute the guilty, and give their belongings to the Khan. Sometime in the 16th century, there appeared an old Ukrainian Ballad of Cossack Holota, about a Cossack near Kiliya.

In the 16th century Cossack societies evolved into two independent territorial organizations, as well as other smaller, still-detached groups:

- The Cossacks of Zaporizhzhia, centered on the lower bends of the Dnieper, in the territory of modern Ukraine, with the fortified capital of Zaporozhian Sich. They were given significant autonomous privileges, operating as an autonomous state (the Zaporozhian Host) within the Polish-Lithuanian Commonwealth, by a treaty with Poland in 1649.
- The Don Cossack State, on the River Don. Its capital was initially Razdory, then it was moved to Cherkassk, and later to Novocherkassk.

There are also references to less well-known Tatar Cossacks, including the Nağaybäklär and Meshchera-speaking Volga Finns, of whom Sary Azman was the first Don ataman. It is a strange, conflicting report that these groups were assimilated by the Don Cossacks since the Turks were Muslim, the Cossack Orthodox Christian. It could be the assimilation took place in the event of raiding opposing tribes and the taking of slaves. Some are reported to have had their own irregular Bashkir and Meshchera Host up to the end of the 19th century. The Kalmyk and Buryat Cossacks also deserve mention.

=== Later history ===
The Zaporizhian Sich became a vassal polity of the Polish–Lithuanian Commonwealth during feudal times. Under increasing pressure from the Polish–Lithuanian Commonwealth, in the mid-17th century the Sich declared an independent Cossack Hetmanate. The Hetmanate was initiated by a rebellion under Bohdan Khmelnytsky against Polish and Catholic domination, known as the Khmelnytsky Uprising. Afterwards, the Treaty of Pereyaslav (1654) brought most of the Cossack state under Russian rule. The Sich, with its lands, became an autonomous region under the Russian protectorate.

The Don Cossack Army, an autonomous military state formation of the Don Cossacks under the citizenship of the Moscow State in the Don region in 1671–1786, began a systematic conquest and colonization of lands to secure the borders on the Volga, the whole of Siberia (see Yermak Timofeyevich), and the Yaik (Ural) and Terek Rivers. Cossack communities had developed along the latter two rivers well before the arrival of the Don Cossacks.

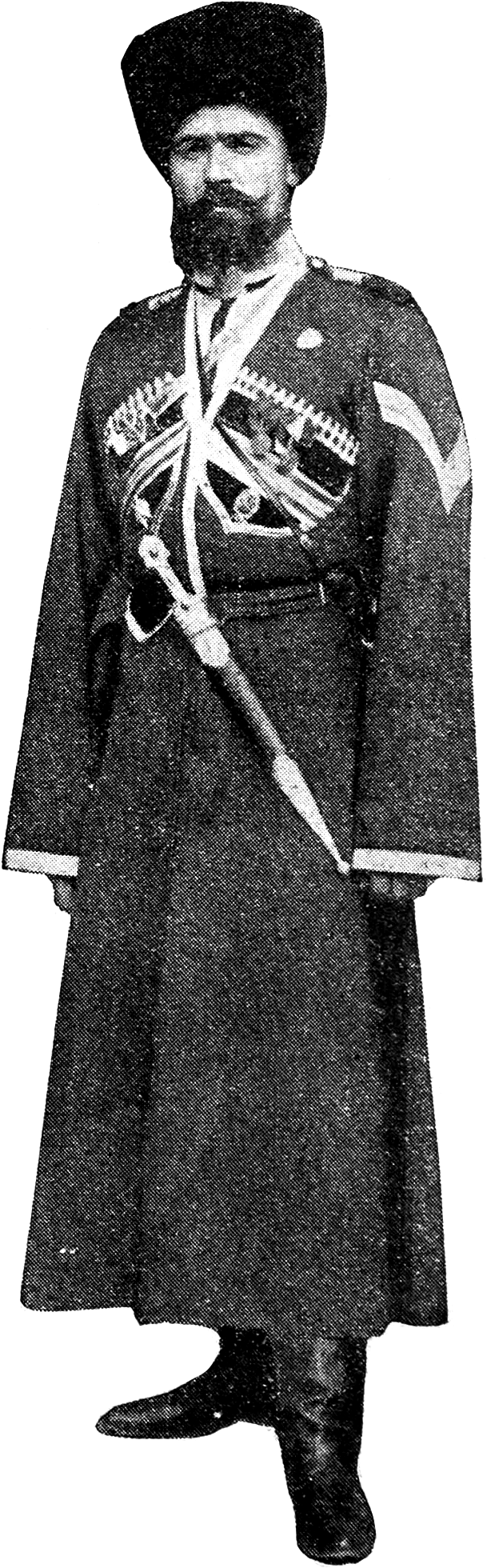
Portrait of a Terek or Kuban Cossack during World War I (The Cossack - The man the Prussian fears - The War Illustrated, 1914)

By the 18th century, Cossack hosts in the Russian Empire occupied effective buffer zones on its borders. The expansionist ambitions of the Empire relied on ensuring Cossack loyalty, which caused tension given their traditional exercise of freedom, democracy, self-rule, and independence. Cossacks such as Stenka Razin, Kondraty Bulavin, Ivan Mazepa and Yemelyan Pugachev led major anti-imperial wars and revolutions in the Empire in order to abolish slavery and harsh bureaucracy, and to maintain independence. The Empire responded with executions and tortures, the destruction of the western part of the Don Cossack Host during the Bulavin Rebellion in 1707–1708, the destruction of Baturyn after Mazepa's rebellion in 1708, (Note: See, for example, Executions of Cossacks in Lebedin.) and the formal dissolution of the Lower Dnieper Zaporozhian Host after Pugachev's Rebellion in 1775. After the Pugachev rebellion, the Empire renamed the Yaik Host, its capital, the Yaik Cossacks, and the Cossack town of Zimoveyskaya in the Don region to try to encourage the Cossacks to forget the men and their uprisings. It also formally dissolved the Lower Dnieper Zaporozhian Cossack Host, and destroyed their fortress on the Dnieper (the Sich itself). This may in part have been due to the participation of some Zaporozhian and other Ukrainian exiles in Pugachev's rebellion. During his campaign, Pugachev issued manifestos calling for restoration of all borders and freedoms of both the Polish–Lithuanian Commonwealth and the Lower Dnieper (Nyzovyi in Ukrainian) Cossack Host under the joint protectorate of Russia and the Commonwealth.

By the end of the 18th century, Cossack nations had been transformed into a special military estate (sosloviye), "a military class". The Malorussian Cossacks (the former Registered Cossacks also known as "Town Zaporozhian Host") were excluded from this transformation, but were promoted to membership of various civil estates or classes (often Russian nobility), including the newly created civil estate of Cossacks.

Under a semi-feudal system retained until the end of the Russian Empire, Cossack families received grants of land which they retained free of taxation, provided that commitments to perform military service were met. Typically a single father or son from each registered family would serve several years full-time with his Host before becoming a reservist liable for recall only in the event of emergency or general mobilisation. When joining his regiment a Cossack was required to bring his own horse, uniform clothing, and basic weaponry (sabres and lances) although the larger and more affluent Hosts might assist in sourcing these essentials. The Russian central government provided only firearms plus food and accommodation. Lacking horses, the poor served in the Cossack infantry and artillery. In the navy alone, Cossacks served with other peoples as the Russian navy had no Cossack ships and units. Cossack service was considered rigorous.

Cossack forces played an important role in Russia's wars of the 18th–20th centuries, including the Great Northern War, the Seven Years' War, the Crimean War, the Napoleonic Wars, the Caucasus War, many Russo-Persian Wars, many Russo-Turkish Wars, and the First World War. In the late 19th and early 20th centuries, the Tsarist regime used Cossacks extensively to perform police service. Cossacks also served as border guards on national and internal ethnic borders, as had been the case in the Caucasus War.

During the Russian Civil War, Don and Kuban Cossacks were the first people to declare open war against the Bolsheviks. In 1918, Russian Cossacks declared their complete independence, creating two independent states, the Don Republic and the Kuban People's Republic, and the revived Hetmanate emerged in Ukraine. Cossack troops formed the effective core of the anti-Bolshevik White Army, and Cossack republics became centers for the anti-Bolshevik White movement. With the victory of the Red Army, Cossack lands were subjected to decossackization and the Holodomor famine. As a result, during the Second World War, their loyalties were divided and both sides had Cossacks fighting in their ranks.

Following the dissolution of the Soviet Union, the Cossacks made a systematic return to Russia. Many took an active part in post-Soviet conflicts. In the 2002 Russian Census, 140,028 people reported their ethnicity as Cossack. There are Cossack organizations in Russia, Kazakhstan, Ukraine, Belarus, and the United States.

== Ukrainian Cossacks ==
=== Zaporozhian Cossacks ===
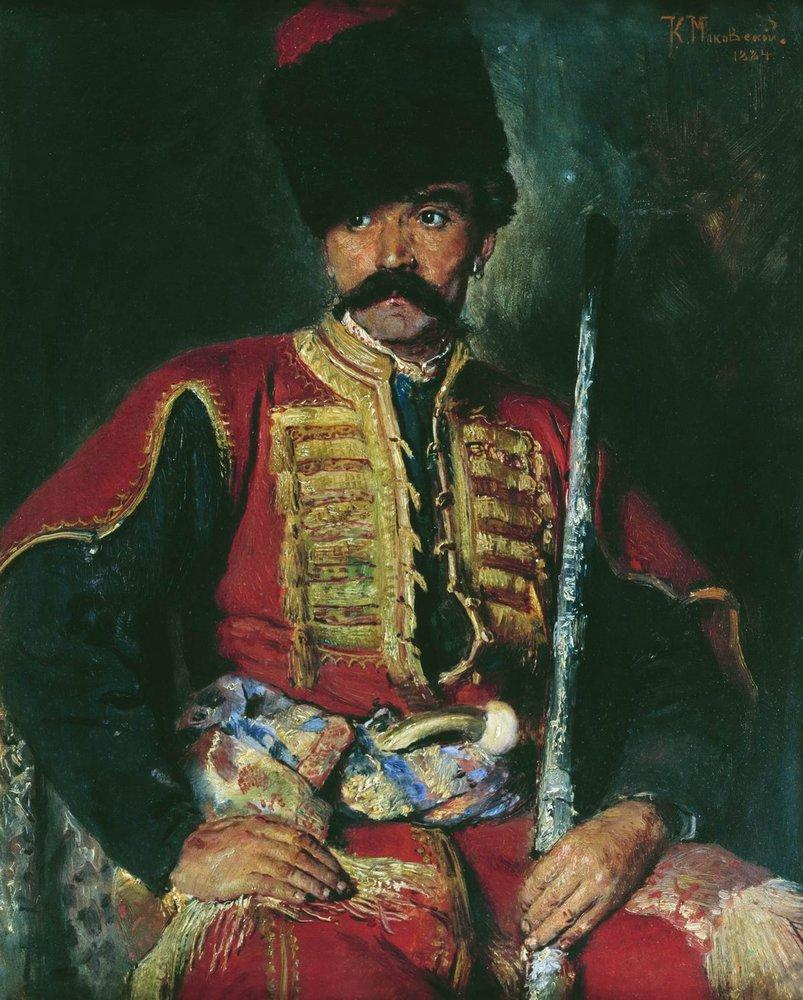
Zaporozhian Cossack by Konstantin Makovsky, 1884

The Zaporozhian Cossacks lived on the Pontic–Caspian steppe below the Dnieper Rapids (Ukrainian: za porohamy), also known as the Wild Fields. The group became well known, and its numbers increased greatly between the 15th and 17th centuries. The Zaporozhian Cossacks played an important role in European geopolitics, participating in a series of conflicts and alliances with the Polish–Lithuanian Commonwealth, Russia, and the Ottoman Empire. The Zaporozhians gained a reputation for their raids against the Ottoman Empire and its vassals, although they also sometimes plundered other neighbors. Their actions increased tension along the southern border of the Polish–Lithuanian Commonwealth. Low-level warfare took place in those territories for most of the period of the Commonwealth (1569–1795).

==== Emergence ====
Prior to the formation of the Zaporozhian Sich, Cossacks had usually been organized by Ruthenian boyars, or princes of the nobility, especially various Lithuanian starostas. Merchants, peasants, and runaways from the Polish–Lithuanian Commonwealth, Muscovy, and Moldavia also joined the Cossacks.

It has been argued that the first sich prototype was formed by the starosta of Cherkasy and Kaniv, Dmytro Vyshnevetsky, who built Khortytsia Castle on the island of "Little Khortytsia" on the banks of the Lower Dnieper in the 1550s. The Zaporozhian Host adopted a lifestyle that combined the ancient Cossack order and habits with those of the Knights Hospitaller.

The Cossack structure arose, in part, in response to the struggle against Tatar raids. Socio-economic developments in the Polish-Lithuanian Commonwealth were another important factor in the growth of the Ukrainian Cossacks. During the 16th century, serfdom was imposed because of the favorable conditions for grain sales in Western Europe. This subsequently decreased the locals' land allotments and freedom of movement. In addition, the Polish-Lithuanian Commonwealth government attempted to impose Catholicism, and to Polonize the local Ukrainian population. The basic form of resistance and opposition by the locals and burghers was flight and settlement in the sparsely populated steppe.

==== Relations with surrounding states ====
The major powers tried to exploit Cossack military power for their own purposes. In the 16th century, with the area of the Polish-Lithuanian Commonwealth extending south, the Zaporozhian Cossacks were mostly, if tentatively, regarded by the Commonwealth as their subjects. Foreign and internal pressure on the Polish-Lithuanian Commonwealth led to the government making concessions to the Zaporozhian Cossacks. King Stephen Báthory granted them certain rights and freedoms in 1578, and they gradually began to create their foreign policy. They did so independently of the government, and often against its interests, as for example with their role in Moldavian affairs, and with the signing of a treaty with Emperor Rudolf II in the 1590s. Registered Cossacks formed a part of the Commonwealth army until 1699.

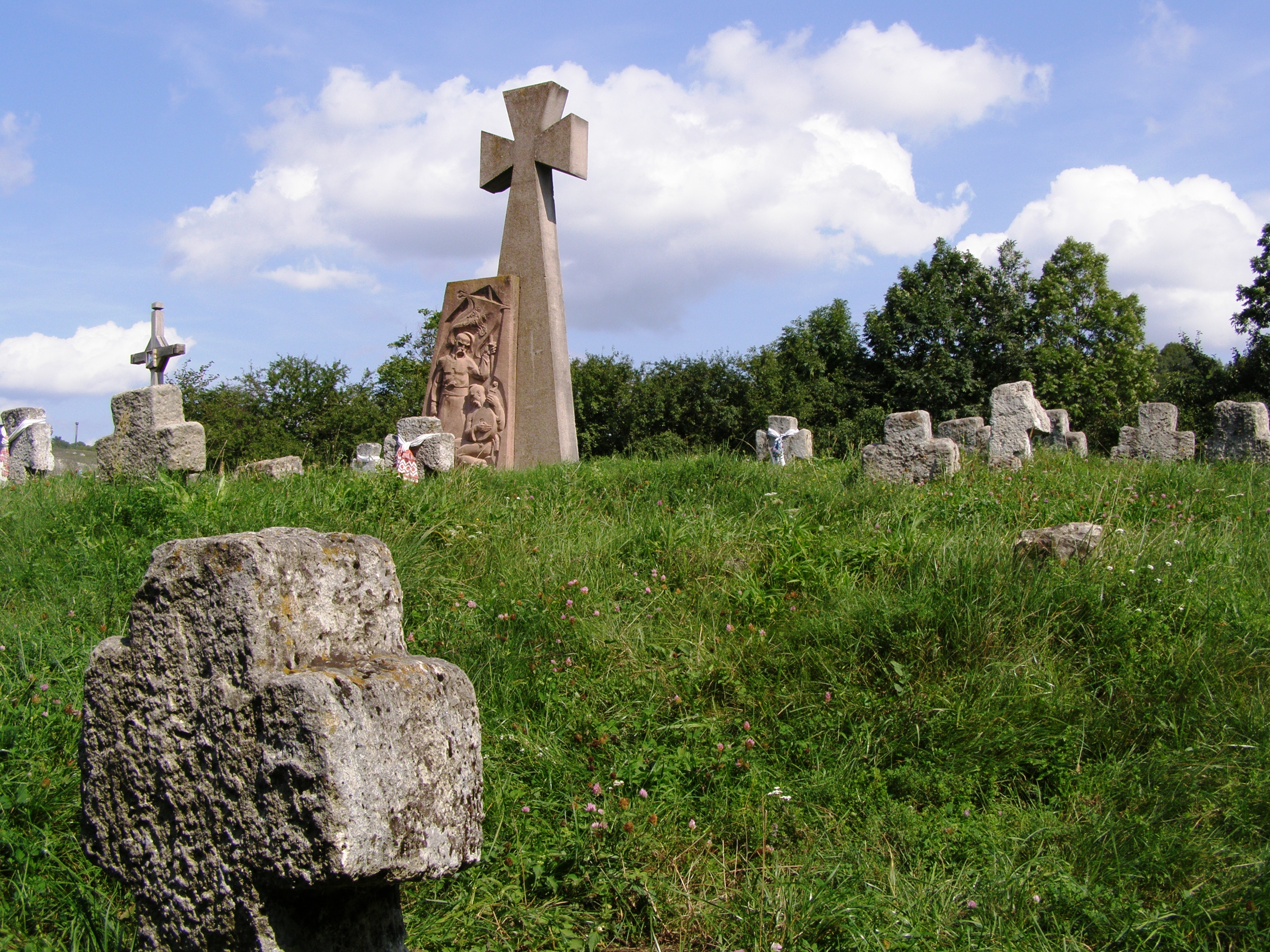
Cossack crosses on a cemetery near Kremenets, Ukraine

Around the end of the 16th century, increasing Cossack aggression strained relations between the Commonwealth and the Ottoman Empire. Cossacks had begun raiding Ottoman territories during the second part of the 16th century. The Polish government could not control them, but was held responsible as the men were nominally its subjects. In retaliation, Tatars living under Ottoman rule launched raids into the Commonwealth, mostly in the southeast territories. Cossack pirates responded by raiding wealthy trading port-cities in the heart of the Ottoman Empire, as these were just two days away by boat from the mouth of the Dnieper river. In 1615 and 1625, Cossacks razed suburbs of Constantinople, forcing the Ottoman Sultan to flee his palace. In 1637, the Zaporozhian Cossacks, joined by the Don Cossacks, captured the strategic Ottoman fortress of Azov, which guarded the Don.

The Zaporizhian Cossacks became particularly strong in the first quarter of the 17th century under the leadership of hetman Petro Konashevych-Sahaidachny, who launched successful campaigns against the Tatars and Turks. Tsar Boris Godunov had incurred the hatred of Ukrainian Cossacks by ordering the Don Cossacks to drive away from the Don all the Ukrainian Cossacks fleeing the failed uprisings of the 1590s. This contributed to the Ukrainian Cossacks' willingness to fight against him. In 1604, 2,000 Zaporizhian Cossacks fought on the side of the Polish-Lithuanian Commonwealth and their proposal for the Tsar (Dmitri I), against the Muscovite army. By September 1604, Dmitri I had gathered a force of 2,500 men, of whom 1,400 were Cossacks. Two thirds of these "cossacks", however, were in fact Ukrainian civilians, only 500 being professional Ukrainian Cossacks. On July 4, 1610, 4,000 Ukrainian Cossacks fought in the Battle of Klushino, on the side of the Polish-Lithuanian Commonwealth. They helped to defeat a combined Muscovite-Swedish army and facilitate the occupation of Moscow from 1610 to 1611, riding into Moscow with Stanisław Żółkiewski.

The final attempt by King Sigismund and Wladyslav to seize the throne of Muscovy was launched on April 6, 1617. Although Wladyslav was the nominal leader, it was Jan Karol Chodkiewicz who commanded the Commonwealth forces. By October, the towns of Dorogobuzh and Vyazma had surrendered. But a defeat, when the counterattack on Moscow by Chodkiewicz failed between Vyasma and Mozhaysk, prompted the Polish-Lithuanian army to retreat. In 1618, Petro Konashevych-Sahaidachny continued his campaign against the Tsardom of Russia on behalf of the Cossacks and the Polish-Lithuanian Commonwealth. Numerous Russian towns were sacked, including Livny and Yelets. In September 1618, with Chodkiewicz, Konashevych-Sahaidachny laid siege to Moscow, but peace was secured.

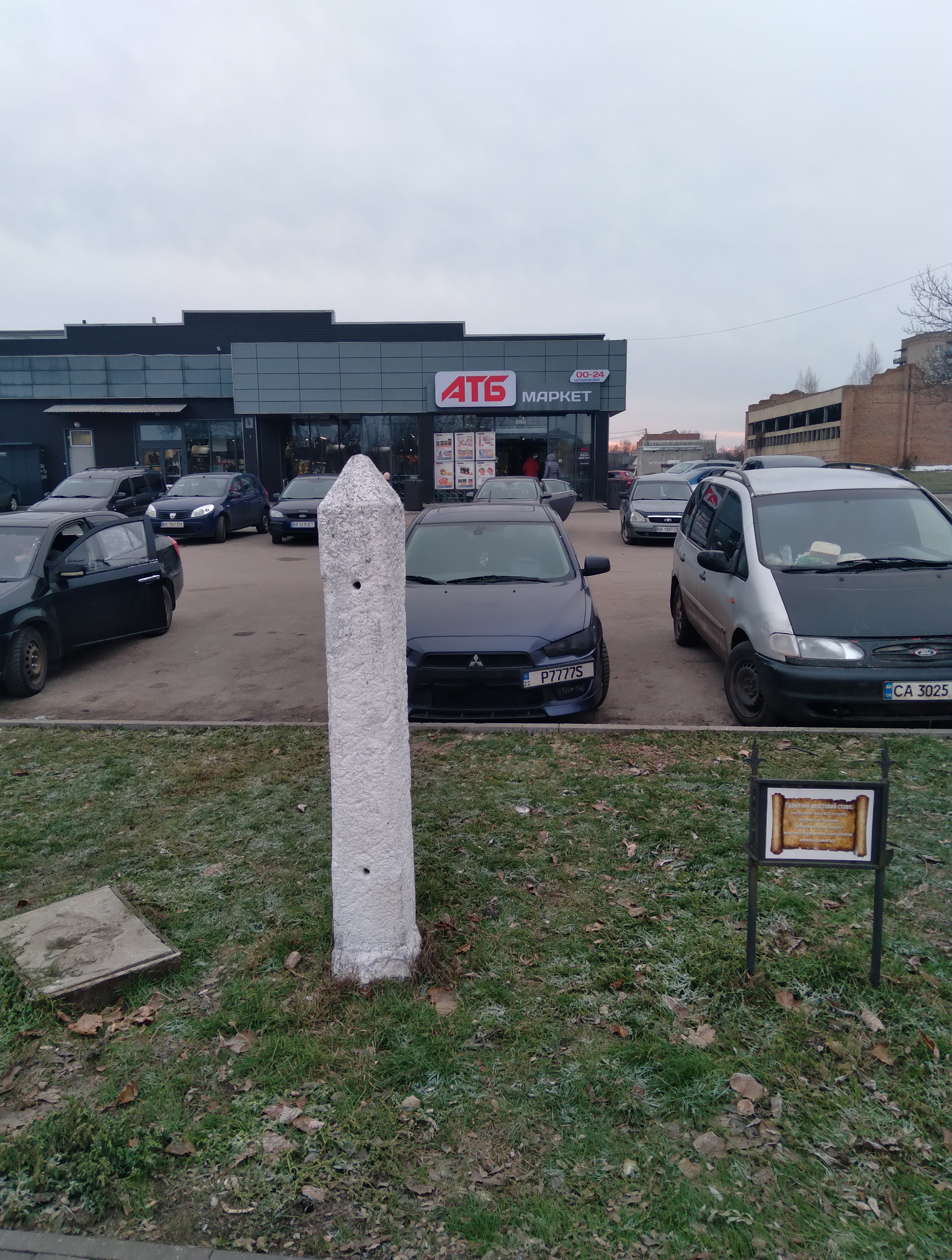
One of the unique granite columns with which the Cossacks marked their territory

Consecutive treaties between the Ottoman Empire and the Polish–Lithuanian Commonwealth called for the governments to keep the Cossacks and Tatars in check, but neither enforced the treaties strongly. The Polish forced the Cossacks to burn their boats and stop raiding by sea, but the activity did not cease entirely. During this time, the Habsburg monarchy sometimes covertly hired Cossack raiders against the Ottomans, to ease pressure on their own borders. Many Cossacks and Tatars developed longstanding enmity due to the losses of their raids. The ensuing chaos and cycles of retaliation often turned the entire southeastern Polish–Lithuanian Commonwealth border into a low-intensity war zone. It catalyzed escalation of Commonwealth–Ottoman warfare, from the Moldavian Magnate Wars (1593–1617) to the Battle of Cecora (1620), and campaigns in the Polish–Ottoman War of 1633–1634.

==== Conflict with Poland ====
Cossack numbers increased when the warriors were joined by peasants escaping serfdom in Russia and dependence in the Commonwealth. Attempts by the szlachta to turn the Zaporozhian Cossacks into peasants eroded the formerly strong Cossack loyalty towards the Commonwealth. The government constantly rebuffed Cossack ambitions for recognition as equal to the szlachta. Plans for transforming the Polish–Lithuanian two-nation Commonwealth into a Polish–Lithuanian–Ruthenian Commonwealth made little progress, due to the unpopularity among the Ruthenian szlachta of the idea of Ruthenian Cossacks being equal to them and their elite becoming members of the szlachta. The Cossacks' strong historic allegiance to the Eastern Orthodox Church also put them at odds with officials of the Roman Catholic-dominated Commonwealth. Tensions increased when Commonwealth policies turned from relative tolerance to suppression of the Eastern Orthodox Church after the Union of Brest. The Cossacks became strongly anti-Roman Catholic, an attitude that became synonymous with anti-Polish.

After the Ottoman-Polish and Polish-Muscovite warfare ceased, the official Cossack register was again reduced. The registered Cossacks (reiestrovi kozaky) were isolated from those who were excluded from the register, and from the Zaporizhian Host. This, together with intensified socioeconomic and national-religious oppression of the other classes in Ukrainian society, led to many Cossack uprisings in the 1630s. The nobility, which had obtained legal ownership of vast expanses of land on the Dnipro from the Polish kings, attempted to impose feudal dependency on the local population. Landowners utilized the locals in war, by raising the Cossack registry in times of hostility, and then radically decreasing it and forcing the Cossacks back into serfdom in times of peace. This institutionalized method of control bred discontent among the Cossacks. By the end of the 16th century, they began to revolt, in the uprisings of Kryshtof Kosynsky (1591–1593), Severyn Nalyvaiko (1594–1596), Hryhorii Loboda (1596), Marko Zhmailo (1625), Taras Fedorovych (1630), Ivan Sulyma (1635), Pavlo Pavliuk and Dmytro Hunia (1637), and Yakiv Ostrianyn and Karpo Skydan (1638). All were brutally suppressed and ended by the Polish government. Cossack rebellions eventually culminated in the Khmelnytsky Uprising, led by the hetman of the Zaporizhian Sich, Bohdan Khmelnytsky.

==== Under Russian rule ====
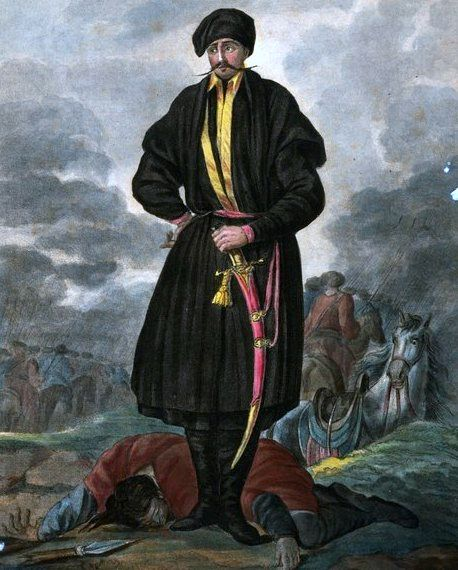
An officer of the Zaporozhian Cossacks in 1720

The Zaporozhian Sich had its own authorities, its own "Lower" Zaporozhian Host, and its own land. In 1775, the Lower Dnieper Zaporozhian Host was destroyed. Later, its high-ranking Cossack leaders were exiled to Siberia, its last chief, Petro Kalnyshevsky, becoming a prisoner of the Solovetsky Islands. Some Cossacks moved to the Danube Delta region, where they established a new sich under Ottoman rule. To prevent further defection of Cossacks, the Russian government restored the special Cossack status of the majority of Zaporozhian Cossacks. This allowed them to unite in the Host of Loyal Zaporozhians, and later to reorganize into other hosts, of which the Black Sea Host was most important. Because of land scarcity resulting from the distribution of Zaporozhian Sich lands among landlords, they eventually moved on to the Kuban region.

The majority of Danubian Sich Cossacks moved first to the Azov region in 1828, and later joined other former Zaporozhian Cossacks in the Kuban region. Groups were generally identified by faith rather than language in that period, and most descendants of Zaporozhian Cossacks in the Kuban region are bilingual, speaking both Russian and Balachka, the local Kuban dialect of central Ukrainian. Their folklore is largely Ukrainian. (Note: This is also true of the Don Cossacks of the Lower Don, where the local dialect is related to Ukrainian. Many Ukrainian peasants joined the Terek Cossacks in the 1820s–30s, influencing local dialects. But among the Terek Cossacks, the Grebensky (Row) Cossacks, who had deep Adyghe roots through intermarriage, still speak an old northern Russian Viatka dialect which likely has connections to the old dialects of the White Sea shores. The Middle Don dialects are related to northern Russian dialects, the Belarusian language, and the Volyn dialects of Ukrainian. The Volyn dialects are close to Belarusian dialects, only the Upper Don dialects being from southern Russia.) The predominant view of ethnologists and historians is that its origins lie in the common culture dating back to the Black Sea Cossacks.

=== Cossack Hetmanate ===
==== Formation of the Cossack class in the Hetmanate ====
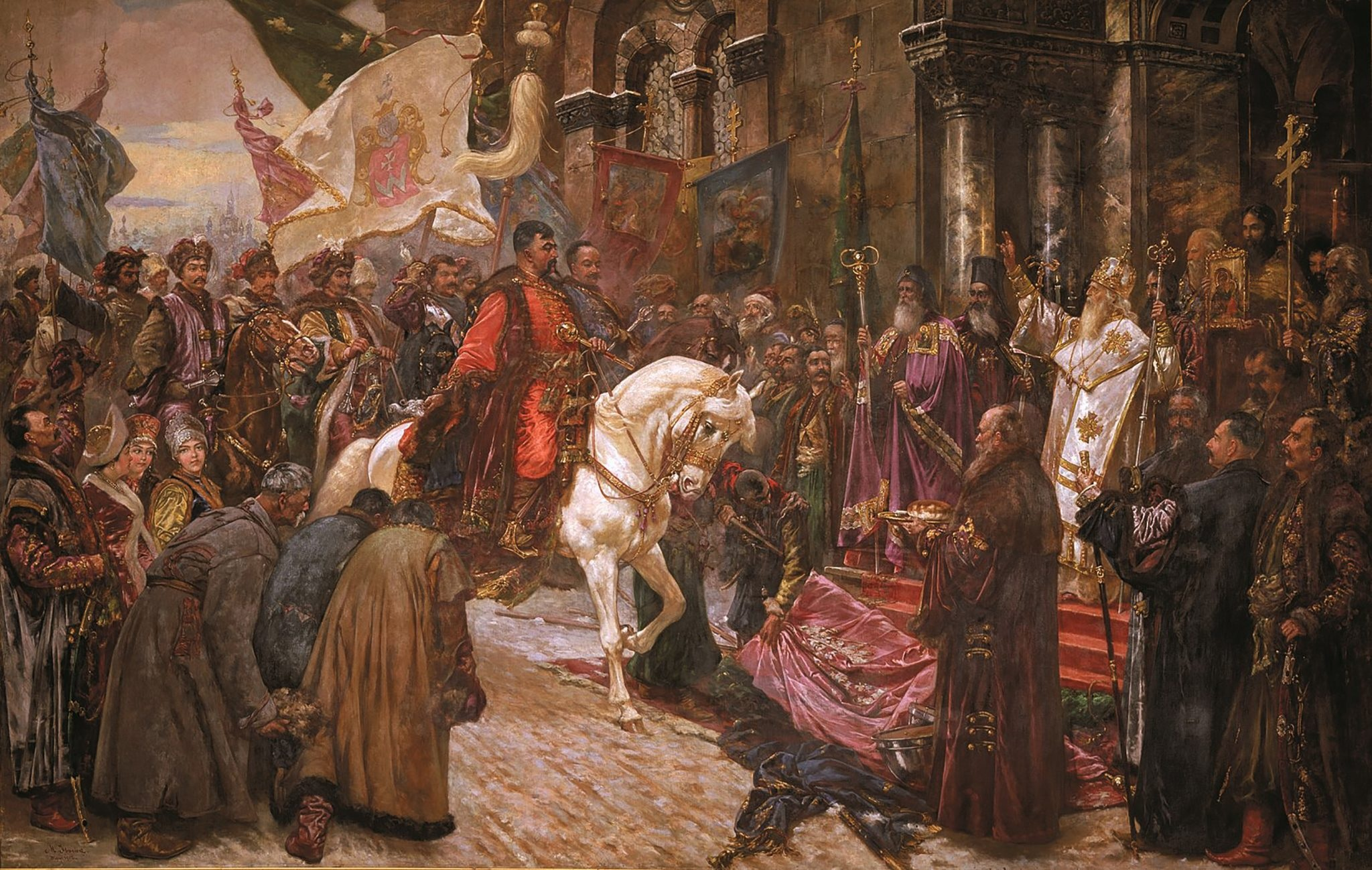
Bohdan Khmelnytsky's entry to Kyiv by Mykola Ivasyuk, end of the 19th century

The waning loyalty of the Cossacks, and the szlachta's arrogance towards them, resulted in several Cossack uprisings against the Polish–Lithuanian Commonwealth in the early 17th century. Finally, the King's adamant refusal to accede to the demand to expand the Cossack Registry prompted the largest and most successful of these: the Khmelnytsky Uprising, that began in 1648. Some Cossacks, including the Polish szlachta in Ukraine, converted to Eastern Orthodoxy, divided the lands of the Ruthenian szlachta, and became the Cossack szlachta. The uprising was one of a series of catastrophic events for the Commonwealth, known as The Deluge, which greatly weakened the Polish-Lithuanian Commonwealth and set the stage for its disintegration 100 years later.

Influential relatives of the Ruthenian and Lithuanian szlachta in Moscow helped to create the Russian–Polish alliance against Khmelnitsky's Cossacks, portrayed as rebels against order and against the private property of the Ruthenian Orthodox szlachta. Don Cossacks' raids on Crimea left Khmelnitsky without the aid of his usual Tatar allies. From the Russian perspective, the rebellion ended with the 1654 Treaty of Pereyaslav, in which, in order to overcome the Russian–Polish alliance against them, the Khmelnitsky Cossacks pledged their loyalty to the Russian Tsar. In return, the Tsar guaranteed them his protection; recognized the Cossack starshyna (nobility), their property, and their autonomy under his rule; and freed the Cossacks from the Polish sphere of influence and the land claims of the Ruthenian szlachta.

Only some of the Ruthenian szlachta of the Chernigov region, who had their origins in the Moscow state, saved their lands from division among Cossacks and became part of the Cossack szlachta. After this, the Ruthenian szlachta refrained from plans to have a Moscow Tsar as king of the Commonwealth, its own Michał Korybut Wiśniowiecki later becoming king. The last, ultimately unsuccessful, attempt to rebuild the Polish–Cossack alliance and create a Polish–Lithuanian–Ruthenian Commonwealth was the 1658 Treaty of Hadiach. The treaty was approved by the Polish king and the Sejm, and by some of the Cossack starshyna, including hetman Ivan Vyhovsky. The treaty failed, however, because the starshyna were divided on the issue, and it had even less support among rank-and-file Cossacks.

==== Relations with neighbours ====
As a result of the mid-17th century Khmelnytsky Uprising, the Zaporozhian Cossacks briefly established an independent state, which later became the autonomous Cossack Hetmanate (1649–1764). It was placed under the suzerainty of the Russian Tsar from 1667 but was ruled by local hetmans for a century. The principal political problem of the hetmans who followed the Pereyeslav Agreement was defending the autonomy of the Hetmanate from Russian/Muscovite centralism. The hetmans Ivan Vyhovsky, Petro Doroshenko and Ivan Mazepa attempted to resolve this by separating Ukraine from Russia.

Relations between the Hetmanate and their new sovereign began to deteriorate after the autumn of 1656, when the Muscovites, going against the wishes of their Cossack partners, signed an armistice with the Polish-Lithuanian Commonwealth in Vilnius. The Cossacks considered the Vilnius agreement a breach of the contract they had entered into at Pereiaslav. For the Muscovite tsar, the Pereiaslav Agreement signified the unconditional submission of his new subjects; the Ukrainian hetman considered it a conditional contract from which one party could withdraw if the other was not upholding its end of the bargain.

The Ukrainian hetman Ivan Vyhovsky, who succeeded Khmelnytsky in 1657, believed the Tsar was not living up to his responsibility. Accordingly, he concluded a treaty with representatives of the Polish king, who agreed to re-admit Cossack Ukraine by reforming the Polish-Lithuanian Commonwealth to create a third constituent, comparable in status to that of the Grand Duchy of Lithuania. The Union of Hadiach provoked a war between the Cossacks and the Muscovites/Russians that began in the fall of 1658.

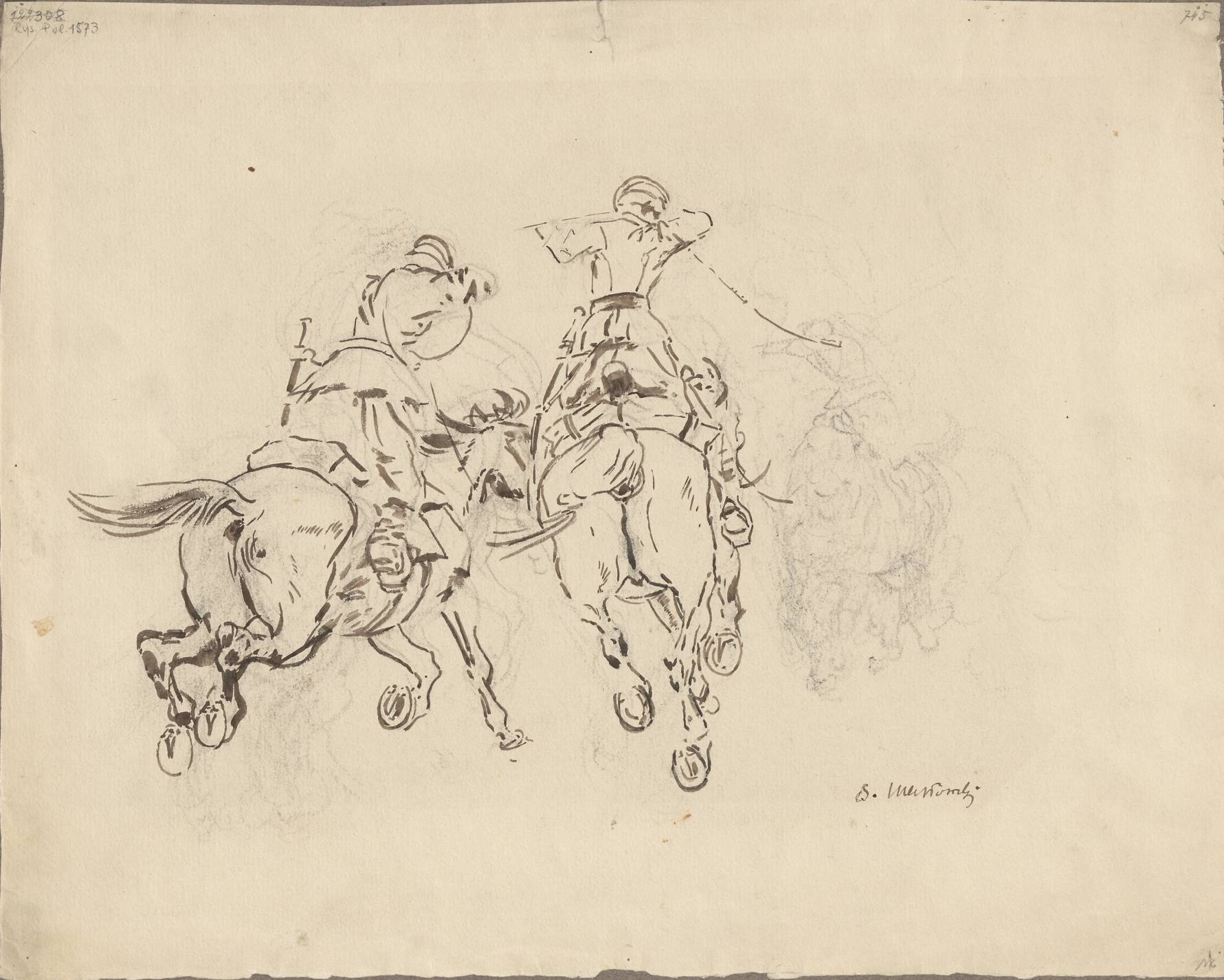
Kozacy (Cossacks), drawing by Stanisław Masłowski, c. 1900 (National Museum in Warsaw)

In June 1659, the two armies met near the town of Konotop. One army comprised Cossacks, Tatars, and Poles, and the other was led by a top Muscovite military commander of the era, Prince Aleksey Trubetskoy. After terrible losses, Trubetskoy was forced to withdraw to the town of Putyvl on the other side of the border. The battle is regarded as one of the Zaporizhian Cossacks' most impressive victories.

In 1659, Yurii Khmelnytsky was elected hetman of the Zaporizhian Host/Hetmanate, with the endorsement of Moscow and supported by common Cossacks unhappy with the conditions of the Union of Hadiach. In 1660, however, the hetman asked the Polish king for protection, leading to the period of Ukrainian history known as The Ruin.

==== Suppression of Cossack autonomy in the Russian Empire ====
Historian Gary Dean Peterson writes: "With all this unrest, Ivan Mazepa of the Ukrainian Cossacks was looking for an opportunity to secure independence from Russia and Poland". In response to Mazepa's alliance with Charles XII of Sweden, Peter I ordered the sacking of the then capital of the Hetmanate, Baturyn. The city was burnt and looted, and 11,000 to 14,000 of its inhabitants were killed. The destruction of the Hetmanate's capital was a signal to Mazepa and the Hetmanate's inhabitants of severe punishment for disloyalty to the Tsar's authority. The Zaporizhian Sich at Chortomlyk, which had existed since 1652, was also destroyed by Peter I's forces in 1709, in retribution for decision of its otaman Kost Hordiyenko, to ally with Mazepa.

Under Russian rule, the Cossack nation of the Zaporozhian Host was divided into two autonomous republics of the Russian Tsardom: the Cossack Hetmanate, and the more independent Zaporizhia. These organizations gradually lost their autonomy, and were abolished by Catherine II in the late 18th century. The Hetmanate became the governorship of Little Russia, and Zaporizhia was absorbed into New Russia.

According to the 1756 Zaporozhian Sich register, only about 30,000 people, 12,758 of whom were Cossack, lived across the Zaporozhian Cossack territories, a low figure due to frequent raids by Crimean Tatars. The demographic situation changed only with the end of the Russo-Turkish War of 1768–1774 and the creation of the Novorossiya Governorate, which led to the founding of major cities such as Kherson, Odesa, Mykolaiv, Yelisavetgrad and Yekaterinoslav

=== Black Sea, Azov and Danubian Sich Cossacks ===
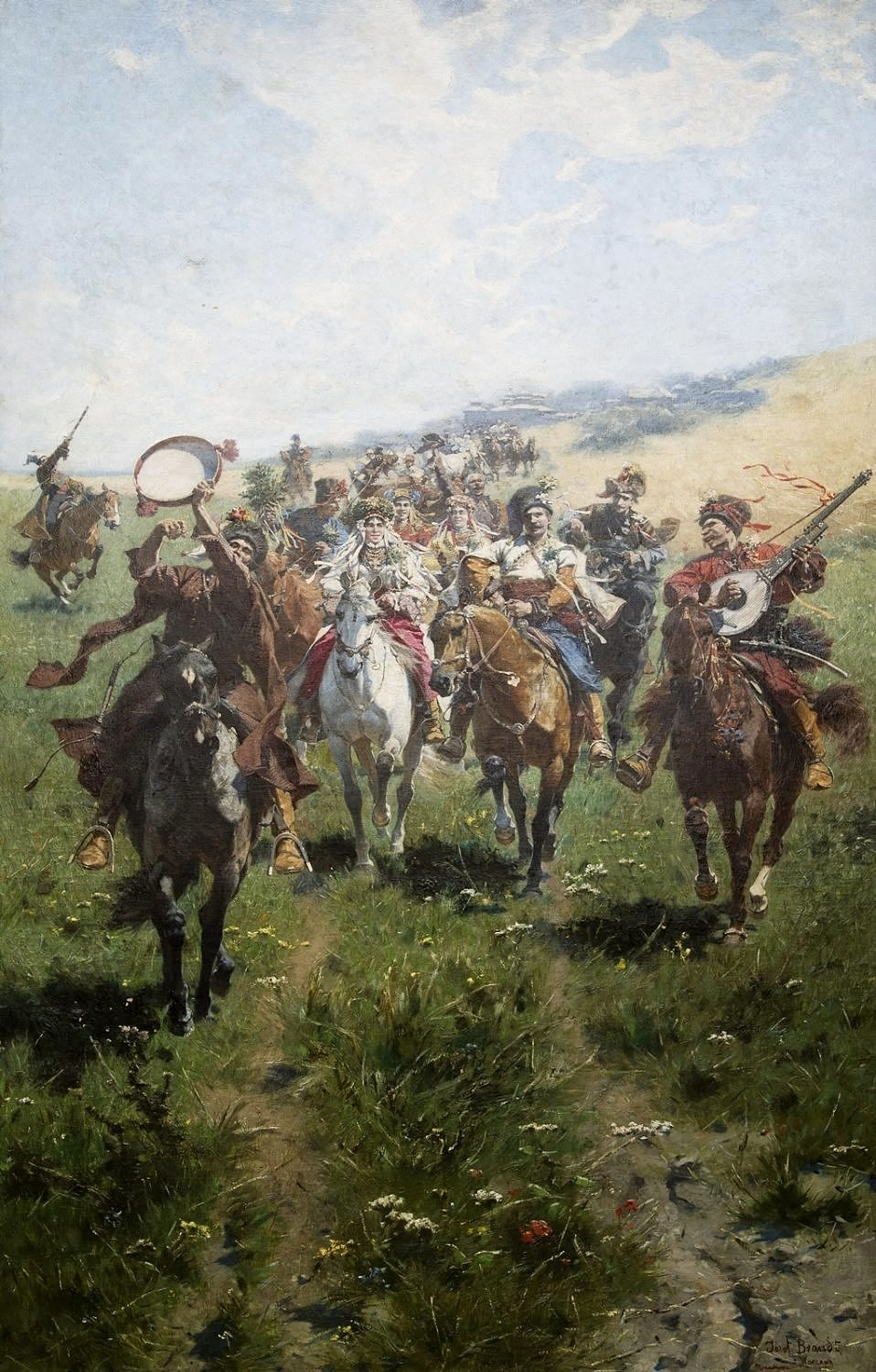
Cossack wedding, by Józef Brandt

With the destruction of the Zaporizhian Sich, a number of Ukrainian-speaking Eastern Orthodox Zaporozhian Cossacks fled to the territory under the control of the Ottoman Empire. Together with Cossacks of Greater Russian origin, as well as the vast majority of Old Believers and other people from "Greater Russia" (Muscovy), they settled in the area of the Danube river, and founded a new Sich. Many Ukrainian peasants and adventurers later joined the Danubian Sich. While Ukrainian folklore remembers the Danubian Sich, other new siches of Loyal Zaporozhians on the Bug and Dniester rivers did not achieve such fame. Other Cossacks settled on the Tisa river in the Austrian Empire, also forming a new Sich.

During the Cossack sojourn under Turkish rule, a new host was founded that numbered around 12,000 people by the end of 1778. Cossack settlement on the Russian border was approved by the Ottoman Empire after the Cossacks officially vowed to serve the sultan. Yet internal conflict, and the political maneuvering of the Russian Empire led to splits among the Cossacks. Some of the runaway Cossacks returned to Russia, where the Russian army used them to form new military bodies that also incorporated Greeks, Albanians and Crimean Tatars. After the Russo-Turkish war of 1787–1792, most of these Cossacks were absorbed into the Black Sea Cossack Host together with Loyal Zaporozhians. Most of the remaining Cossacks who had stayed in the Danube Delta returned to Russia in 1828. They settled in the area north of the Azov Sea, becoming known as the Azov Cossacks. The majority of Zaporizhian Cossacks who had remained loyal to Russia despite the destruction of Sich became known as Black Sea Cossacks. Both Azov and Black Sea Cossacks were resettled to colonize the Kuban steppe, a crucial foothold for Russian expansion in the Caucasus. In 1860, more Cossacks were resettled to the North Caucasus, and merged into the Kuban Cossack Host.

== Russian Cossacks ==
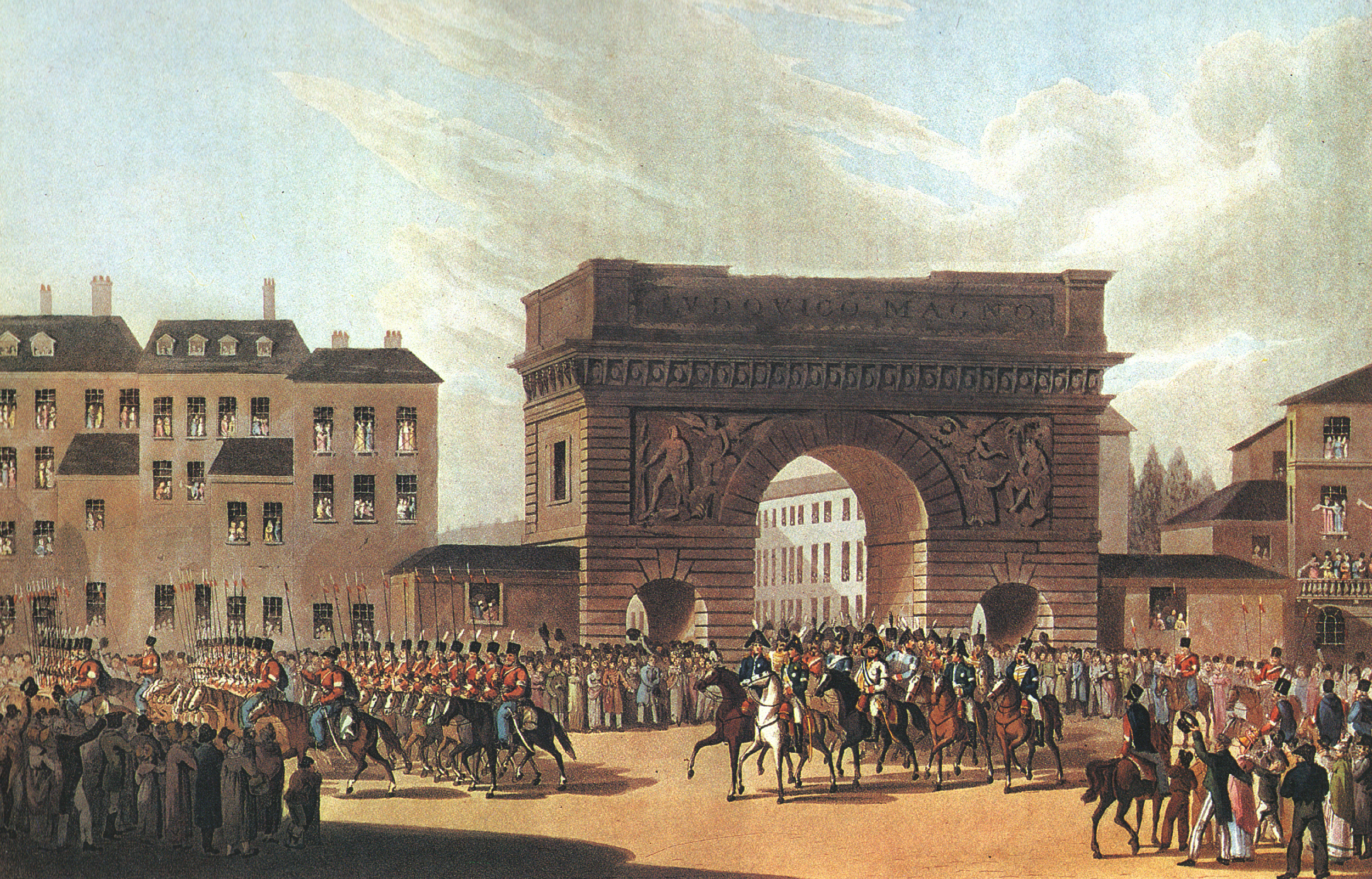
Imperial Russian Cossacks (left) at the Porte Saint-Martin in Paris in 1814

Russian Cossacks are thought to originate on the border with the steppe, and stretching from the middle Volga to Ryazan and Tula, then breaking abruptly to the south and extending to the Dnieper via Pereyaslavl. This area was settled by a population of free people practicing various trades and crafts.

These people, constantly facing the Tatar warriors on the steppe frontier, received the Turkic name Cossacks (Kazaks), which was then extended to other free people in Russia. Many Cumans, who had assimilated Khazars, retreated to the Principality of Ryazan (Grand Duchy of Ryazan) after the Mongol invasion. The oldest mention in the annals is of Cossacks of the Russian principality of Ryazan serving the principality in the battle against the Tatars in 1444. In the 16th century, the Cossacks (primarily of Ryazan) were grouped in military and trading communities on the open steppe, and began to migrate into the area of the Don.

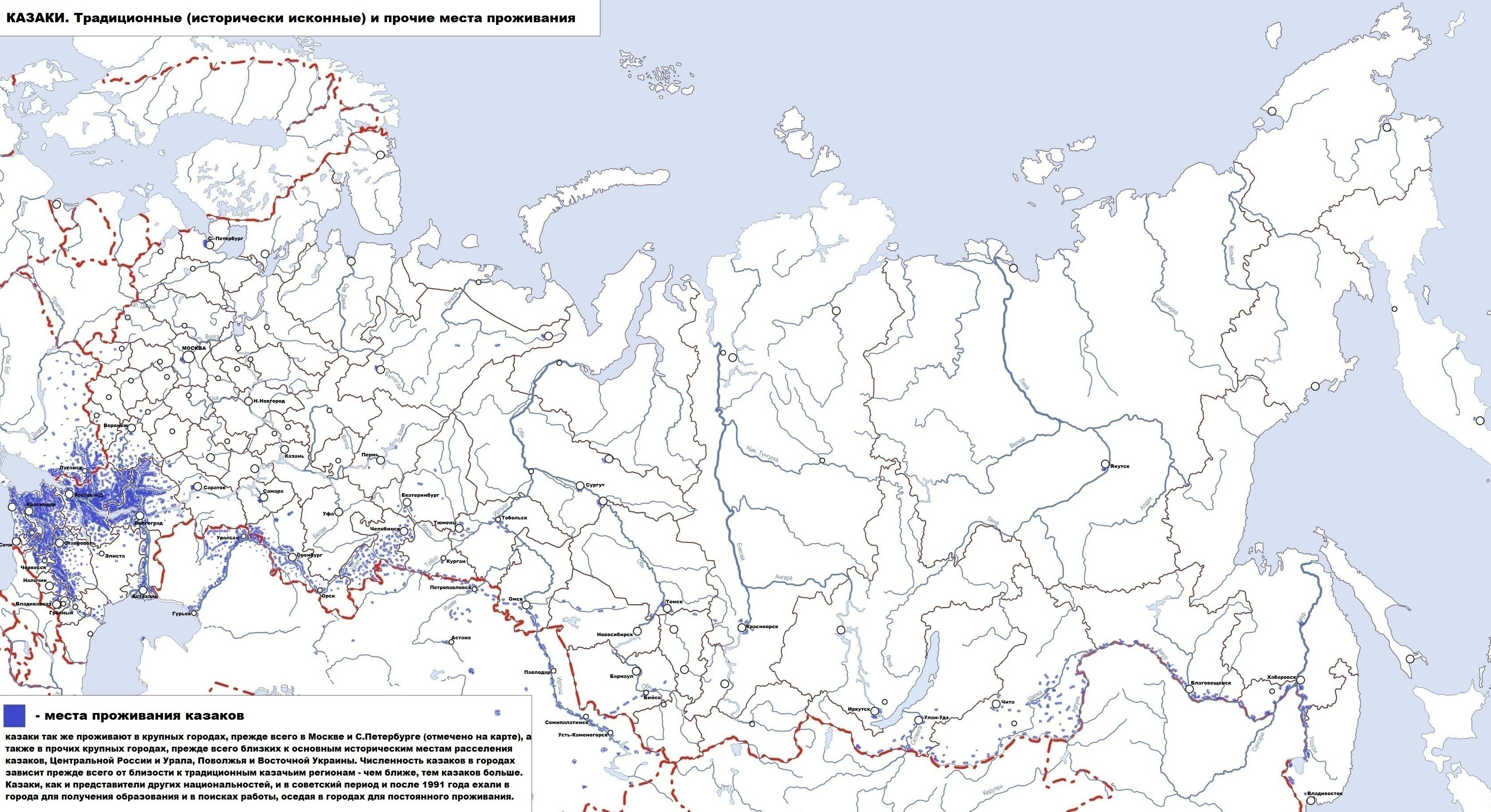
Distribution of Cossacks in Russia, eastern Ukraine and northern Kazakhstan

Cossacks served as border guards and protectors of towns, forts, settlements, and trading posts. They performed policing functions on the frontiers, and also came to represent an integral part of the Russian army. In the 16th century, to protect the borderland area from Tatar invasions, Cossacks carried out sentry and patrol duties, guarding against Crimean Tatars and nomads of the Nogai Horde in the steppe region.

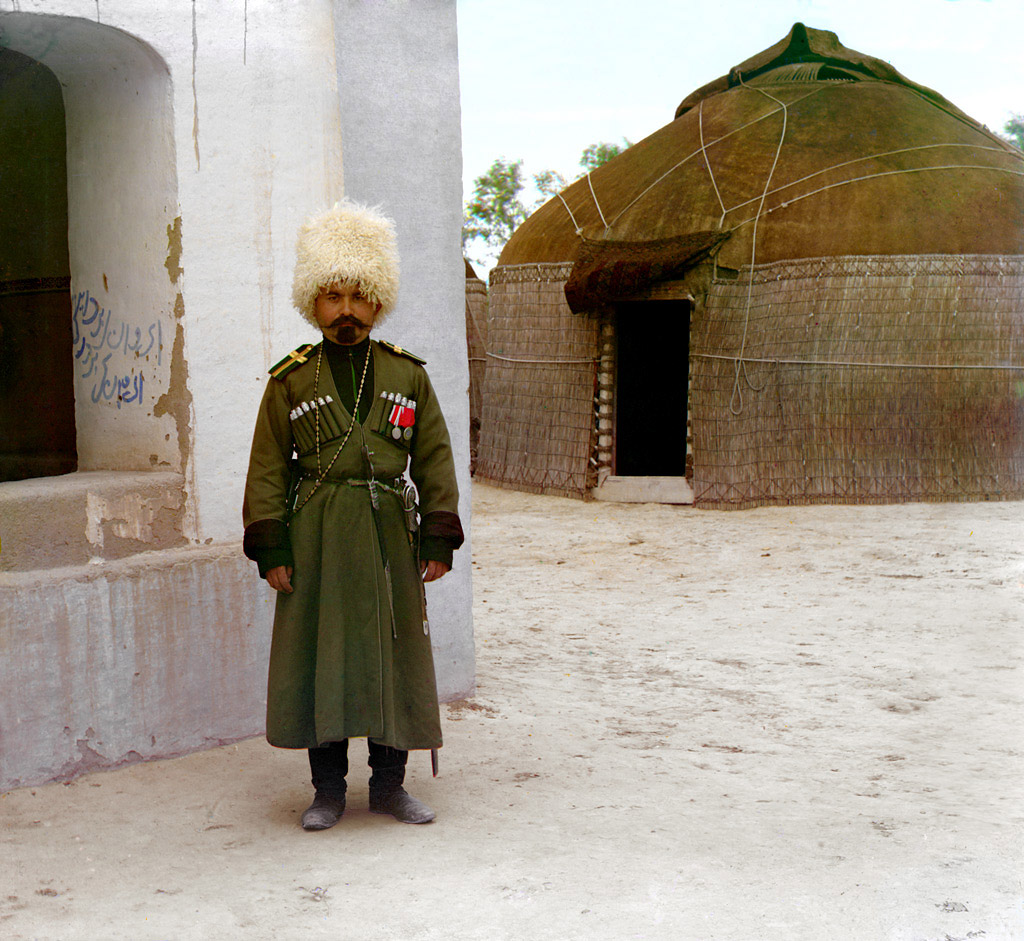
Semirechye Cossack, Semirechye, 1911

The most popular weapons of the Cossack cavalrymen were the sabre, or shashka, and the long spear.

From the 16th to 19th centuries, Russian Cossacks played a key role in the expansion of the Russian Empire into Siberia (particularly by Yermak Timofeyevich), the Caucasus, and Central Asia. Cossacks also served as guides to most Russian expeditions of civil and military geographers and surveyors, traders, and explorers. In 1648, the Russian Cossack Semyon Dezhnyov discovered a passage between North America and Asia. Cossack units played a role in many wars in the 17th, 18th, and 19th centuries, including the Russo-Turkish Wars, the Russo-Persian Wars, and the annexation of Central Asia.

Western Europeans had a lot of contact with Cossacks during the Seven Years' War, and had seen Cossack patrols in Berlin. During Napoleon's Invasion of Russia, Cossacks were the Russian soldiers most feared by the French troops. Napoleon himself stated, "Cossacks are the best light troops among all that exist. If I had them in my army, I would go through all the world with them." Cossacks also took part in the partisan war deep inside French-occupied Russian territory, attacking communications and supply lines. These attacks, carried out by Cossacks along with Russian light cavalry and other units, were one of the first developments of guerrilla warfare tactics and, to some extent, special operations as we know them today. Several thousands of Cossacks were commended by Pyotr Bagration during the French invasion of Russia behind Bug.

=== Don Cossacks ===
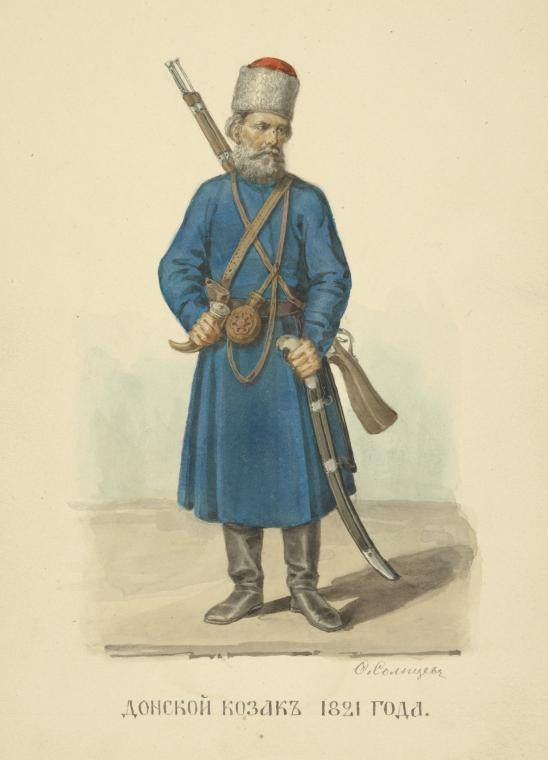
A Cossack from the Don area, 1821, illustration from Fyodor Solntsev, 1869

The Don Cossack Host (Russian: Всевеликое Войско Донское, Vsevelikoye Voysko Donskoye) was either an independent or an autonomous democratic republic, located in present-day Southern Russia. It existed from the end of the 16th century until the early 20th century. There are two main theories of the origin of the Don Cossacks. Most respected historians support the migration theory, according to which they were Slavic colonists. The various autochthonous theories popular among the Cossacks themselves do not find confirmation in genetic studies. The gene pool comprises mainly the East Slavic component, with a significant Ukrainian contribution. There is no influence of the peoples of the Caucasus; and the steppe populations, represented by the Nogais, have only limited impact.

The majority of Don Cossacks are either Eastern Orthodox or Christian Old Believers (старообрядцы). Prior to the Russian Civil War, there were numerous religious minorities, including Muslims, Subbotniks, and Jews. (Note: After the Caucasus war, both Russian Imperial policy and internal problems caused some Muslims, Subbotniks, Molokane, Jews, and various Christian minorities—both Cossack and non-Cossack—to move away from the Don area, usually to the newly conquered frontier areas or abroad. Many Muslim Cossacks moved to Turkey, because of a lack of Muslim brides in their villages. The Don Host resisted this policy and retained its minorities, as in the case of some Muslim Cossacks, and of Rostov-on-Don non-Cossack Jews.)

=== Kuban Cossacks ===
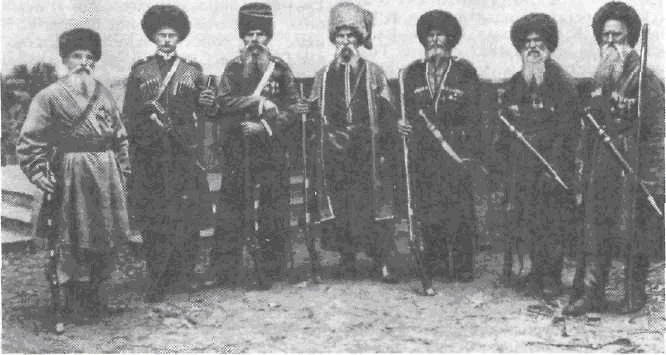
Kuban Cossacks armed with Kindjals & Khirimis, late 19th century

Kuban Cossacks are Cossacks who live in the Kuban region of Russia. Although many Cossack groups came to inhabit the Western North Caucasus, most of the Kuban Cossacks are descendants of the Black Sea Cossack Host (originally the Zaporozhian Cossacks), and the Caucasus Line Cossack Host.

During the Russian Civil War, Kuban Cossacks established their own state, the Kuban People's Republic. They attempted to form a federal union with Ukraine People's Republic, but it was defeated by the White Army forces undert Anton Denikin, and eventually Kuban was overcome by the Bolsheviks.

=== Terek Cossacks ===
The Terek Cossack Host was created in 1577 by free Cossacks resettling from the Volga to the Terek River. Local Terek Cossacks joined this host later. In 1792, the host was included in the Caucasus Line Cossack Host, from which it separated again in 1860, with Vladikavkaz as its capital. In 1916, the population of the host was 255,000, within an area of 1.9 million desyatinas.

=== Yaik Cossacks ===
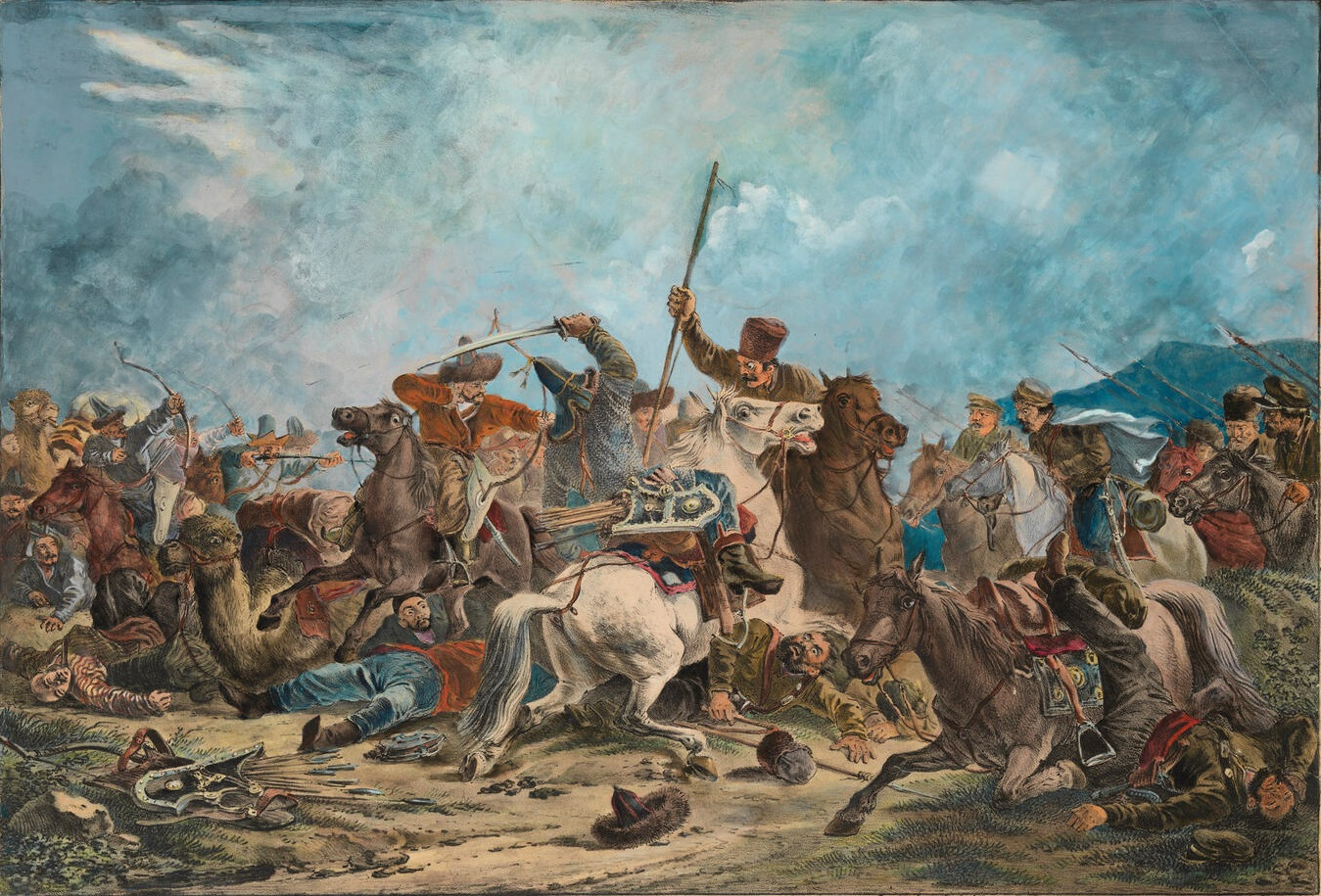
Ural Cossacks skirmish with Kazakhs (the Russians originally called the Kazakhs 'Kirgiz')

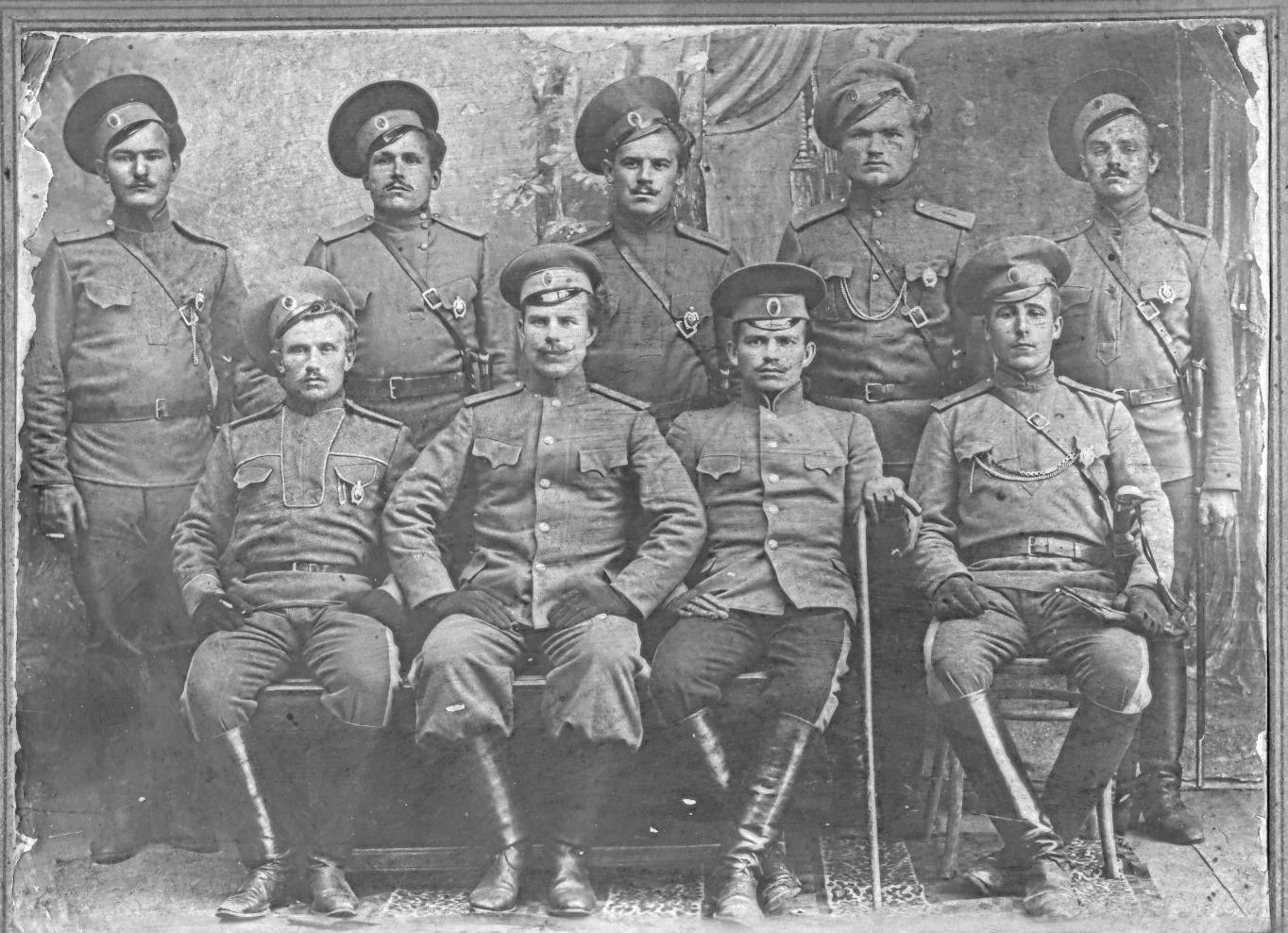
Yaik (Orenburg) Cossacks from Sakmara settlement; Alexander Mertemianovich Pogadaev standing at left, 1912

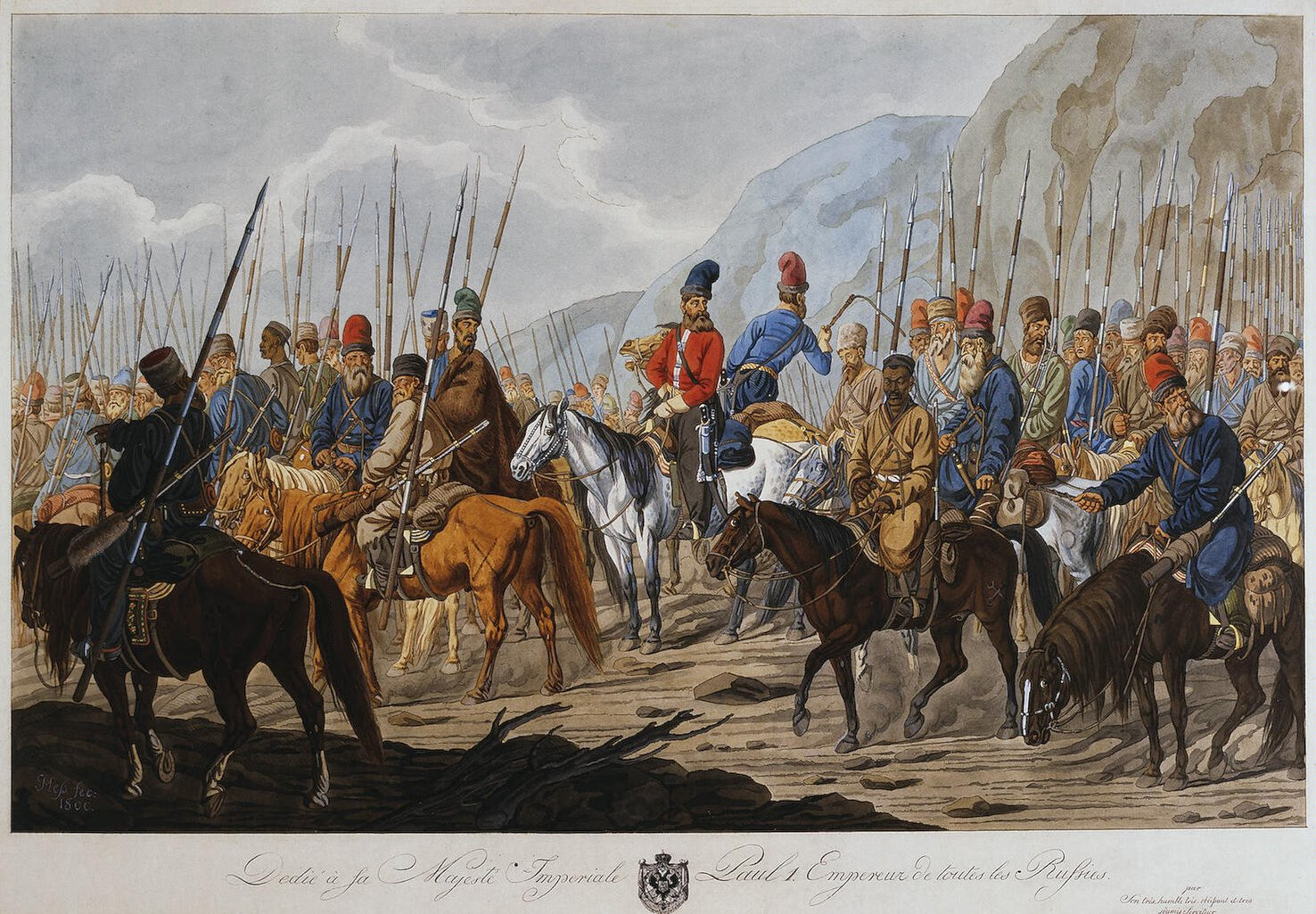
Ural Cossacks, c. 1799

The Ural Cossack Host was formed from the Ural Cossacks, who had settled along the Ural River. Their alternative name, Yaik Cossacks, comes from the river's former name, changed by the government after Pugachev's Rebellion of 1773–1775. The Ural Cossacks spoke Russian, and identified as having primarily Russian ancestry, but also incorporated many Tatars into their ranks. In 1577, twenty years after Moscow had conquered the Volga from Kazan to Astrakhan, the government sent troops to disperse pirates and raiders along the Volga. Among them was Yermak Timofeyevich. Some escaped to flee southeast to the Ural River, where they joined the Yaik Cossacks. In 1580, they captured Saraichik. By 1591, they were fighting on behalf of the government in Moscow. Over the next century, they were officially recognized by the imperial government.

=== Razin and Pugachev Rebellions ===
As a largely independent nation, the Cossacks had to defend their liberties and democratic traditions against the ever-expanding Muscovy, succeeded by the Russian Empire. Their tendency to act independently of the Tsardom of Russia increased friction. The Tsardom's power began to grow in 1613, with the ascension of Mikhail Romanov to the throne following the Time of Troubles. The government began attempting to integrate the Cossacks into the Russian Tsardom by granting elite status and enforcing military service, thus creating divisions among the Cossacks themselves as they fought to retain their traditions. The government's efforts to alter their traditional nomadic lifestyle resulted in the Cossacks being involved in nearly all the major disturbances in Russia over 200 years, including the rebellions led by Stepan Razin and Yemelyan Pugachev.

Stenka Razin Sailing in the Caspian Sea, by Vasily Surikov, 1906

As Russia regained stability, discontent grew within the serf and peasant populations. Under Alexis Romanov, Mikhail's son, the Code of 1649 divided the Russian population into distinct and fixed hereditary categories. The Code increased tax revenue for the central government and put an end to nomadism, to stabilize the social order by fixing people on the same land and in the same occupation as their families. Peasants were tied to the land, and townsmen were forced to take on their fathers' occupations. The increased tax burden fell mainly on the peasants, further widening the gap between the poor and wealthy. Human and material resources became limited as the government organized more military expeditions, putting even greater strain on the peasants. War with Poland and Sweden in 1662 led to a fiscal crisis, and rioting across the country. Taxes, harsh conditions, and the gap between social classes drove peasants and serfs to flee. Many went to the Cossacks, knowing that the Cossacks would accept refugees and free them.

The Cossacks experienced difficulties under Tsar Alexis as more refugees arrived daily. The Tsar gave the Cossacks a subsidy of food, money, and military supplies in return for acting as border defense. These subsidies fluctuated often; a source of conflict between the Cossacks and the government. The war with Poland diverted necessary food and military shipments to the Cossacks as fugitive peasants swelled the population of the Cossack host. The influx of refugees troubled the Cossacks, not only because of the increased demand for food but also because their large number meant the Cossacks could not absorb them into their culture by way of the traditional apprenticeship. Instead of taking these steps for proper assimilation into Cossack society, the runaway peasants spontaneously declared themselves Cossacks and lived alongside the true Cossacks, laboring or working as barge-haulers to earn food.

Divisions among the Cossacks began to emerge as conditions worsened and Mikhail's son Alexis took the throne. Older Cossacks began to settle and become prosperous, enjoying privileges earned through obeying and assisting the Muscovite system. The old Cossacks started giving up the traditions and liberties that had been worth dying for, to obtain the pleasures of an elite life. The lawless and restless runaway peasants who called themselves Cossacks looked for adventure and revenge against the nobility that had caused them suffering. These Cossacks did not receive the government subsidies that the old Cossacks enjoyed, and had to work harder and longer for food and money.

==== Razin's Rebellion ====
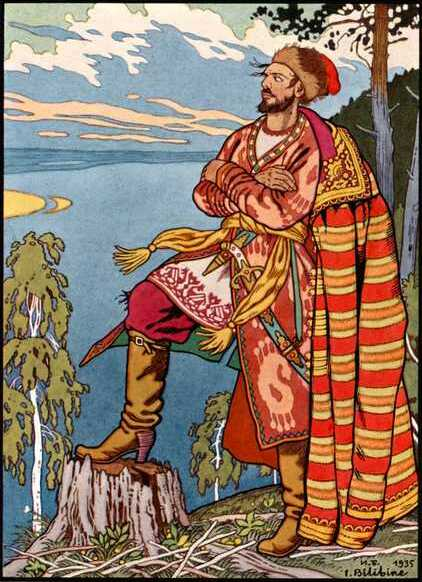
Stenka Razin, by Ivan Bilibin

The divisions between the elite and the lawless led to the formation of a Cossack army, beginning in 1667 under Stenka Razin, and ultimately to the failure of Razin's rebellion.

Stenka Razin was born into an elite Cossack family, and had made many diplomatic visits to Moscow before organizing his rebellion. The Cossacks were Razin's main supporters, and followed him during his first Persian campaign in 1667, plundering and pillaging Persian cities on the Caspian Sea. They returned in 1669, ill and hungry, tired from fighting, but rich with plundered goods. Russia tried to gain support from the old Cossacks, asking the ataman, or Cossack chieftain, to prevent Razin from following through with his plans. But the ataman was Razin's godfather, and was swayed by Razin's promise of a share of expedition wealth. His reply was that the elite Cossacks were powerless against the band of rebels. The elite did not see much threat from Razin and his followers either, although they realized he could cause them problems with the Muscovite system if his following developed into a rebellion against the central government.

Razin and his followers began to capture cities at the start of the rebellion, in 1669. They seized the towns of Tsaritsyn, Astrakhan, Saratov, and Samara, implementing democratic rule and releasing peasants from slavery as they went. Razin envisioned a united Cossack republic throughout the southern steppe, in which the towns and villages would operate under the democratic, Cossack style of government. Their sieges often took place in the runaway peasant Cossacks' old towns, leading them to wreak havoc there and take revenge on their old masters. The elder Cossacks began to see the rebels' advance as a problem, and in 1671 decided to comply with the government in order to receive more subsidies. On April 14, ataman Yakovlev led elders to destroy the rebel camp. They captured Razin, taking him soon afterward to Moscow to be executed.

Razin's rebellion marked the beginning of the end of traditional Cossack practices. In August 1671, Russian envoys administered the oath of allegiance and the Cossacks swore loyalty to the tsar. While they still had internal autonomy, the Cossacks became Russian subjects, a transition that was a dividing point again in Pugachev's Rebellion.

==== Pugachev's Rebellion ====
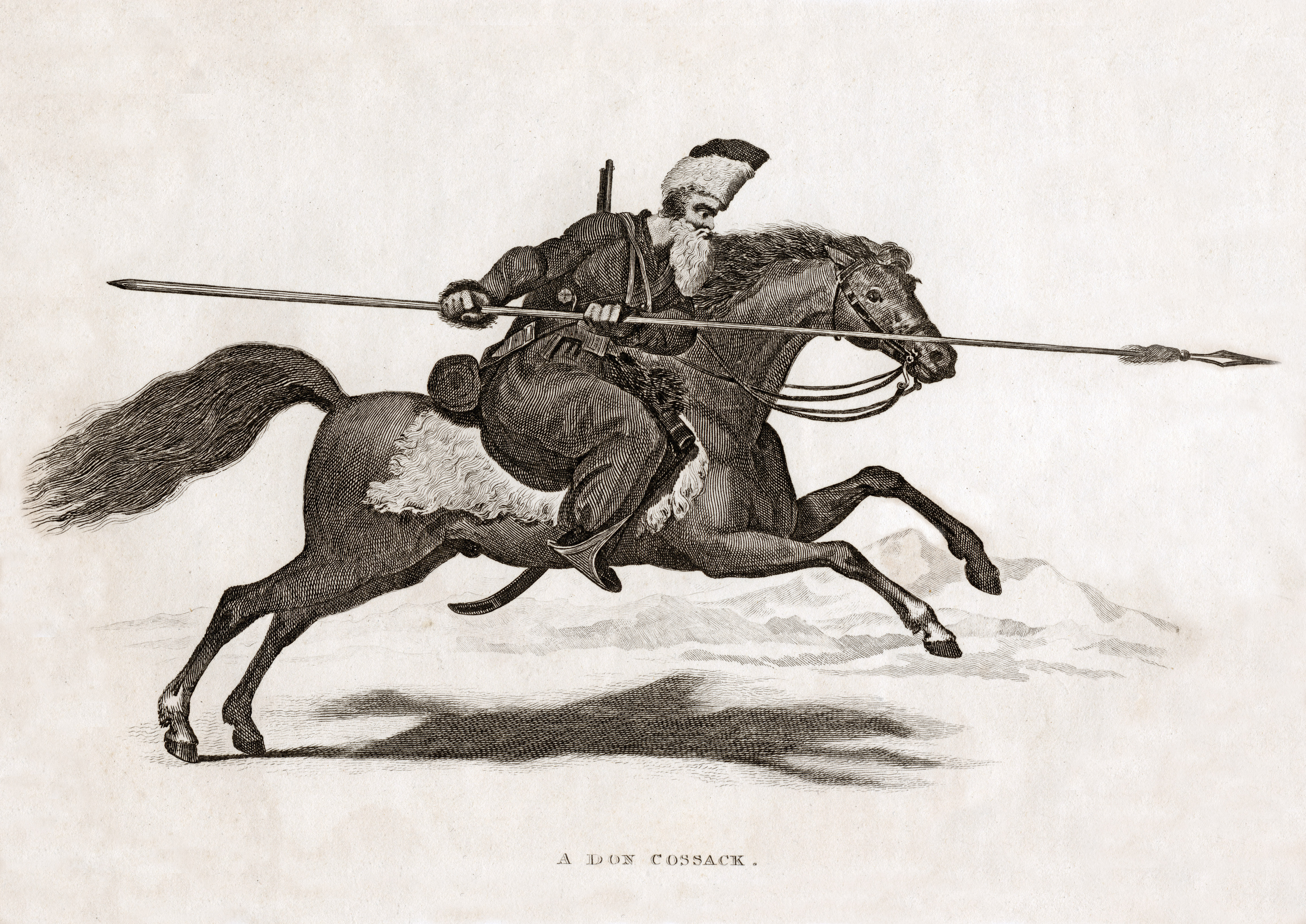
Don Cossack in the early 1800s

For the Cossack elite, noble status within the empire came at the price of their old liberties in the 18th century. Advancing agricultural settlement began to force the Cossacks to give up their traditional nomadic ways and adopt new forms of government. The government steadily changed the entire culture of the Cossacks. Peter the Great increased Cossack service obligations, and mobilized their forces to fight in far-off wars. Peter began establishing non-Cossack troops in fortresses along the Yaik River. In 1734, construction of a government fortress at Orenburg gave Cossacks a subordinate role in border defense. When the Yaik Cossacks sent a delegation to Peter with their grievances, Peter stripped the Cossacks of their autonomous status, and subordinated them to the War College rather than the College of Foreign Affairs. This consolidated the Cossacks' transition from border patrol to military servicemen. Over the next fifty years, the central government responded to Cossack grievances with arrests, floggings, and exiles.

Under Catherine the Great, beginning in 1762, the Russian peasants and Cossacks again faced increased taxation, heavy military conscription, and grain shortages, as before Razin's rebellion. Peter III had extended freedom to former church serfs, freeing them from obligations and payments to church authorities, and had freed other peasants from serfdom, but Catherine did not follow through on these reforms. In 1767, the Empress refused to accept grievances directly from the peasantry. Peasants fled once again to the lands of the Cossacks, in particular the Yaik Host, whose people were committed to the old Cossack traditions. The changing government also burdened the Cossacks, extending its reach to reform Cossack traditions. Among ordinary Cossacks, hatred of the elite and central government rose. In 1772, a six–month open rebellion ensued between the Yaik Cossacks and the central government.

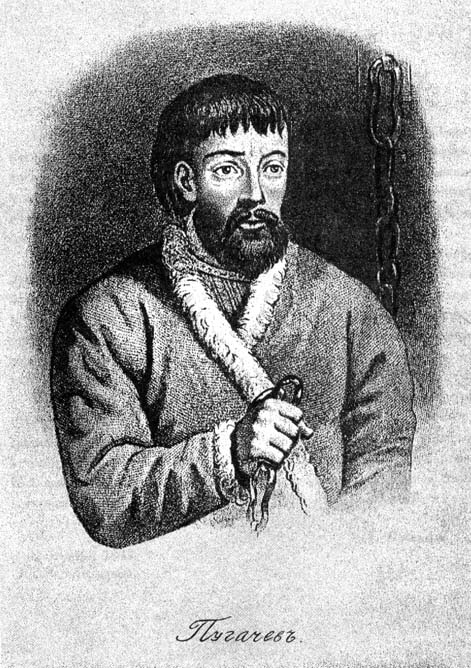
Yemelyan Pugachev in prison

Yemelyan Pugachev, a low-status Don Cossack, arrived in the Yaik Host in late 1772. There, he claimed to be Peter III, playing on the Cossack belief that Peter would have been an effective ruler but for his assassination in a plot by his wife, Catherine II. Many Yaik Cossacks believed Pugachev's claim, although those closest to him knew the truth. Others, who may have known of it, did not support Catherine II due to her disposal of Peter III, and also spread Pugachev's claim to be the late emperor.

The first of three phases of Pugachev's Rebellion began in September 1773. Most of the rebels' first prisoners were Cossacks who supported the elite. After a five-month siege of Orenburg, a military college became Pugachev's headquarters. Pugachev envisioned a Cossack tsardom, similar to Razin's vision of a united Cossack republic. The peasantry across Russia stirred with rumors and listened to the manifestos Pugachev issued. But the rebellion soon came to be seen as an inevitable failure. The Don Cossacks refused to help the final phase of the revolt, knowing that military troops were closely following Pugachev after lifting the siege of Orenburg, and following his flight from defeated Kazan. In September 1774, Pugachev's own Cossack lieutenants turned him over to the government troops.

Opposition to centralization of political authority led the Cossacks to participate in Pugachev's Rebellion. After their defeat, the Cossack elite accepted government reforms, hoping to secure status within the nobility. The ordinary Cossacks had to follow and give up their traditions and liberties.

=== In the Russian Empire ===
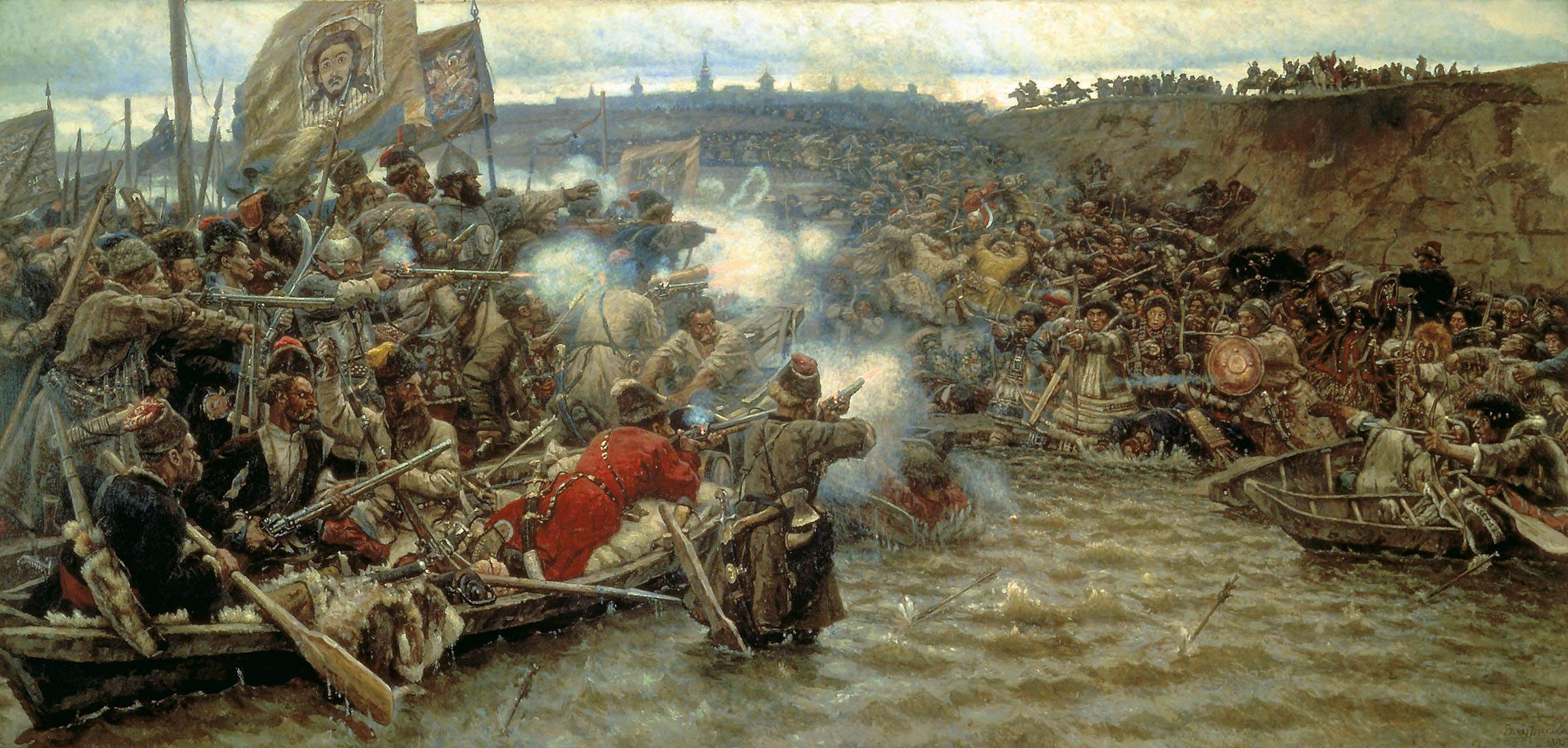
Conquest of Siberia by Yermak Timofeyevich, painting by Vasily Surikov

Cossack relations with the Tsardom of Russia were varied from the outset. At times they supported Russian military operations, at other times they rebelled against the central power. After one such uprising at the end of the 18th century, Russian forces destroyed the Zaporozhian Host. Many of the Cossacks who had remained loyal to the Russian Monarch and continued their service later moved to the Kuban. Others, choosing to continue a mercenary role, escaped control in the large Danube Delta. The service of the Cossacks in the Napoleonic wars led them to be celebrated as Russian folk heroes, and throughout the 19th century a "powerful myth" was promoted by the government that portrayed the Cossacks as having a special and unique bond to the Emperor. This image of the Cossacks as ultra-patriotic defenders of not only Russia, but also of the House of Romanov was embraced by many ordinary Cossacks, making them into a force for conservatism.

By the 19th century, the Russian Empire had annexed the territory of the Cossack Hosts, and controlled them by providing privileges for their service such as exemption from taxation and allowing them to own the land they farmed. At this time, the Cossacks served as military forces in many wars conducted by the Russian Empire. Cossacks were considered excellent for scouting and reconnaissance duties, and for ambushes. Their tactics in open battle were generally inferior to those of regular soldiers, such as the Dragoons. In 1840, the Cossack hosts included the Don, Black Sea, Astrakhan, Little Russia, Azov, Danube, Ural, Stavropol, Mesherya, Orenburg, Siberian, Tobolsk, Tomsk, Yeniseisk, Irkutsk, Sabaikal, Yakutsk, and Tartar voiskos. In the 1890s, the Ussuri, Semirechensk, and Amur Cossacks were added; the last had a regiment of elite mounted rifles.

Increasingly as the 19th century went on, the Cossacks served as a mounted para-military police force in all of the various provinces of the vast Russian Empire, covering a territory stretching across Eurasia from what is now modern Poland to the banks of the river Amur that formed the Russian-Chinese border. The police forces of the Russian Empire, especially in rural areas, were undermanned owing to the low wages while the officers of the Imperial Russian Army disliked having their units deployed to put down domestic unrest, which was viewed as destructive of morale and possibly an incentive to mutiny. For the government, deploying Cossacks as a para-military police force was the best solution as the Cossacks were viewed as one of the social groups most loyal to the House of Romanov while their isolation from local populations was felt to make them immune to revolutionary appeals. Traditionally, Cossacks were viewed in Russia as dashing, romantic horsemen with a rebellious and wild aura about them, but their deployment in the role of a mounted police force gave them a "novel" image as a rather violent and thuggish institution fiercely committed to upholding the social order. This change from an irregular cavalry force that fought against the enemies of Russia, such as the Ottoman Empire and France, to a repressive gendarmerie deployed against the subjects of the Empire caused much disquiet within the various Hosts, as it was contrary to the heroic ethos of frontier warfare that the Cossacks cherished.

In 1879, the Shah of Iran, Nasir al-Din, who had been impressed with the equestrian skills and distinctive uniforms of the Cossacks while on a visit to Russia the previous year, requested that the Emperor Alexander II sent some Cossacks to train a Cossack force for himself. Alexander granted his request and later in 1879 a group of 9 Cossacks led by Kuban Cossack Colonel Aleksey Domantovich arrived in Tehran to train the Persian Cossack Brigade. The shah very much liked the colorful uniforms of the Cossacks and Domantovich devised uniforms for one regiment of the brigade based on the uniforms of the Kuban Cossack Host and another regiment had its uniform based on the Terek Cossack Host. The uniforms of the Cossacks were based on the flamboyant costumes of the peoples of the Caucasus, and what in Russia were viewed as exotic and colorful uniforms were viewed in Iran as a symbol of Russianness. Nasir al-Din, who was widely regarded as a deeply superficial and shallow man, was not interested in having his Cossack Brigade be an effective military force, and for him merely seeing his brigade ride before him while dressed in their brightly colored uniforms was quite enough. Over the shah's indifference, Domantovich and his Cossacks worked hard on training the Cossack Brigade, which became the only disciplined unit in the entire Persian Army, and thus of considerable importance in maintaining the shah's authority.

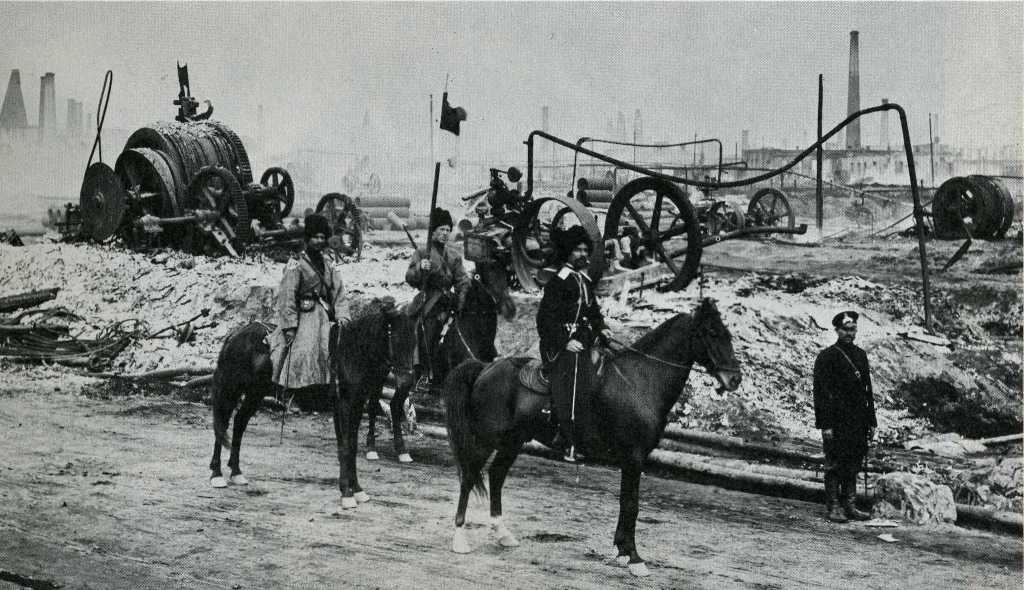
Cossack patrol near Baku oil fields, 1905

By the end of the 19th century, Cossack communities enjoyed a privileged tax-free status in the Russian Empire, although they had a 20-year military service commitment (reduced to 18 years from 1909). They were on active duty for five years, but could fulfill their remaining obligation with the reserves. At the beginning of the 20th century, the Russian Cossacks numbered 4.5 million. They were organized as independent regional hosts, each comprising a number of regiments. The need for the government to call up Cossack men to serve either with the Army or a mounted police force caused many social and economic problems, which compounded by the growing impoverishment the communities of the Hosts.

Treated as a separate and elite community by the Tsar, the Cossacks rewarded his government with strong loyalty. His administration frequently used Cossack units to suppress domestic disorder, especially during the Russian Revolution of 1905. The Imperial Government depended heavily on the perceived reliability of the Cossacks. By the early 20th century, their decentralized communities and semi-feudal military service were coming to be seen as obsolete. The Russian Army Command, which had worked to professionalize its forces, considered the Cossacks less well disciplined, trained, and mounted than the hussars, dragoons, and lancers of the regular cavalry. The Cossack qualities of initiative and rough-riding skills were not always fully appreciated. As a result, Cossack units were frequently broken up into small detachments for use as scouts, messengers, or picturesque escorts.

==== Cossacks between 1900 and 1917 ====
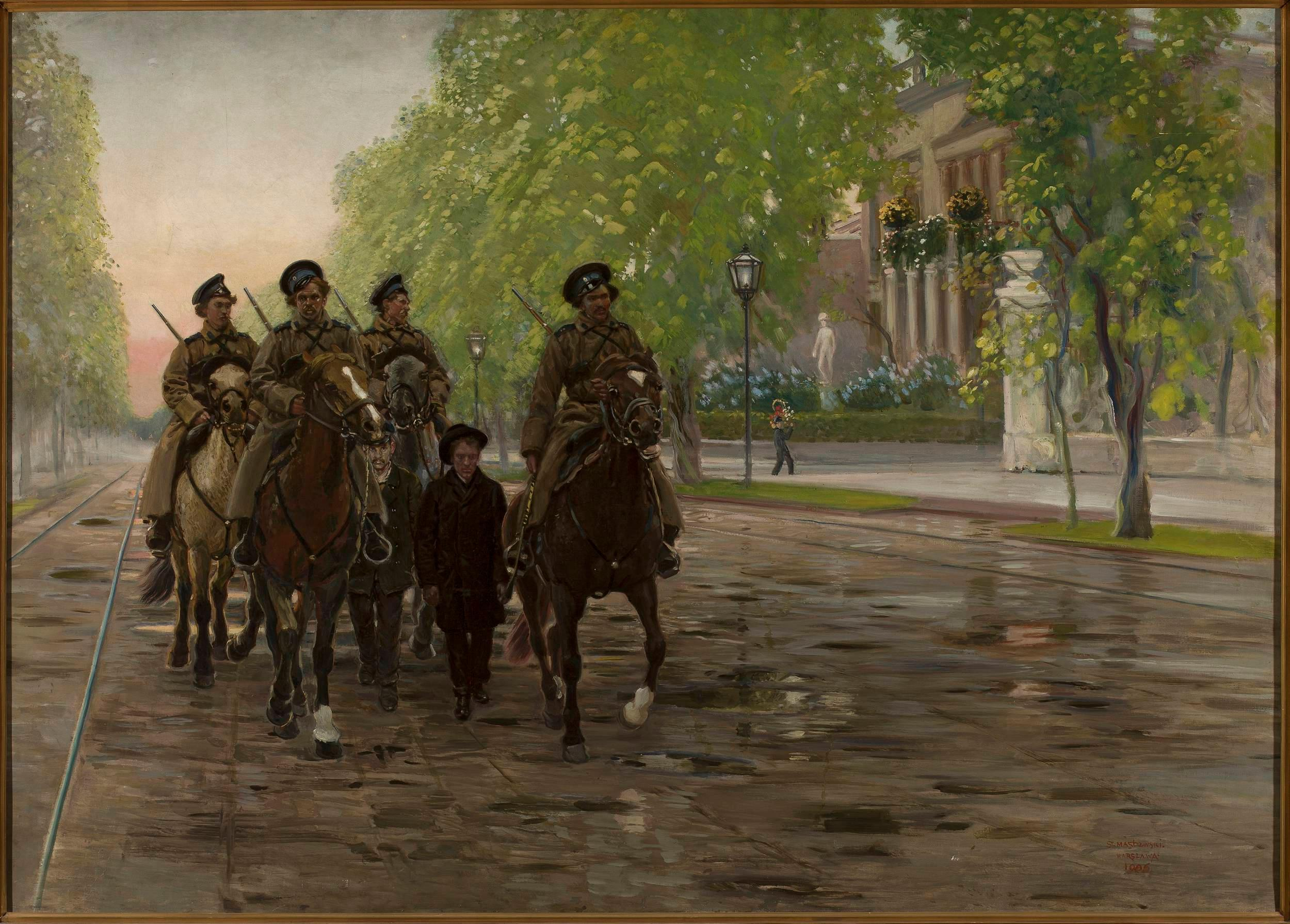
Wiosna roku 1905 (Spring of 1905) by Stanisław Masłowski, 1906 – Orenburg Cossacks patrol at Ujazdowskie Avenue in Warsaw (National Museum in Warsaw)

In 1905, the Cossack hosts experienced deep mobilization of their menfolk amid the fighting of the Russo-Japanese War in Manchuria and the outbreak of revolution within the Russian Empire. Like other peoples of the empire, some Cossack stanitsas voiced grievances against the regime by defying mobilization orders, or by making relatively liberal political demands. But these infractions were eclipsed by the prominent role of Cossack detachments in stampeding demonstrators and restoring order in the countryside. Subsequently, the wider population viewed the Cossacks as instruments of reaction. Tsar Nicholas II reinforced this concept by issuing new charters, medals, and bonuses to Cossack units in recognition for their performance during the Revolution of 1905.

In September 1906, reflecting the success of the Cossacks in putting down the Revolution of 1905, Polkovnik (Colonel) Vladimir Liakhov was sent to Iran to command the train and lead the Persian Cossack Brigade. Liakhov had led a Cossack squad in putting down the revolution in the Caucasus, and following the outbreak of the Constitutional Revolution in Iran he was sent to Tehran to recognize the Cossack Brigade as a force for power to the shah. The Persian Cossack Brigade had not been paid for months and proved to be dubious loyalty to the House of Qajar during the Constructional revolution while its Russian officers were uncertain what to do with Russia itself in revolution. Liakhov, a vigorous, able, and reactionary officer firmly committed to upholding absolute monarchies whatever in Russia or Iran, transformed the Persian Cossack Brigade into a mounted para-military police force rather than as a combat force. Liakhov was close to the new Shah, Mohammed Ali, who ascended to the Peacock Throne in January 1907, and it was due to the shah's patronage that Liakhov transformed the Persian Cossack Brigade into the main bulwark of the Iranian state. In June 1908, Liakhov led the Cossack Brigade in bombarding the Majlis (Parliament) while being appointed military governor of Tehran as the shah attempted to do away with the constitution his father had been forced to grant in 1906 Reza Khan, who became the first Iranian to command the Cossack Brigade led the coup d'état in 1921 and in 1925 deposed the Qajars to found a new dynasty.

After the outbreak of World War I in August 1914, Cossacks became a key component in the cavalry of the Imperial Russian Army. The mounted Cossacks made up 38 regiments, plus some infantry battalions and 52 horse artillery batteries. Initially, each Russian cavalry division included a regiment of Cossacks in addition to regular units of hussars, lancers, and dragoons. By 1916, the Cossacks' wartime strength had expanded to 160 regiments, plus 176 independent sotnias (squadrons) employed as detached units.

The importance of cavalry in the frontlines faded after the opening phase of the war settled into a stalemate. During the remainder of the war, Cossack units were dismounted to fight in trenches, held in reserve to exploit a rare breakthrough, or assigned various duties in the rear. Those duties included rounding up deserters, providing escorts to war prisoners, and razing villages and farms in accordance with Russia's scorched earth policy.

== Cossacks after the Russian Revolution ==
=== February Revolution, 1917 ===
==== In Greater Russia ====
At the outbreak of the disorder on 8 March 1917 that led to the overthrow of the tsarist regime, approximately 3,200 Cossacks from the Don, Kuban, and Terek Hosts were stationed in Petrograd. Although they comprised only a fraction of the 300,000 troops in the proximity of the Russian capital, their general defection on the second day of unrest (10 March) enthused raucous crowds and stunned the authorities and remaining loyal units.

In the aftermath of the February Revolution, the Cossacks hosts were authorized by the War Ministry of the Russian Provisional Government to overhaul their administrations. Cossack assemblies (known as krugs or, in the case of the Kuban Cossacks, a rada) were organized at regional level to elect atamans and pass resolutions. At national level, an all-Cossack congress was convened in Petrograd. This congress formed the Union of Cossack Hosts, ostensibly to represent the interests of Cossacks across Russia.

During the course of 1917, the nascent Cossack governments formed by the krugs and atamans increasingly challenged the Provisional Government's authority in the borderlands. The various Cossack governments themselves faced rivals, in the form of national councils organized by neighboring minorities, and of soviets and zemstvos formed by non-Cossack Russians, especially the so-called "outlanders" who had immigrated to Cossack lands.

==== In Ukraine ====
Similarly to the events in imperial Cossack hosts, a revival of Cossack self-organization also took place in Ukraine, inspired by the traditions of the Zaporozhian Sich and Cossack Hetmanate. In April 1917 a congress in Zvenyhorodka, Kyiv Governorate, established Free Cossacks as a volunteer militia in order "to defend the liberties of the Ukrainian people" and maintain civil order.

The revived Cossack structure in Ukraine was organized according to the territorial principle, with villages providing companies of volunteers, which were grouped into a kurin (battalion) on the volost level, subordinate to a regiment led by polkovnyk, which was itself part of a kish (division) led by an Ottoman. All officers of Free Cossacks were elected, and funds were provided from taxation. Most volunteers of the organization were peasants, but industrial workers did also enlist themselves, especially in cities.

During 1917 the Free Cossack movement spread around Kyiv, Volhynia, Kherson, Poltava and Chernihiv governorates. At the All-Ukrainian Congress of Free Cossacks in Chyhyryn on 16–20 October 1917 Pavlo Skoropadskyi was elected otaman of the movement.

=== Bolshevik uprising and Civil War, 1917–1922 ===
==== Cossack autonomies in Don, Kuban and North Caucasus ====
Soon after the Bolsheviks seized power in Petrograd on 7–8 November 1917, most Cossack atamans and their government refused to recognize the legitimacy of the new regime. The Don Cossack ataman, Aleksey Kaledin, went as far as to invite opponents of the Bolsheviks to the Don Host. But the position of many Cossack governments was far from secure, even within the boundaries of their hosts. In some areas, soviets formed by outlanders and soldiers rivaled the Cossack government, and ethnic minorities also tried to acquire a measure of self-rule. Even the Cossack communities themselves were divided, as the atamans tended to represent the interests of prosperous landowners and the officer corps. Poorer Cossacks, and those serving in the army, were susceptible to Bolshevik propaganda promising to spare "toiling Cossacks" from land appropriation.

The unwillingness of rank-and-file Cossacks to vigorously defend the Cossack government enabled the Red Army to occupy the vast majority of Cossack lands by late spring of 1918. But the Bolsheviks' policy of requisitioning grain and foodstuffs from the countryside to supply Russia's starving northern cities quickly fomented revolt among Cossack communities. These Cossack rebels elected new atamans and made common cause with other anticommunist forces, such as the Volunteer Army in South Russia. Subsequently, the Cossack homelands became bases for the White movement during the Russian Civil War.

Throughout the civil war, Cossacks sometimes fought as an independent ally, and other times as an auxiliary, of White armies. In South Russia, the Armed Forces of South Russia (AFSR) under General Anton Denikin relied heavily on conscripts from the Don and Kuban Cossack Hosts to fill their ranks. Through the Cossacks, the White armies acquired experienced, skilled horsemen that the Red Army was unable to match until late in the conflict. But the relationship between Cossack governments and the White leaders was frequently acrimonious. Cossack units were often ill-disciplined, and prone to bouts of looting and violence that caused the peasantry to resent the Whites. In Ukraine, Kuban and Terek Cossack squadrons carried out pogroms against Jews, despite orders from Denikin condemning such activity. Kuban Cossack politicians, wanting a semi-independent state of their own, frequently agitated against the AFSR command. In the Russian Far East, anticommunist Transbaikal and Ussuri Cossacks undermined the rear of Siberia's White armies by disrupting traffic on the Trans-Siberian Railway and engaging in acts of banditry that fueled a potent insurgency in that region.

As the Red Army gained the initiative in the civil war during late 1919 and early 1920, Cossack soldiers, their families, and sometimes entire stanitsas retreated with the Whites. Some continued to fight with the Whites in the conflict's waning stages in Crimea and the Russian Far East. As many as 80,000–100,000 Cossacks eventually joined the defeated Whites in exile.

Although the Cossacks were sometimes portrayed by Bolsheviks, and later by émigré historians, as a monolithic counterrevolutionary group during the civil war, there were many Cossacks who fought with the Red Army throughout the conflict, known as Red Cossacks. Many poorer Cossack communities also remained receptive to the communist message. In late 1918 and early 1919, widespread desertion and defection among Don, Ural, and Orenburg Cossacks fighting with the Whites produced a military crisis that was exploited by the Red Army in those sectors. After the main White armies were defeated in early 1920, many Cossack soldiers switched their allegiance to the Bolsheviks, and fought with the Red Army against the Poles and in other operations.

On 22 December 1917, the Council of People's Commissars effectively abolished the Cossack estate by ending their military service requirements and privileges. After the widespread anticommunist rebellions among Cossacks in 1918, the Soviet regime's approach hardened in early 1919, when the Red Army occupied Cossack districts in the Urals and northern Don. The Bolsheviks embarked on a policy of "de-Cossackization", intended to end the Cossack threat to the Soviet regime. This was pursued through resettlement, widespread executions of Cossack veterans from the White armies, and favoring the outlanders within the Cossack hosts. Ultimately, the de-Cossackization campaign led to a renewed rebellion among Cossacks in Soviet-occupied districts and produced a new round of setbacks for the Red Army in 1919.

When the victorious Red Army again occupied Cossack districts in late 1919 and 1920, the Soviet regime did not officially reauthorize the implementation of de-Cossackization. There is, however, disagreement among historians as to the degree of Cossack's persecution by the Soviet regime. For example, the Cossack hosts were broken up among new provinces or autonomous republics. Some Cossacks, especially in areas of the former Terek host, were resettled so their lands could be turned over to natives displaced from them during the initial Russian and Cossack colonization of the area. At the local level, the stereotype that Cossacks were inherent counterrevolutionaries likely persisted among some Communist officials, causing them to target, or discriminate against, Cossacks despite orders from Moscow to focus on class enemies among Cossacks rather than the Cossack people in general.

==== Ukrainian State ====
Until January 1918, the Free Cossacks of Ukraine were subordinate to the Ukrainian General Secretariat of Internal Affairs. With the beginning of the Ukrainian-Soviet War, their units were incorporated into the regular army. However, after a number of battles against the Bolsheviks, Free Cossacks were disarmed in compliance with orders of the German command, whose troops had occupied Ukraine in March–April 1918 after the Treaty of Brest-Litovsk.

On 29 April 1918 Pavlo Skoropadskyi, the earlier leader of Free Cossacks, was proclaimed Hetman of Ukraine at a congress of the conservative All-Ukrainian Union of Landowners. This coup was backed by generals of German and Austrian armies which were occupying Ukraine at that time. The previously democratic Ukrainian People's Republic was replaced with the Hetmanate, the Central Rada and the Council of Ministers of the Ukrainian People's Republic were abolished, with all their powers, as well as command over the military, being transferred to Skoropadskyi, and private land ownership was reinstated. Local administration was entrusted to commissioners personally appointed by the hetman.

To achieve legitimacy among the Ukrainian population, the Skoropadskyi styled his regime as a continuation of Ukrainian Cossack traditions of the 17-18th centuries. The hetman's government included representatives of old Cossack nobility (starshyna), most prominently Fedir Lyzohub (head of the Conucil of Ministers) and Dmytro Doroshenko (Minister of Foreign Affairs). Skoropadskyi himself supported the idea of reviving the Cossack class in Ukraine as a privileged social group personally loyal to the hetman. However, his initiative was viewed with skepticism by his ministers, and the law on re-establishment of Cossack administration in Ukraine was adopted only in October 1918, shortly before the hetman's resignation, and never realized. - During Skoropadskyi's tenure in power the Ukrainian State developed diplomatic ties with Cossack entities in the Kuban and Don region.

=== Cossacks in the Soviet Union, 1922–1945 ===
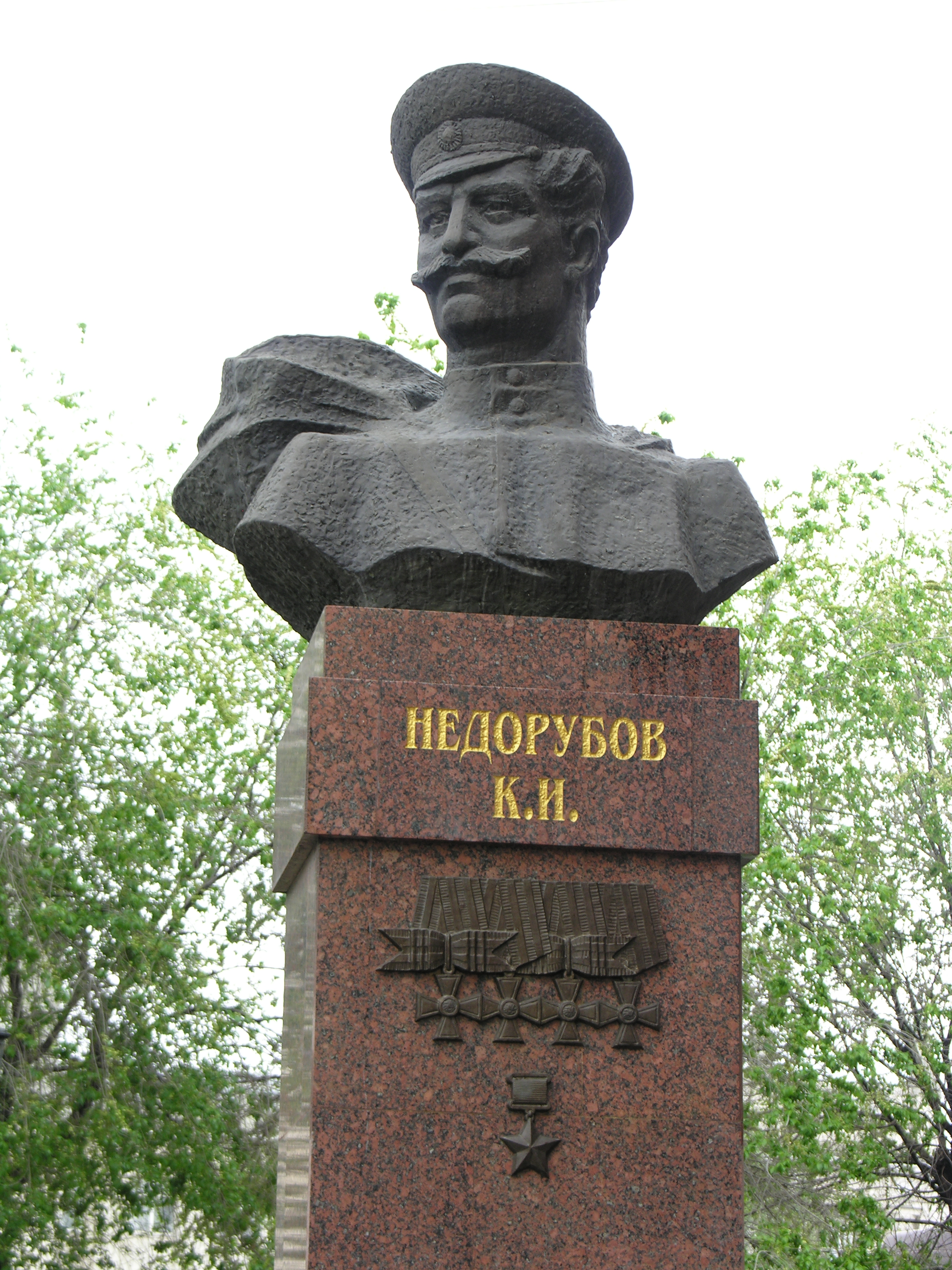
Konstantin Nedorubov: Don Cossack, full cavalier of St. George, Hero of the Soviet Union. Aged 52 when WWII began, he did not qualify for the regular draft and volunteered in the 41st Don Cossack Cavalry division. He was awarded the title Hero of the Soviet Union for his fight against Nazi invaders, credited in particular with killing some 70 Nazi combatants during the 1942 defence of Maratuki village.

Rebellions in the former Cossack territories erupted occasionally during the interwar period. In 1920–1921, disgruntlement with continued Soviet grain-requisitioning activities provoked a series of revolts among Cossack and outlander communities in South Russia. The former Cossack territories of South Russia and the Urals also experienced a devastating famine in 1921–1922. In 1932–1933, another famine, known as the Holodomor, devastated Ukraine and some parts of South Russia, causing a population decline of about 20–30%. While urban areas were less affected, the decline was even higher in the rural areas, populated largely by Cossacks. Robert Conquest estimates the number of famine-related deaths in the Northern Caucasus at about one million. Government officials expropriated grain and other produce from rural Cossack families, leaving them to starve and die. Many families were forced from their homes in the severe winter and froze to death. Mikhail Sholokhov's letters to Joseph Stalin document the conditions and widespread deaths, as do eyewitness accounts. Besides starvation, the collectivization and dekulakization campaigns of the early 1930s threatened Cossacks with deportation to labor camps, or outright execution by Soviet security organs.

In April 1936, the Soviet regime began to relax its restrictions on Cossacks, allowing them to serve openly in the Red Army. Two existing cavalry divisions were renamed as Cossack divisions, and three new Cossack cavalry divisions were established. Under the new Soviet designation, anyone from the former Cossack territories of the North Caucasus provided they were not Circassians or other ethnic minorities, could claim Cossack status.

In World War II, during the German invasion of the Soviet Union, many Cossacks continued to serve in the Red Army. Some fought as cavalry in the Cossack divisions, such as the 17th Kuban Cossack Cavalry Corps and the famous Lev Dovator Corps, later awarded the honorific designation "guard" in recognition of its performance. Other Cossacks fought as partisans, although the partisan movement did not acquire significant traction during the German occupation of the traditional Cossack homelands in the North Caucasus.

The 4th Guards Cossacks Cavalry Corps took part in the Moscow Victory Parade of 1945 on Red Square.

=== Anticommunist Cossacks in exile and World War II, 1920–1945 ===
==== Russian Cossack emigration ====
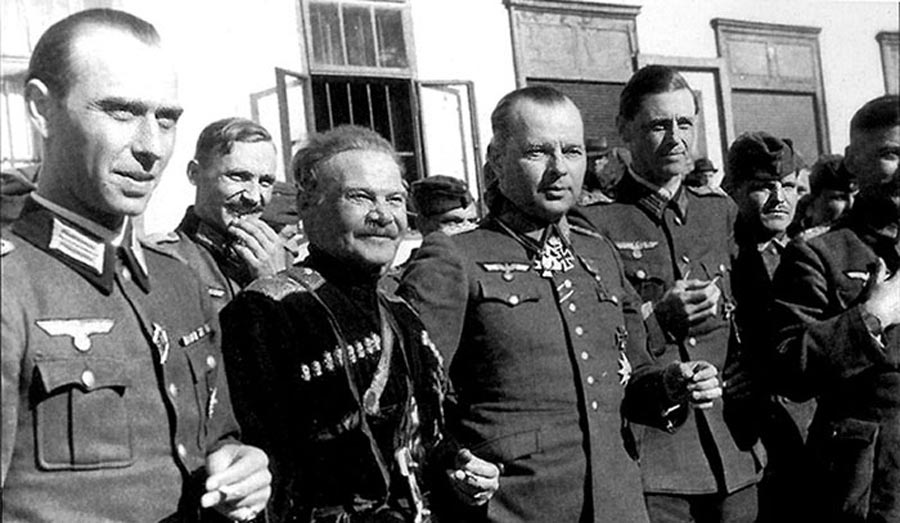
General Andrei Shkuro and Helmuth von Pannwitz in 1943

The Cossack emigration consisted largely of relatively young men who had served, and retreated with, the White armies. Although hostile to communism, the Cossack émigrés remained broadly divided over whether their people should pursue a separatist course to acquire independence or retain their close ties with a future post-Soviet Russia. Many quickly became disillusioned with life abroad. Throughout the 1920s, thousands of exiled Cossacks voluntarily returned to Russia through repatriation efforts sponsored by France, the League of Nations, and even the Soviet Union.

The Cossacks who remained abroad settled primarily in Bulgaria, Czechoslovakia, Yugoslavia, France, Xinjiang, and Manchuria. Some managed to create farming communities in Yugoslavia and Manchuria, but most eventually took up employment as laborers in construction, agriculture, or industry. A few showcased their lost culture to foreigners by performing stunts in circuses or serenading audiences in choirs.

Cossacks who were determined to carry on the fight against communism frequently found employment with foreign powers hostile to Soviet Russia. In Manchuria, thousands of Cossacks and White émigrés enlisted in the army of that region's warlord, Zhang Zuolin. After Japan's Kwantung Army occupied Manchuria in 1932, the ataman of the Transbaikal Cossacks, Grigory Semyonov, led collaboration efforts between Cossack émigrés and the Japanese military.

In the initial phase of Germany's invasion of the Soviet Union, Cossack émigrés were initially barred from political activity or travelling into the occupied Eastern territories. Hitler had no intention of entertaining the political aspirations of the Cossacks, or any minority group, in the USSR. As a result, collaboration between Cossacks and the Wehrmacht began in ad hoc manner through localized agreements between German field commanders and Cossack defectors from the Red Army. Hitler did not officially sanction the recruitment of Cossacks and lift the restrictions imposed on émigrés until the second year of the Nazi-Soviet conflict. During their brief occupation of the North Caucasus region, the Germans actively recruited Cossacks into detachments and local self-defense militias. The Germans even experimented with a self-governing district of Cossack communities in the Kuban region. When the Wehrmacht withdrew from the North Caucasus region in early 1943, tens of thousands of Cossacks retreated with them, either out of conviction or to avoid Soviet reprisals.

In 1943, the Germans formed the 1st Cossack Cavalry Division, under the command of General Helmuth von Pannwitz. While its ranks mostly comprised deserters from the Red Army, many of its officers and NCOs were Cossack émigrés who had received training at one of the cadet schools established by the White Army in Yugoslavia. The division was deployed to occupied Croatia to fight Tito's Partisans. There, its performance was generally effective, although at times brutal. In late 1944, the 1st Cossack Cavalry Division was admitted into the Waffen-SS, and enlarged into the XV SS Cossack Cavalry Corps.

In late 1943, the Reich Ministry for the Occupied Eastern Territories and Wehrmacht headquarters issued a joint proclamation promising the Cossacks independence once their homelands were "liberated" from the Red Army. The Germans followed this up by establishing the Cossack Central Administration, under the leadership of the former Don Cossack ataman, Pyotr Krasnov. Although it had many attributes of a government-in-exile, the Cossack Central Administration lacked any control over foreign policy or the deployment of Cossack troops in the Wehrmacht. In early 1945, Krasnov and his staff joined a group of 20,000–25,000 Cossack refugees and irregulars known as the Kazachi Stan. This group, then led by Sergei Pavlov (Cossack leader), had fled the North Caucasus alongside the Germans in 1943 and was moved between Kamianets-Podilskyi in Ukraine, Navahrudak in Belarus, and Tolmezzo, Italy.

In early May 1945, in the closing days of WWII, both the Kazachi Stan, now under Major General Timofei Domanov, and Pannwitz's XV SS Cossack Cavalry Corps retreated into Austria, where they surrendered to the British. At the end of the month, and in early June 1945, the majority of Cossacks from both groups were transferred to Red Army and SMERSH custody at the Soviet demarcation line in Judenburg, Austria. The repatriation of Cossacks after World War II resulted in sentences of hard labour or execution for the majority of the Cossacks collaborators. Vyacheslav Naumenko's two-volume work The Great Betrayal collected Cossack testimonials of the event.

==== Ukrainian Hetman movement ====
After his abdication on 14 December 1918, Ukrainian hetman Pavlo Skoropadskyi emigrated to Germany. From there he led the so-called Hetman movement (Ukrainian: Гетьманський рух), which consisted of a number of Ukrainian conservative monarchist organizations from different groups of Ukrainian diaspora. Most prominent of these organizations were the Ukrainian Union of Agrarians-Statists (Ukrainian: Український союз хліборобів-державників) founded in Vienna by Vyacheslav Lypynskyi and Serhiy Shemet, and the United Hetman Organization (Ukrainian: Союз гетьманців державників) active in Canada and the United States. In his "Letters to Brothers Agrarians", published in 1926, Lypynskyi elaborated the idea of an independent, classocratic, pan-Ukrainian "toilers' monarchy" without political parties, ruled by hetman and his dynasty with the help of an agrarian aristocracy and the co-operation of the productive classes. In Canada and the United States the Hetman movement emerged from the pre-WW1 Sich scouting societies and was implicitly supported by the Ukrainian Greek-Catholic Church. The movement supported the re-establishment of the Hetman state of Pavlo Skoropadskyi and devoted a lot of energy to military training of Ukrainian émigrés for the future liberation of their homeland, going as far as to acquire a number of airplanes. In 1940 the Canadian branch of the organization became one of the founders of the Ukrainian Canadian Congress. The North American Hetman movement reached the height of its influence around 1937–1938, when it was visited by Danylo Skoropadskyi, the hetman's son and successor. However, the organizations lost their influence during WW2 and in the following years due to internal splits and government investigations into their activity.

=== Modern times ===
Following the war, Cossack units, and the cavalry in general, were rendered obsolete and released from the Soviet Army. In the post-war years, many Cossack descendants were thought of as simple peasants, and those who lived in one of the autonomous republics usually gave way to the local minority and migrated elsewhere.

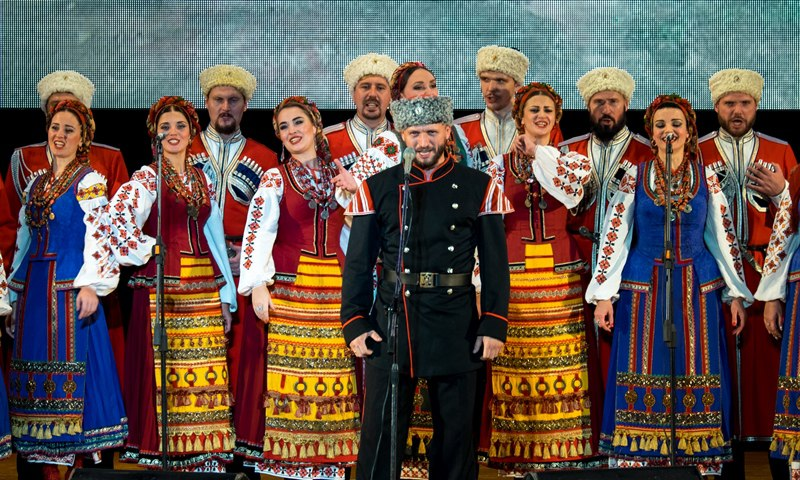
Kuban Cossack Choir in 2016

The principal Cossack émigré leader after 1945 was Nikolai Nazarenko, the self-proclaimed president of the World Federation of the Cossack National Liberation Movement of Cossackia, who enjoyed a prominence in New York as the organizer of the annual Captive Nations parade held every July. In 1978, Nazarenko dressed in his Don Cossack uniform led the Captive Days day parade in New York city, and told a journalist: "Cossackia is a nation of 10 million people. In 1923 the Russians officially abolished Cossackia as a nation. Officially, it no longer exists...America should not spend billions supporting the Soviets with trade. We don't have to be afraid of the Russian army because half of it is made up of Captive Nations. They can never trust the rank and file". The journalist Hal McKenzie described Nazarenko as having "cut a striking figure with his white fur cap, calf-length coat with long silver-sheathed dagger and ornamental silver cartridge cases on his chest". Nazarenko was also the president of Cossack American Republican National Federation, which in turn was part of the National Republican Heritage Groups Council, and he attracted much controversy in the 1980s owing to his wartime career and certain statements he made about Jews. The American journalist Christopher Simpson in his 1988 book Blowback: America's Recruitment of Nazis and Its Effects on the Cold War called Nazarenko a leading Republican activist who made "explicit pro-Nazi, anti-semitic" statements in his speeches.

During the Perestroika era of the Soviet Union of the late 1980s, many descendants of the Cossacks became enthusiastic about reviving their national traditions. In 1988, the Soviet Union passed a law allowing the reestablishment of former hosts and creation of new ones. The ataman of the largest, the Almighty Don Host, was granted Marshal rank and the right to form a new host. Simultaneously, many attempts were made to increase Cossack's impact on Russian society, and throughout the 1990s many regional authorities agreed to hand over some local administration and policing duties to the Cossacks.

According to the 2002 Russian Census, 140,028 people self-identified as ethnic Cossacks. Between 3.5 and 5 million people associate themselves with the Cossack identity in post-Soviet Russia and around the world.

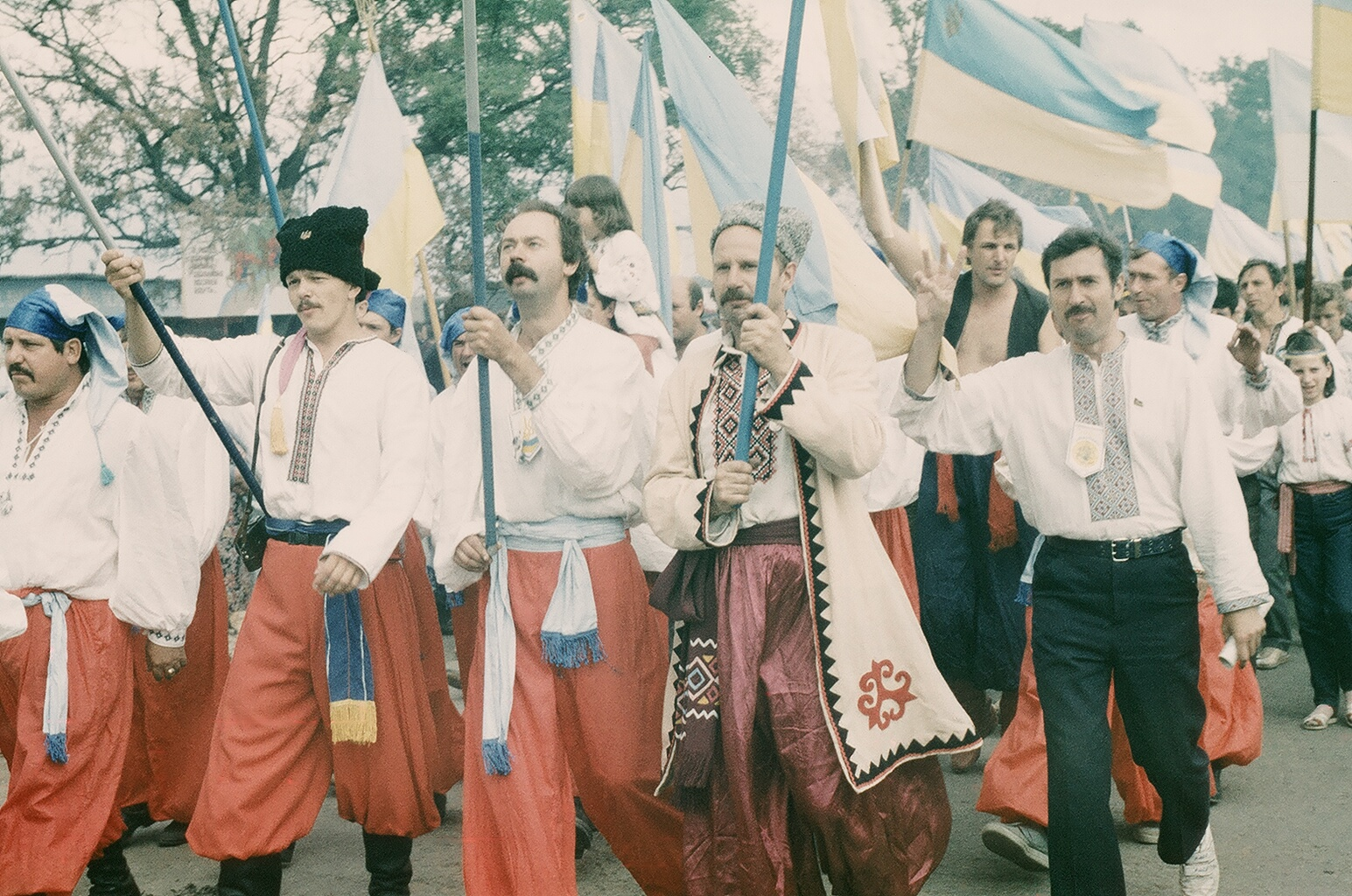
Ukrainians in Cossack dress during the celebrations of Zaporozhian Sich anniversary, in Zaporizhzhia, 1990

In Ukraine the national revival of late 1980s led to the appreciation of Cossack history and culture as symbols of the Ukrainian nation. Cossack symbols and songs were widely used in mass events and demonstrations, particularly during the celebration of the 500th anniversary of the Zaporozhian Sich in 1990. A number of Ukrainian Cossack organizations emerged during that time.

Cossacks have taken an active part in many of the conflicts that have taken place since the disintegration of the Soviet Union. These include the War of Transnistria, Georgian–Abkhazian conflict, Georgian–Ossetian conflict, First Nagorno-Karabakh War, 2016 Nagorno-Karabakh war, First Chechen War, Second Chechen War, and the 2014 pro-Russian unrest in Ukraine and both the subsequent War in Donbas and the 2022 Russian invasion of Ukraine.

== Culture and organization ==
In early times, an ataman (later called hetman) commanded a Cossack band. He was elected by the Host members at a Cossack rada, as were the other important officials: the judge, the scribe, the lesser officials, and the clergy. The ataman's symbol of power was a ceremonial mace, a bulava. Today, Russian Cossacks are led by atamans, and Ukrainian Cossacks by hetmans.

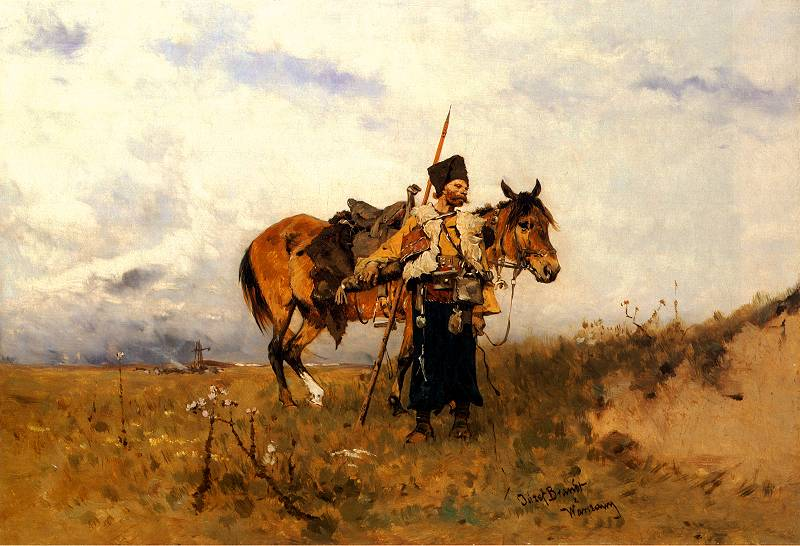
Cossack on duty (portrayal of 16th–17th century), painting by Józef Brandt

After the Polish–Russian Treaty of Andrusovo split Ukraine along the Dnieper River in 1667, Ukrainian Cossacks were known as Left-bank and Right-bank Cossacks. The ataman had executive powers, and in wartime was the supreme commander in the field. Legislative power was given to the Band Assembly (Rada). The senior officers were called starshyna. In the absence of written laws, the Cossacks were governed by the "Cossack Traditions" – the common, unwritten law.

Cossack society and government were heavily militarized. The nation was called a host (vois'ko, or viys'ko, translated as "army"). The people and territories were subdivided into regimental and company districts, and village posts (polky, sotni, and stanytsi). A unit of a Cossack troop could be called a Kurin. Each Cossack settlement, alone or in conjunction with neighboring settlements, formed military units and regiments of light cavalry or, in the case of Siberian Cossacks, mounted infantry. They could respond to a threat on very short notice.

A high regard for education was a tradition among the Cossacks of Ukraine. In 1654, when Macarius III Ibn al-Za'im, the Patriarch of Antioch, traveled to Moscow through Ukraine, his son, Deacon Paul Allepscius, wrote the following report:

All over the land of Rus', i.e., among the Cossacks, we have noticed a remarkable feature which made us marvel; all of them, with the exception of only a few among them, even the majority of their wives and daughters, can read and know the order of the church-services as well as the church melodies. Besides that, their priests take care and educate the orphans, not allowing them to wander in the streets ignorant and unattended.

=== Groupings ===
Russian Cossacks are divided into two broad groups: the Stepnoy (Ru:Степной), those of the Steppes, and the Kavkas (Ru:Кавкас), those of the Caucasus. In 1917 the Caucasians were divided into two hosts, the Kuban and the Terek; while the Steppe were divided into 8 hosts, the Don (the largest), Siberia, Orenburg, Astrakhan, Trans-Baikal, Semiretchi, Amur, and Ussurki voiskos.

=== Settlements ===
Russian Cossacks founded numerous settlements (stanitsas) and fortresses along troublesome borders. These included the forts Verny (Almaty, Kazakhstan) in south Central Asia; Grozny in North Caucasus; Fort Alexandrovsk (Fort Shevchenko, Kazakhstan); Krasnovodsk (Turkmenbashi, Turkmenistan); Novonikolayevskaya stanitsa (Bautino, Kazakhstan); Blagoveshchensk; and towns and settlements along the Ural, Ishim, Irtysh, Ob, Yenisei, Lena, Amur, Anadyr (Chukotka), and Ussuri Rivers. A group of Albazin Cossacks settled in China as early as 1685.

Cossacks interacted with nearby peoples and exchanged cultural influences (the Terek Cossacks, for example, were heavily influenced by the culture of North Caucasian tribes). They also frequently intermarried with local non-Cossack settlers and local inhabitants, regardless of race or origin, sometimes setting aside religious restrictions. (Note: "Сопредельные с ними (поселенцами – Ред.) по 'Горькой линии' казаки ... поголовно обучались Киргизскому наречию и переняли некоторые, впрочем, безвредные привычки кочевого народа." "Among [settlers nearby] the 'Gor'kaya Liniya' Cossacks ... everyone learnt Kyrgys' language and adopted some customs, though harmless, of the nomadic people.") War brides brought from distant lands were also common in Cossack families. General Bogaevsky, a commander in the Russian Volunteer Army, mentions in his 1918 memoir that one of his Cossacks, Sotnik Khoperski, was a native Chinese who had been brought back as a child from Manchuria during the Russian-Japanese War of 1904–1905 and adopted and raised by a Cossack family.

Cossacks initially relied on raiding, herding, fishing and hunting, despising agriculture as lowly. After the defeat of Stenka Razin in 1672, the Cossacks began transitioning to agriculture, but this would remain a secondary concern for Cossacks until the late 19th century.

=== Family life ===
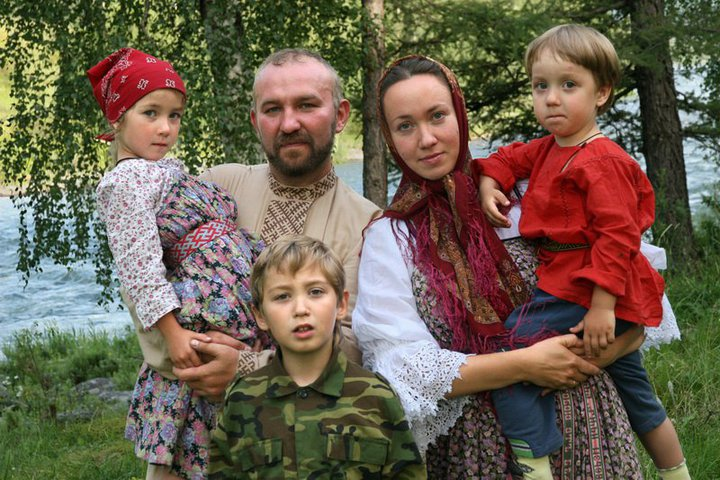
Siberian Cossack family in Novosibirsk, after 2000

Historically, when Cossack men fought in permanent wars far from home, women took over the role of family leaders. Women were also called upon to physically defend their villages and towns from enemy attacks. In some cases, they raided and disarmed neighboring villages composed of other ethnic groups. Leo Tolstoy described such Cossack female chauvinism in his novel, The Cossacks. Relations between the sexes within the stanitsas were relatively egalitarian. The American historian Thomas Barrett wrote "The history of Cossack women complicates general notions of patriarchy within Russian society".

When the Malorossian Cossack regiments were disbanded, those Cossacks who were not promoted to nobility, or did not join other estates, were united into a civil Cossack estate. Sergei Korolev's mother was the daughter of a leader of the civil estate of the Zaporozhian Sich.

=== Popular image ===
Portrait of a Cossack woman by Ukrainian artist Serhii Vasylkivsky

Cossacks have long appealed to romantics as idealizing freedom and resistance to external authority, and their military exploits against their enemies have contributed to this favorable image. For others, Cossacks are a symbol of repression, for their role in suppressing popular uprisings in the Russian Empire, during the Khmelnytsky Uprising of 1648–1657, and in pogroms, including those perpetrated by the Terek Cossacks during the Russian revolution and by various Cossack atamans in Ukraine in 1919, among them atamans Zeleny, Hryhoriv, and Semosenko.

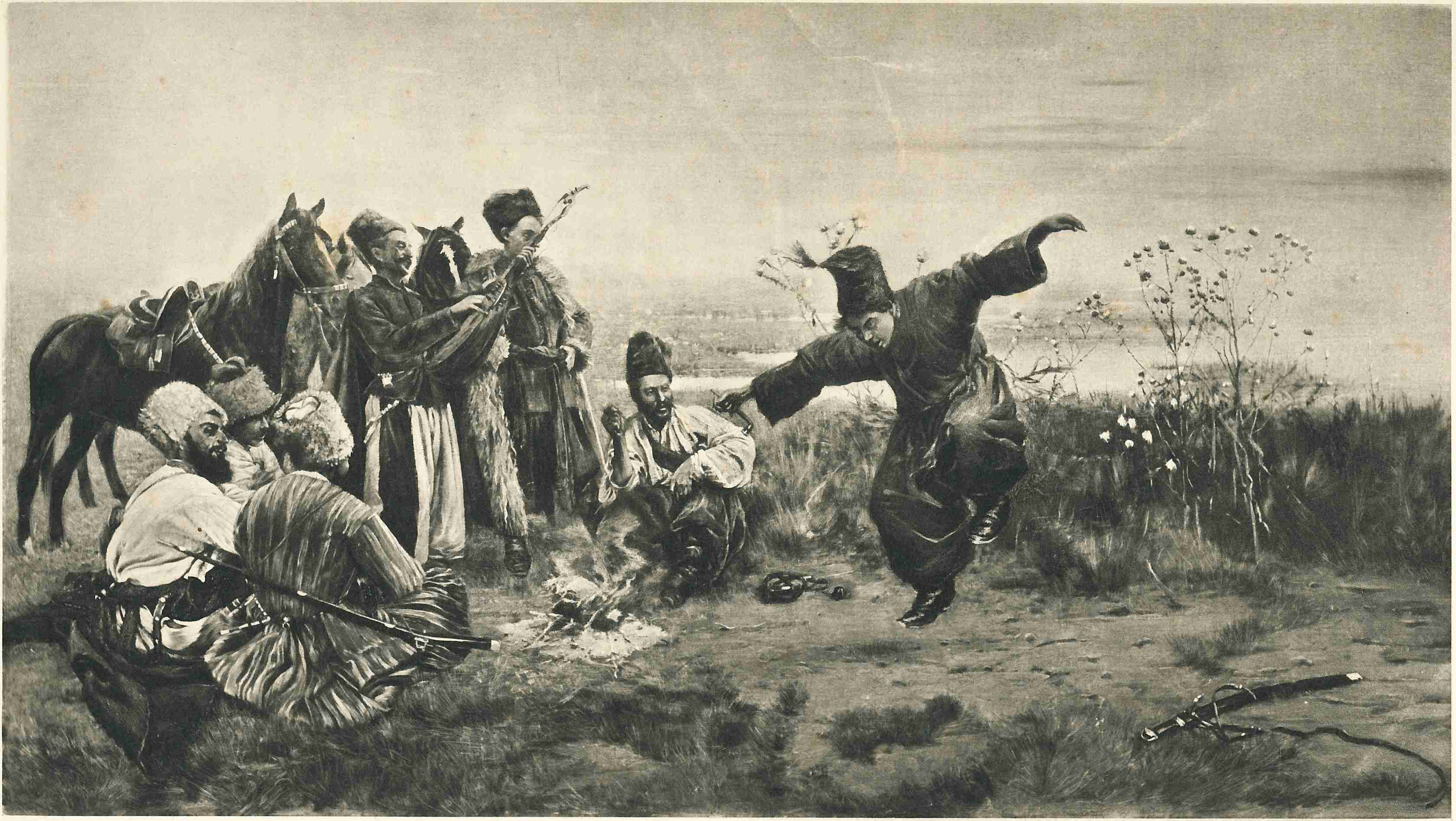
Cossacks Dance – Kozachok by Stanisław Masłowski, oil on canvas 1883

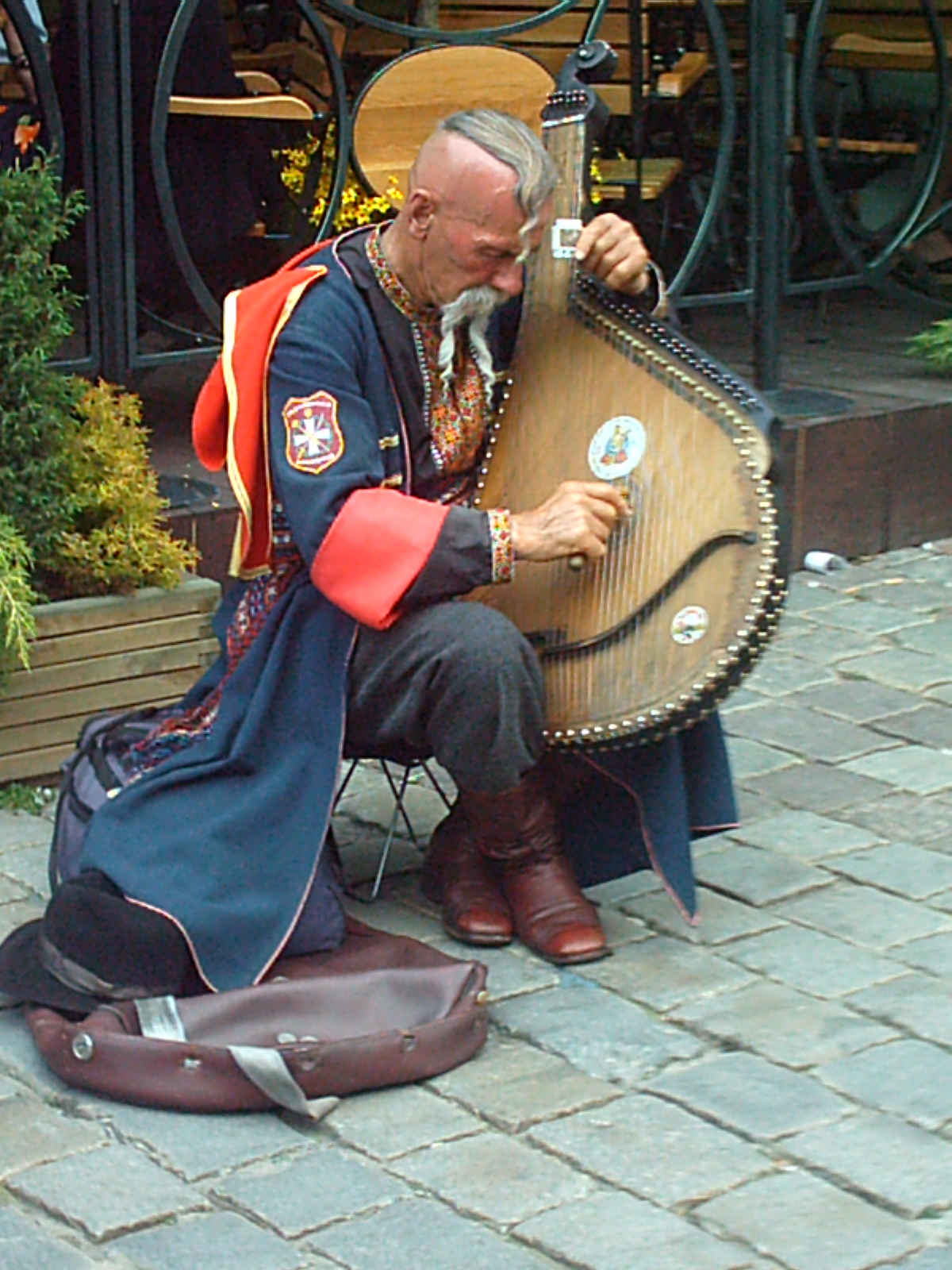
Ostap Kindrachuk, Ukrainian Cossack, playing the bandura in traditional dress

Literary reflections of Cossack culture abound in Russian, Ukrainian, and Polish literature, particularly in the works of Nikolai Gogol (Taras Bulba), Taras Shevchenko, Mikhail Sholokhov (And Quiet Flows the Don), Henryk Sienkiewicz (With Fire and Sword). One of Leo Tolstoy's first novellas, The Cossacks, depicts their autonomy and estrangement from Moscow and from centralized rule. Many of Isaac Babel's stories (for instance, those in Red Cavalry) depict Cossack soldiers, and were based on Babel's experiences as a war correspondent attached to the 1st Cavalry Army.

Polish Romantic literature also commonly dealt with Cossack themes. Some of the Polish writers of this period (for instance, Michał Czajkowski and Józef Bohdan Zaleski) were known as "Cossacophiles" who wholeheartedly celebrated the Cossack history and lifestyle in their works. Others, such as Henryk Rzewuski and Michał Grabowski, were more critical in their approach.

In the literature of Western Europe, Cossacks appear in Byron's poem "Mazeppa", Tennyson's "The Charge of the Light Brigade", and Richard Connell's short story "The Most Dangerous Game". In many stories by adventure writer Harold Lamb, the main character is a Cossack.

During the Imperial period, Cossacks acquired an image as the ferocious defenders of the antisemitic Russian state. Still, during the Soviet era, Jews were encouraged to admire Cossacks as the antitheses of the "parasitic" and "feeble dwellers of the shtetl." A number of Yiddish writers, including Khaim Melamud, Shmuel Gordon, Viktor Fink, and Shmuel Godiner, presented fictionalized accounts of peaceful Jewish-Cossack coexistence, while efforts were made by the pro-Soviet press to present Khmelnytsky as a heroic figure and Cossacks as liberators from the Nazis.

Historiography interprets Cossackdom in imperial and colonial terms. In Ukraine, where Cossackdom represents historical and cultural heritage, some people have begun attempting to recreate the images of Ukrainian Cossacks. Traditional Ukrainian culture is often tied in with the Cossacks, and the Ukrainian government actively supports these attempts. The traditional Cossack bulava serves as a symbol of the Ukrainian presidency, and the island of Khortytsia, the origin and center of the Zaporozhian Sich, has been restored. The video game Cossacks: European Wars is a Ukrainian-made game series influenced by Cossack culture.

Cossacks are also mentioned outside Europe. The Japanese anime The Doraemons, part of the larger Doraemon anime series, has a Cossack character, Dora-nichov, who is from Russia.

=== Music ===
The official military march of Russian Cossacks units is Cossacks in Berlin, composed by Dmitry Pokrass and Daniil Pokrass, with lyrics being made by Caesar Solodar. Solodar was present when Field Marshal Wilhelm Keitel signed the act of surrender to Allied forces. That same day, he left for Moscow and by the evening of 9 May, the song was written. The lyrics detail an interaction between a Cossack and a girl from Berlin.

The S. Tvorun arrangement of the Zaporizhian March (known as the Cossack march) is one of the main marches of the Armed Forces of Ukraine, replacing Farewell of Slavianka in 1991 as the official sendoff music for army recruits. The Kuban Cossack Choir is a leading folkloric ensemble that reflects the dances and folklore of the Kuban Cossack.

The second movement of Mily Balakirev's Second Symphony is marked "Scherzo alla Cosacca", which means "scherzo in the style of the Cossacks".

=== Ranks ===
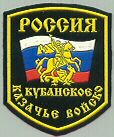
Modern Kuban Cossack armed forces patch of the Russian military

The Russian Empire organized its Cossacks into several voiskos (hosts), which lived along the Russian border and internal borders between Russian and non-Russian peoples. Each host originally had its own leadership, ranks, regalia, and uniforms. By the late 19th century, ranks were standardized following the example of the Imperial Russian Army. The ranks and insignia were kept after the 1988 law allowing the hosts to reform, and the 2005 law legally recognizing the hosts as a combat service. They are given below as per all military tickets that are standard for the Russian Army.

Modern Cossack rank	Equivalent modern Russian Army	Equivalent foreign rank
Kazak	Ryadovoy	Private
Prikazny	Yefreitor	Lance Corporal
Mladshy Uryadnik	Mladshy Serzhant	Corporal
Uryadnik	Serzhant	Sergeant
Starshy Uryadnik	Starshy Serzhant	Senior Sergeant
Mladshy Vakhmistr		Junior Warrant Officer
Vakhmistr	Praporshchik	Warrant Officer
Starshy Vakhmistr	Starshy Praporshchik	Senior Warrant Officer
Podkhorunzhy	Mládshiy Leytenánt	Junior Lieutenant
Khorunzhy	Leytenant	Lieutenant
Sotnik	Starshy Leytenant	Senior Lieutenant
Podyesaul	Kapitan	Captain
Yesaul	Mayor	Major
Voiskovy Starshyna	Podpolkovnik	Lieutenant-Colonel
Kazachy Polkovnik	Polkovnik	Colonel
Kazachy General*	General	General
Ataman		Commander

*Rank presently absent in the Russian Army
*The application of the ranks Polkovnik and General is only stable for small hosts. Large hosts are divided into divisions, and consequently the Russian Army sub-ranks General-mayor, General-leytenant and General-polkovnik are used to distinguish the atamans' hierarchy of command, the supreme ataman having the highest rank available. In this case, the shoulder insignia has a dedicated one-, two- and three-star alignment, as is normal in the Russian Army. Otherwise, it will be blank.

As with the ranks Polkovnik and General, the Colonel ranks are only stable for small hosts, being given to atamans of regional and district status. The smallest unit, the stanitsa, is commanded by a Yesaul. If the region or district lacks any other stanitsas, the rank Polkovnik is applied automatically, but with no stars on the shoulder. As the hosts continue to grow, starless shoulder patches are becoming increasingly rare.

In addition, the supreme ataman of the largest Don Cossack Host is officially titled Marshal, and so wears insignia derived from the Russian/Soviet Marshal ranks, including the diamond Marshal Star. This is because the Don Cossack Supreme Ataman is recognized as the official head of all Cossack armies, including those outside the present Russian borders. He also has the authority to recognize and dissolve new hosts.

=== Uniforms ===
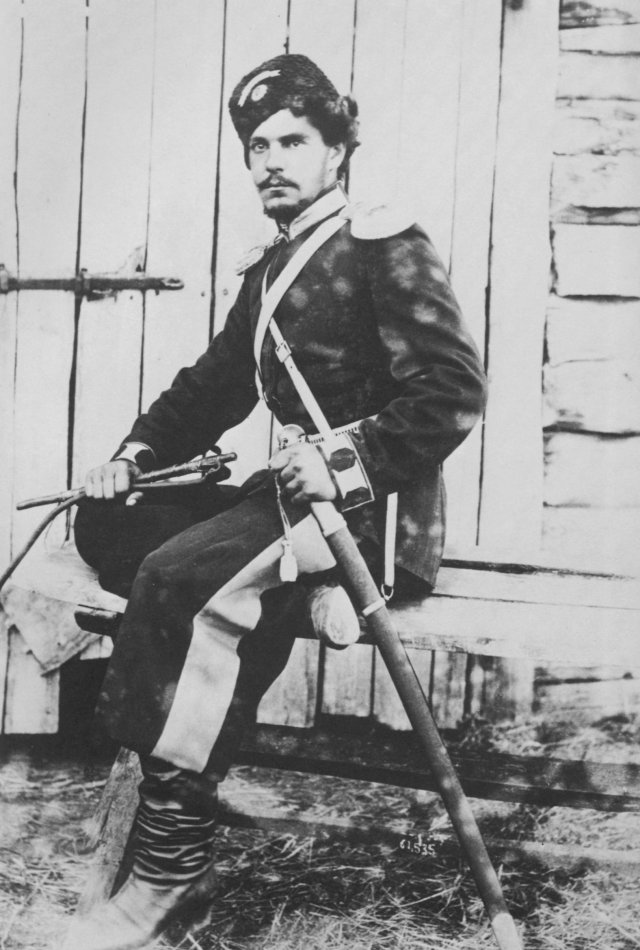
Cossack officer from Orenburg, with shashka, early 1900s

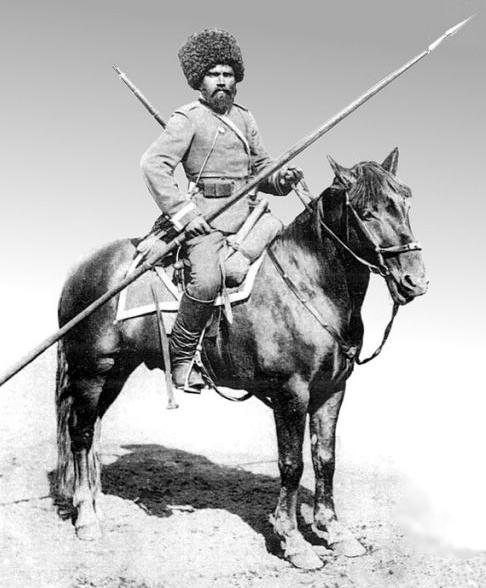
Siberian Cossack c. 1890s

Cossacks were expected to provide their own uniforms. While these were sometimes manufactured in bulk by factories owned by the individual host, families often handed down garments or made them within the household. Accordingly, individual items might vary from those laid down by regulation, or be of obsolete pattern. Each host had distinctive uniform colourings. Similar uniforms are in service today amongst the Cossacks of Russia.

For most hosts, the basic uniform consisted of the standard loose-fitting tunics and wide trousers typical of Russian regular troops from 1881 to 1908, and shown in the two photographs opposite. In marked contrast the two Caucasian hosts (Kuban and Terek) wore the very long, open-fronted, cherkesska coats with ornamental cartridge loops and coloured beshmets (waistcoats). These have come to epitomize the popular image of the Cossacks. Most hosts wore fleece hats with coloured cloth tops in full dress, and round caps with or without peaks for ordinary duties. These caps were worn sharply slanted to one side by the rank-and-file of Cossack regiments, over hair trimmed longer than that of ordinary Russian soldiers. The two Caucasian hosts wore high fleece caps on most occasions, together with black felt cloaks (burke) in bad weather.

Until 1909, Cossack regiments in summer wore white gymnasterkas (blouses) and cap covers of standard Russian army pattern. The shoulder straps and cap bands were in the host colour, as detailed below. From 1910 to 1918, they wore a khaki-grey jacket for field wear. The dress uniform had blue or green breeches with broad, coloured stripes in the host colour, which were often worn with the service jacket.

While most Cossacks served as cavalry, several of the larger hosts had infantry and artillery units. Three regiments of Cossacks formed part of the Imperial Guard, as well as the Konvoi—the tsar's mounted escort. The Imperial Guard regiments wore tailored, government-issue uniforms, which were colourful and elaborate. For example, the Konvoi wore scarlet cherkesskas, white beshmets, and red crowns on their fleece hats. The Guard Cossacks of His Majesty and the Ataman's Guard Cossacks, both drawn from the Don Host, wore red, and light blue, coats respectively. The Combined Cossack Guard Regiment, comprising representative detachments from each of the remaining hosts, wore red, light blue, crimson, or orange coats, according to squadron.

Host	Year est.	Cherkesska (long coat) or tunic	Beshmet (waistcoat)	Trousers	Fleece Hat	Shoulder Straps
Don Cossacks	1570	blue tunic	none	blue with red stripes	red crown	blue
Ural Cossacks	1571	blue tunic	none	blue with crimson stripes	crimson crown	crimson
Terek Cossacks	1577	grey-brown cherkesska	light blue	grey	light blue crown	light blue
Kuban Cossacks	1864	black cherkesska	red	grey	red crown	red
Orenburg Cossacks	1744	green tunic	none	green with light blue stripes	light blue crown	light blue
Astrakhan Cossacks	1750	blue tunic	none	blue with yellow stripes	yellow crown	yellow
Siberian Cossacks	1750s	green tunic	none	green with red stripes	red crown	red
Transbaikal Cossacks	1851	green tunic	none	green with yellow stripes	yellow crown	yellow
Amur Cossacks	1858	green tunic	none	green with yellow stripes	yellow crown	green
Semiryechensk Cossacks	1867	green tunic	none	green with crimson stripes	crimson crown	crimson
Ussuri Cossacks	1889	green tunic	none	green with yellow stripes	yellow crown	yellow
Source: All details are based on the 1909–1914 dress uniforms portrayed in coloured plates published by the Imperial War Ministry (Shenk 1910–1911).

== Modern-day Cossack identity ==
Ethnic, or "born" (prirodnye), Cossacks are those who can trace, or claim to trace, their ancestry to people and families identified as Cossack in the Tsarist era. They tend to be Christian, practicing as Orthodox Christians or Old Believers; though there are growing numbers of Rodnovers, especially among Ukrainian Cossacks.

Others may be initiated as Cossacks, particularly men in military service. Such initiates may be neither ethnic Slavs, nor Christian. Not all agree that such initiates should be considered Cossack. There is no consensus on an initiation rite or rules.

In other cases, individuals may wear Cossack uniform and pass themselves off as Cossack, perhaps because there is a large ethnic Cossack population in the area and the person wants to fit in. Others adopt Cossack clothing in an attempt to take on some of their mythic status. Ethnic Cossacks refer to the re-enactors as ryazhenye (ряженые, or "dressed up phonies").

Because of the lack of consensus on how to define Cossacks, accurate numbers are not available. According to the Russian Census of 2010, 67,573 people identify as ethnic Cossack in Russia. Between 3.5 and 5 million people associate themselves with the Cossack identity in Europe and across the world.

== Organizations ==
=== Americas ===
The Cossack Congress in America unites the Cossack communities of the North American Continent. It has branches in the U.S., Canada, and Colombia.

=== Armenia ===
On April 24, 1999, the founding meeting of the International Armenian-Cossack Friendship and Cooperation Association was held in Yerevan. There is a Separate Cossack District of the Great Don Army operating in Armenia. The organization was established by the decision of the Council of Atamans on December 15, 2015. It is a partner of the Ministry of Defense of Armenia.

=== Azerbaijan ===
The Association of Cossacks of Azerbaijan operates in the Republic of Azerbaijan. The association was established in 1992 and registered with the Ministry of Justice of Azerbaijan on 16 November 1994, with 1,500 members. Many Cossacks under the association join the Azerbaijani Armed Forces.

=== Belarus ===
There are 3 republican Cossack organizations in Belarus: the All-Belarusian United Cossacks, the All-Belarusian Unified Cossacks and the Belarusian Cossacks, which have existed since the mid-1990s.

=== Russia ===
==== Registered Cossacks of the Russian Federation ====
The Registered Cossacks of the Russian Federation are the Cossack paramilitary formation providing public and other services, under the Federal Law of the Russian Federation dated December 5, 2005, No. 154-FZ "On State Service of the Russian Cossacks".

==== All-Russian Cossack Society ====
The All-Russian Cossack Society (Russian: Всероссийское казачье общество) is responsible for the coordination of the activities of all 11 registered Cossack hosts, particularly in the spheres of patriotic education and the continuity of historical Cossack customs and traditions. Both registered and non-registered Cossack organizations can be part of the society. On 4 November 2019, Russian President Vladimir Putin appointed Kuban Vice Governor and Kuban Cossack Host Ataman Nikolai Doluda as Ataman of the All-Russia Cossack Society. Cossack General Doluda was appointed two years after the atamans and the Cossacks created it in October 2017. The idea was first proposed in 1994. On 27 November 2018, delegates of the Constitutive Assembly voted for the establishment of the society and adopted its official statute. Doluda was then nominated for head of the society, in which he was backed by the Presidential Council on Cossack Affairs.

=== Ukraine ===
The following organizations operate in Ukraine:

- Great Council of Atamans of Ukraine
- United Council of Ukrainian and Foreign Cossacks
- Cossack Guard of Ukraine
- Ukrainian Registered Cossacks
- International Union of Cossacks
- Registered Ukrainian People's Cossacks
- All-Ukrainian Cossack Army
- Union of Cossack Formations

== Notable people ==
- Category:People from the Cossack Hetmanate
- Category:Don Cossacks
- Category:Kuban Cossacks
- Category:People from the Russian Empire of Zaporozhian Cossack descent

== Noble families ==
=== Zaporozhian Cossacks ===
- Doroshenko family
- Khanenko family
- Kobyzewicz family
- Lyzohub family
- Mazepa family
- Paskevich
- Poltoratsky family
- Razumovsky
- Skoropadsky family
- Tereshchenko family

=== Other groups ===
- List of Don Cossacks noble families
- Shivtzov family (Orenburg) of Orenburg Cossacks

== Flags and emblems ==
Flag of the Don Cossacks

Flag of the Kuban Cossacks

Flag of the Semirechye Cossacks

Flag of the Terek Cossacks

Flag of Russian Sloboda-Ukrainian Cossacks

Flag of the Orenburg Cossacks

Unofficial flag of Cossackia

Flag of the Free Cossack Detachment of the Russian Volunteer Corps

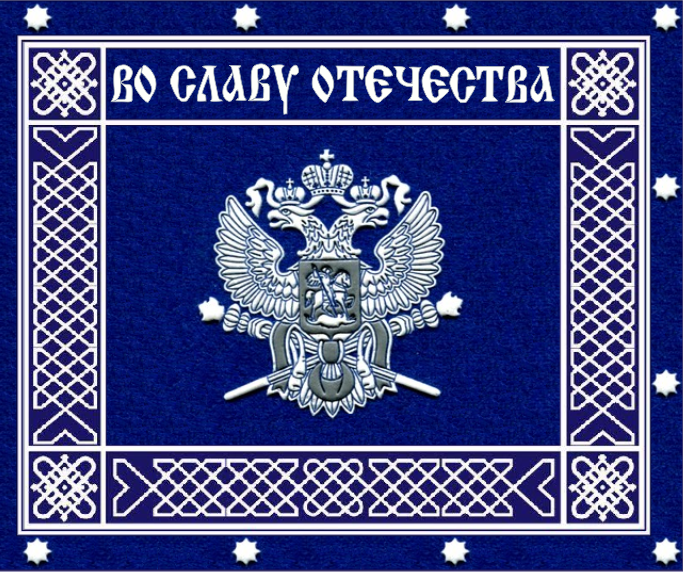
Flag of the Registered Cossacks of The Russian Federation

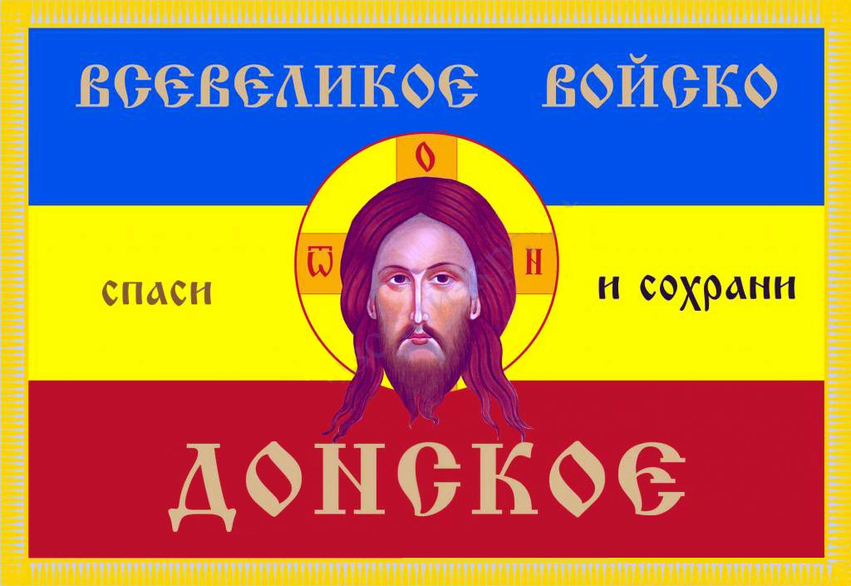
Flag of the Cossack National Guard

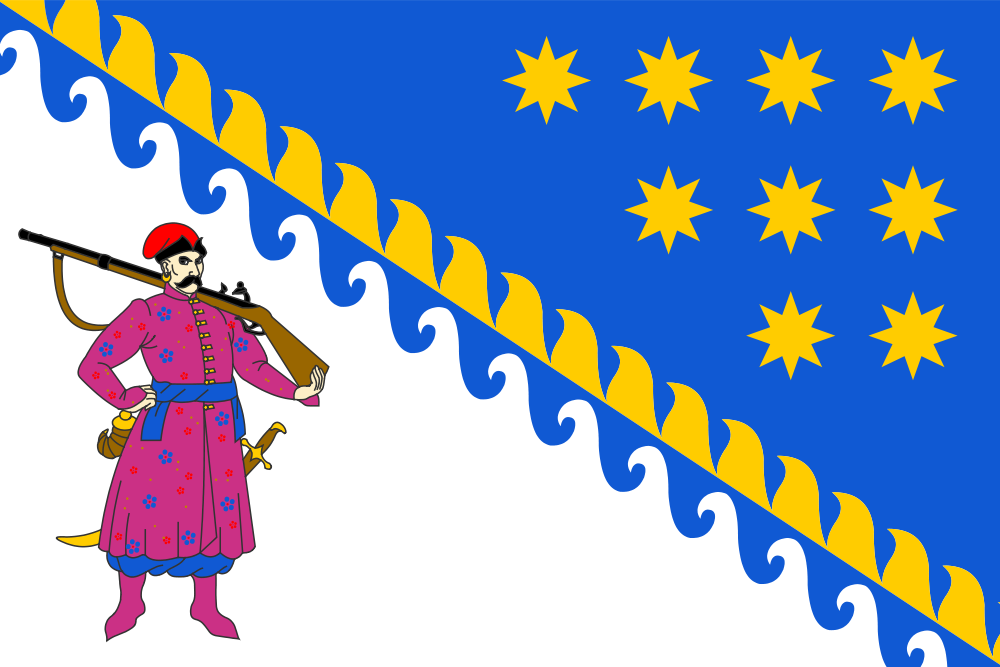
Flag of Dnipropetrovsk Oblast

Flag of Zaporizhzhia Oblast
Emblem of the Registered Cossacks of the Russian Federation

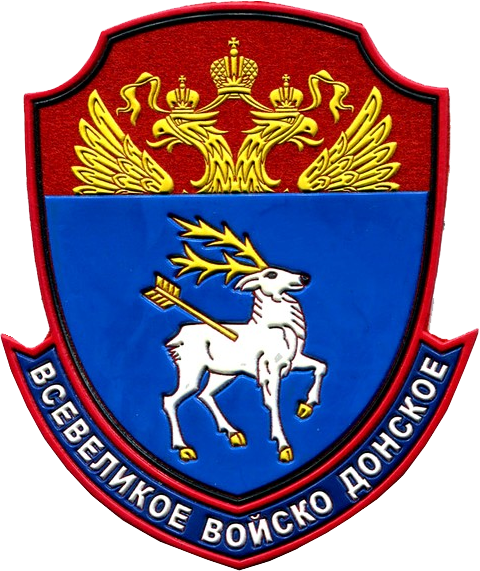
Emblem of registered Don cossacks

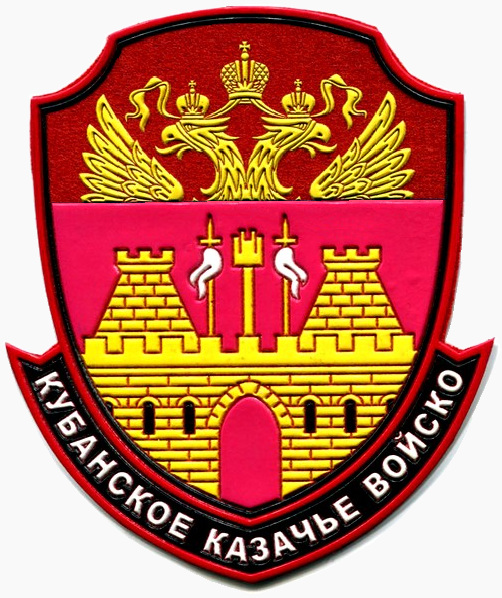
Emblem of registered Kuban cossacks

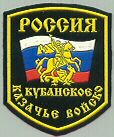
Modern Kuban Cossack armed forces patch of the Russian military

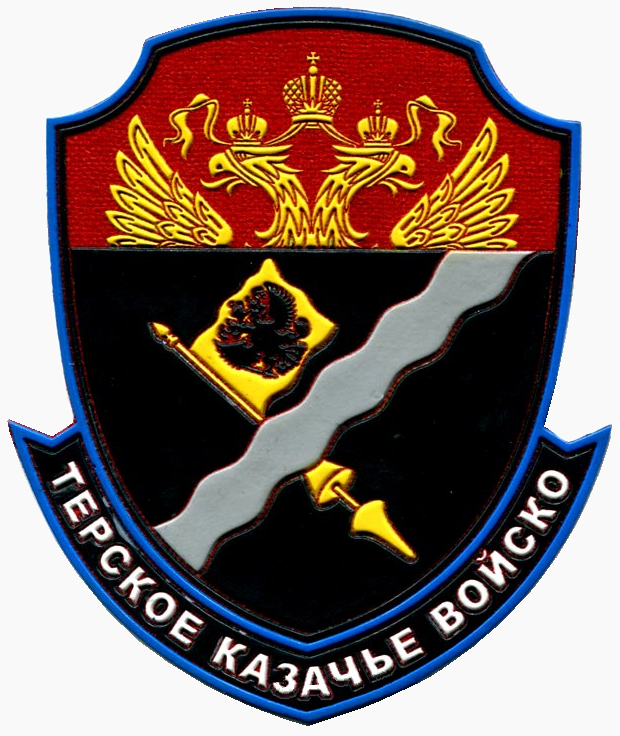
Emblem of registered Terek cossacks

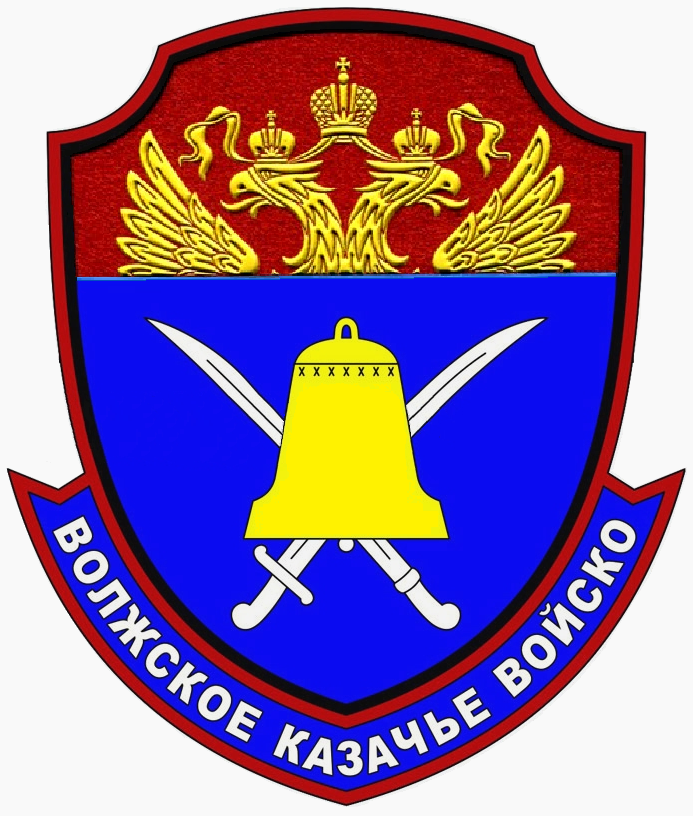
Emblem of registered Volga cossacks

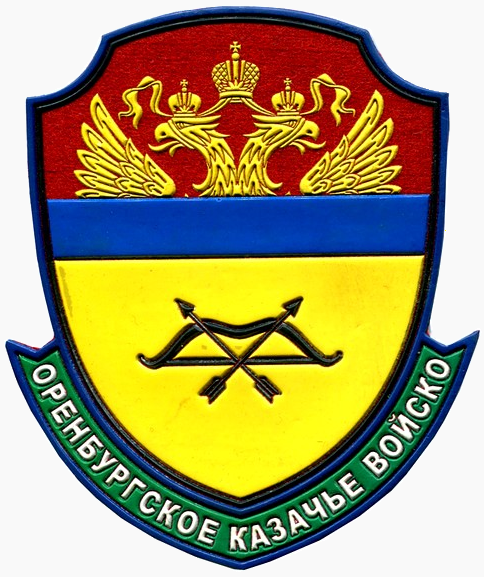
Emblem of the registered Orenburg Cossacks

Coat of arms of the Zaporozhian Host

== Propaganda and stereotypes ==
The propaganda machine of Napoleon, a French military and political leader, spread the myth of Scottish Cossacks. French propaganda portrayed the inhabitants of the Scottish Highlands as barbarian with non-human bodily functions, who allegedly felt great joy when destroying civilian housing, farmland, and even entire human settlements. This stereotype of Scottish people was later mingled with observations on Russian soldiers fighting on the European continent. In Europe Cossack is a titulation for a thief, while Russians have been stereotyped by French authors as exotic.

== See also ==
- Albazinians
- Combat Hopak
- Cossacks cuisine
- Cossack election
- Cossack explorers
- Cossack host
- Cossacks (film series)
- Crimean Khanate
- Hetmans of Ukrainian Cossacks
- History of the Cossacks
- Hopak
- Kosiński Uprising
- Persian Cossack Brigade
- Prisiadki - a type of dance associated with Cossacks
- Registered Cossacks
- Registered Cossacks of the Russian Federation
- Tatar Cossacks
- Tatar invasions
- Wild Fields
