= Uniforms of the Russian Armed Forces =

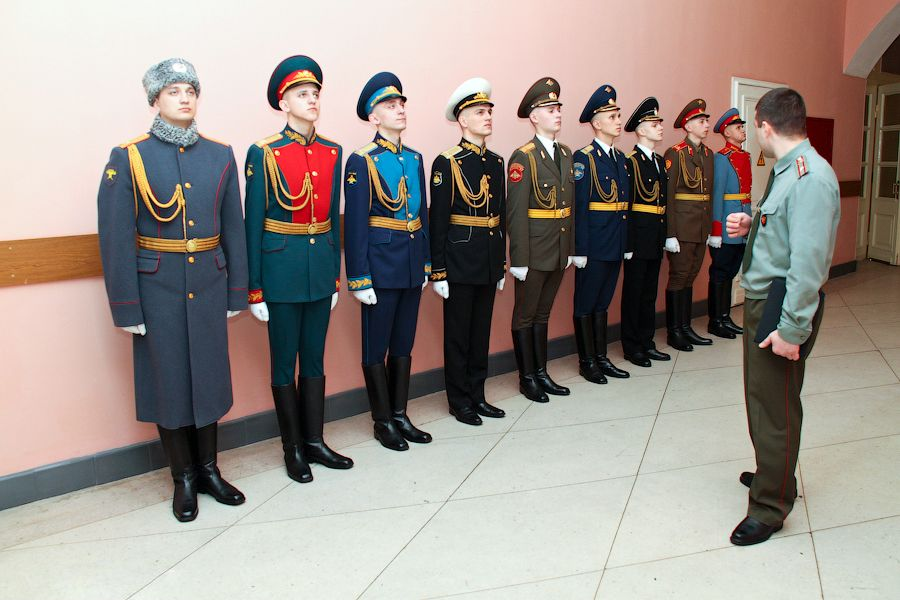
Ceremonial honour guard uniforms. From left to right: Winter Army, Army, Air Force, Navy, 1994-2008 Army, 1994-2008 Air Force, 1994-2008 Navy, 1971-1994 Army, 1955-1971 Army

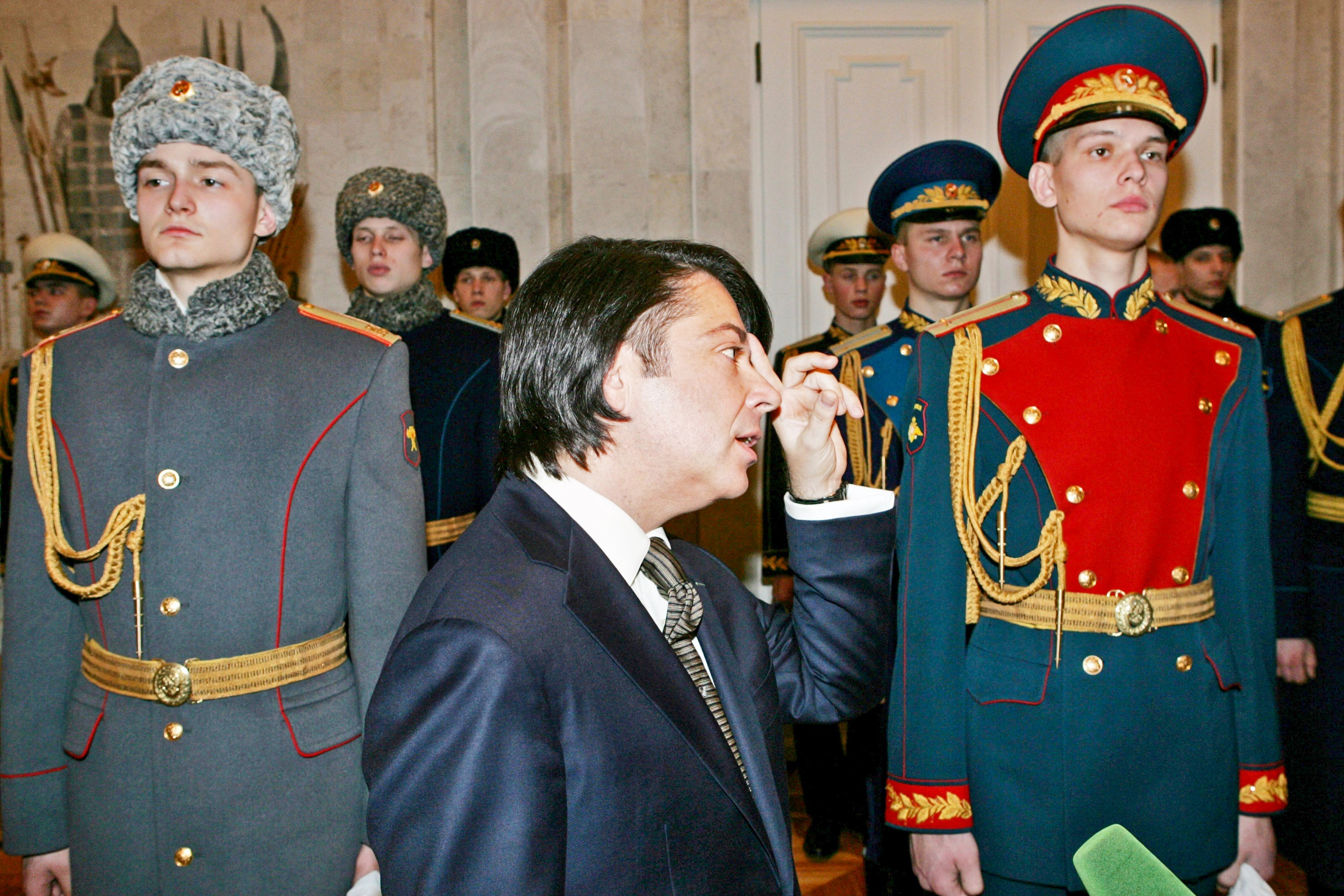
Fashion designer Valentin Yudashkin at an inspection by the President of the new Russian Armed Forces uniforms, January 2008

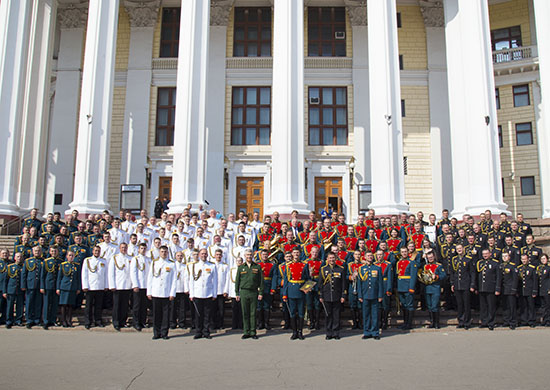
The bands of the Western Military District in their various uniforms

The extensive system of uniforms of the Russian Armed Forces was inherited from the Soviet Armed Forces and modified across the years.

Traditionally, the military uniforms of the Russian Armed Forces have been subdivided into parade, service dress, and field uniform roles, each with summer and winter variations, largely based on rank, season, and gender differences.

== Governance ==
The specific items, rules, regulations, and duties of the uniforms which are used in the Armed Forces of the Russian Federation are determined by Ministry of Defence and ultimately by the Minister of Defence. The current effective order which governs this is:

- Order of the RF Ministry of Defence No. 525 of October 9, 2020

Which replaced the following previous orders (in effect from 2015 to 2020):

- Order of the RF Ministry of Defence No. 300 of June 22, 2015 (for military personnel)
- Order of the RF Ministry of Defence No. 340 of June 27, 2019 (for military personnel of the Navy)
- Order of the RF Ministry of Defence No. 725 of November 8, 2016 (for civil servants of the Ministry of Defence)

The wearing of uniforms is subject to regulations applying not only to those serving in the Armed Forces, but also to pupils of the Suvorov military and Nakhimov naval academies, members of the reserve who have been discharged from active service, and ex-servicemen and women who still have the right to wear a military uniform.

== Design overview ==
In terms of their design, the uniforms currently worn by the Russian Federation Armed Forces' servicemen are, to a greater or lesser degree, a development of those worn by the Armed Forces of the former Soviet Union and in turn the Russian Empire.

Uniforms tend be most distinguishable by branch of service, largely due to colour differences. Other noteworthy subdivisions are based on rank, season, gender, and role. Independent troops use the uniforms from one of these three services with varying modifications, with the Strategic Rocket Forces using Army uniforms and the Airborne Forces using Aerospace Forces uniforms. The customary basic colours of black, green, and blue as worn by those serving in, respectively, the Russian Navy, Russian Army, and Russian Aerospace Forces reflect those traditionally worn in earlier periods.

In terms of division by rank, major distinctions tend to emerge between generals, officers, and enlisted personnel. It is worth noting that warrant officers are categorised with other officers rather than enlisted personnel with regards to uniforms. Variations of uniforms by rank have changed throughout history. Current prominent current distinctions include the type of uniforms, with only generals and officers receiving parade and service dress uniforms, ceremonial insignia, and ceremonial accoutrements. A noteworthy exception to this general rule is in military bandsmen who receive parade uniforms and use the ceremonial insignia and accoutrements of officers during solemn occasions.

There are a number of distinctive uniform designs today that were used in both the Soviet Union and the Russian Empire. For example, belts, aiguillettes, and shoulder straps of ceremonial detachments and honour guard units in solemn occasions, such as parades, state and military holidays, meetings of heads of state, meeting of government delegations, usage in solemn ceremonies, and usage in military honours ceremonies tend to reflect previous periods. Additionally, the army and aerospace cockade acts as a synthesis of that from both periods, with a five-pointed gold star on top of orange and black ovals, and surrounded by dihedral ray edging and occasionally a wreath. The five-pointed star became a Russian military symbol as a result of its importation from socialist heraldry during the Red Army period. The black and orange ovals are directly an importation of the Russian Empire's cockade. The rays are from the Soviet cockade, however, were occasionally part of Imperial uniforms. Finally, the ceremonial wreathing of the cockade is a direct inclusion from Soviet tradition.

=== Navy ===
Similar to most navies, the Russian Navy has a separate set of dress uniforms for different seasons. The dominant colours are navy blue (used, for example, in the sailor suit and naval working dress suit), white (used during summer) or black (used by officers in normal dress and other ranks in the office uniform). Worn under the sailor suit for enlisted personnel is traditionally the telnyashka.

Naval infantry have uniforms elements that differ from the rest of the navy. For example, their only uniform colour is black. Additionally, officers have a different style service dress uniform which is reminiscent of the Soviet period uniform, personnel of all ranks often wear telnyashka instead of just enlisted personnel, and they have black berets with a red flag and anchor (in a similar pattern to the flag of the Soviet Union).

=== Ground Forces and Strategic Rocket Forces ===
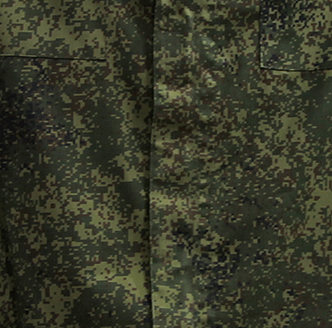
EMR camouflage on the battle uniform

Similar to other armies, the Russian Ground Forces makes use of a number of colours for its uniforms depending on the degree of formality. The role of each colour has changed considerably during different times. For a brief view, current colours used commonly include aqua (often dubbed wave-green, sea-wave, and formerly czar green), steel-grey, and olive (which is used to describe two markedly different shades of green).

The aqua "wave-green" colour serves as the colour of the parade uniform of officers and army bands. The wave-green colour draws its origins from the 19th and early 20th century Imperial Russian era uniforms in which it was known as "czar green". Following an absence during the early Soviet period, it was restored to all parade uniforms of marshals and generals starting with the 1945 Moscow Victory Parade. Subsequently, the wave-green coloured parade uniforms were introduced to all commissioned and warrant army officers in 1969. In 1994, the colour was abolished once again with the establishment of the distinct uniforms for Russia. This color was once officially again restored to all officer and warrant officer ranks of the Ground Forces in 2010 after usage at the Moscow Victory Day Parade since 2008, thus restoring continuity with previous uniforms.

Grey colour is a colour also used for ceremonial purposes. Formerly the staple colour of officer and other ceremonial winter uniform items such as greatcoats under both the Soviet and Imperial periods, it now only serves in this role for honour guards. The "gala" walking-out parade tunics of generals is also in this colour.

There are two distinctive colours called olive in the Russian Armed Forces. The first colour to be called this was used for the universal service dress and parade uniform for all ranks between 1994 and 2008. This replaced the similar but nevertheless different khaki colour used by a number of Soviet uniforms. Following the 2008 uniform reforms, this colour was retained for service dress, enlisted parade uniform usage. Since the introduction of the office uniform in 2012, the second colour to be called olive is a noticeably different bright shade of green. Infantry berets introduced during this period noticeably remained in the 1994 shade of olive. The 1994 shade of olive is additionally still used for general and officer service dress, however, the service dress uniform itself is seldom used today.

=== Aerospace and Airborne Forces ===
The uniforms of the Aerospace Forces and Airborne Forces of the Russian Federation and Soviet Union are traditionally blue. The Air Force command staff wore a blue uniform in the 1920s and 1930s (with interruptions). Pre-war and early Second World War pilots also wore blue. Later in the war, the tunic colouring was reverted to khaki for all ranks, however, the universal breeches colouring of blue applied in parade dress (this also applied the Ground Forces until the M69 uniforms were introduced). From 1955-1957, there was a short-lived revival of the blue tunic colouring for Air Force officers. In 1969 there was a full blue revival for officer parade dress. Apart from this, officer and airmen uniforms were khaki coloured. The 1994 uniforms kept blue as the primary service and parade dress colour, however, this quickly fell out of use in the late 1990s and early 2000s. Blue was once again revived as part of the 2008 uniform reforms to a position similar to the 1969 role, with the exception being that Air Force officers and generals wear a blue service dress instead of olive (which had replaced khaki in the Russian Federation). This exception does not apply to Space Forces or Airborne Forces officers and generals, who continue to wear olive. The 2012-introduced office uniform is blue for all Air Force and Airborne Forces personnel and olive for all Space Forces personnel.

Throughout the existence of the Russian Federation, the Airborne Forces have continued to use the telnyashka and sky-blue beret from the Soviet period as a mark of distinction from the rest of the Aerospace Forces uniform set.

In the place of crown eagles, Air Force pilots and Honour Guard units have pilot brevets. This is in contrast to the Soviet period in which all officers, regardless of rank, had brevets.

== Current designs ==
Typically, uniforms are divided into the following categories, each with summer and winter variations:

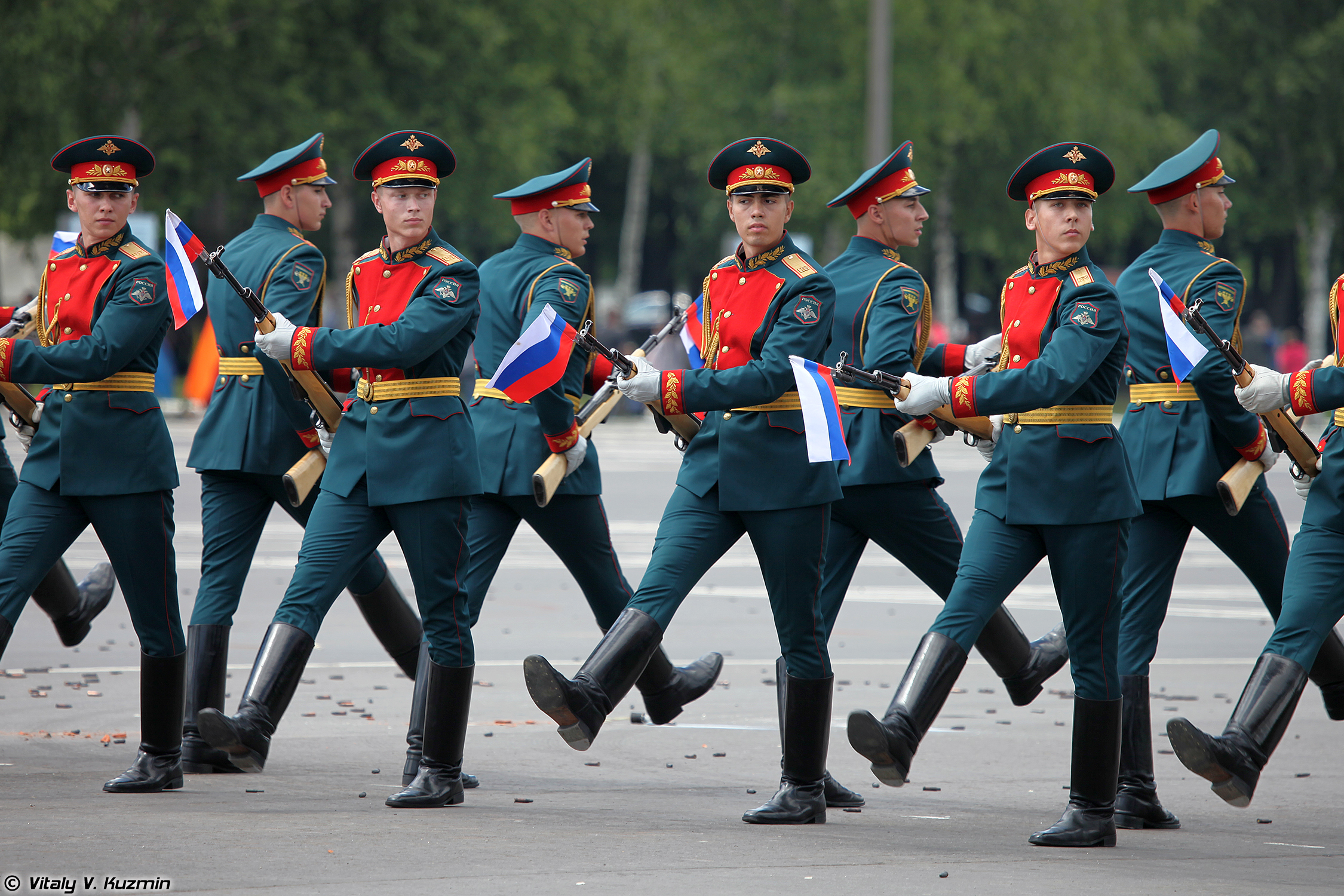
Army servicemen wearing the summer honour guard uniform

=== Ceremonial honour guard uniform ===
Issued to and typically worn by the servicemen of the 154th Preobrazhensky Independent Commandant's Regiment, this uniform is also worn by troops of other regiments depending on the nature of the occasion. The colours of the uniform are wave-green for the Army, blue for the Aerospace Forces, and black or white for the Navy.

The standard ceremonial honour guard uniform consists of a peaked cap, a standing-collar tunic with a plastron, breeches, and jackboots (swapped with dress pants and shoes for the Navy honour guard). Hot weather seasonal variations include the replacement of the closed-collar tunic with a white shirt-jacket and a black tie. Demi-season ceremonial dress adds a standing-collar greatcoat (grey for army, blue for Air Force, and black for navy). During winter, the greatcoat has an astrakhan collar-lining and the peaked hat is replaced with an astrakhan ushanka.

=== Parade uniform ===
Typically only assigned to officers (including warrant officers) and service personnel of military bands of the Armed Forces. The colours of the uniform are wave-green for the Ground Forces (except Spetsnaz units), blue for the Aerospace Forces and Spetsnaz units, and black or white for the Navy (depending on the season in which the uniform is used).

The uniform is used for the following occasions:

- Participation in parades and at official events
- On holidays of the military unit
- Upon receipt of state awards
- During a ceremony of presentation of colours within military units and educational institutions
- Upon launching of a ship
- When raising the Navy flag upon the ship
- Enlistment in guards of honour
- While serving as sentries for the protection of the Battle Colour of a military unit
- When serving as bandsmen/women in military bands
- Servicemen may also wear this uniform on weekends, outside of work hours

The peaked caps for parade uniforms feature coloured headbands largely based upon the Soviet uniform regulations. Below are the variations for these as well as other uniform colour variations:

Parade uniform colouration
Service	Branch of service	Uniform colour	Cap band colour	Uniform piping
Ground Forces	Motorised Rifles Officers	Wave-green	Red	Red
Ground Forces	Tank officers	Wave-green	Black	Red
Ground Forces	Military police officers	Wave-green	Red	Red
Ground Forces	Rocket and artillery officers	Wave-green	Black	Red
Ground Forces	Air defence officers	Wave-green	Black	Red
Ground Forces	Special corps officers	Wave-green	Black	Red
Ground Forces	Army Band Personnel	Wave-green	Red	Red
Special Forces of the G.U.	Special Forces of the G.U. officers	Blue	Azure	Azure
Strategic Missile Forces	Strategic Missile officers	Wave-green	Black	Red
Aerospace Forces	Air Force officers	Blue	Azure	Azure
Aerospace Forces	Space Forces officers	Blue	Azure	Azure
Airborne Forces	Airborne Forces officers	Blue	Azure	Azure

Other notable variations of this type of uniform are included in the cockade, type of footwear, and type of tunic.

The wreathed cockade or the ordinary oval cockade are the most common variants, with the former being standard issue for army bandsmen and the latter being the standard issue for officers. The more formal wreathed cockade is also used by officers on special ceremonial occasions like the Moscow Victory Day Parade and maintains continuity through wreath design with the style used by all air force and navy pilots throughout the existence of the Soviet Union, the USSR Army Officers from 1958-1969, and the enlisted troops from 1969-1994 (though the latter had a red star instead of an oval within the wreath). Additionally, there is a special wide-wreath cockade design specifically assigned to members of the Alexandrov Ensemble which bears resemblance to the parade cockade used by the officer corps between 1969 and 1994.

Dress shoes are the standard footwear for officers and army bandsmen in both walking-out and in formation variations. For the Ground Forces Officers in formation, this replaced sapogi following the abolition of the Soviet-era uniforms in 1994. Nonetheless, jackboots have returned use for the Ground Forces parade uniform on special ceremonial occasions including the aforementioned Moscow Victory Day Parade from 2019 onwards. Regarding tunic variations, the standard tunic is a standing-collar design, though a special double-breasted open-collar variant is used by the Alexandrov Ensemble and a double-breasted steel-grey open-collar variant is an option for generals.

Walking-out variations include making the officer dress belt and dagger optional.

Medals are worn unless the steel-grey tunic for generals is worn (in which case medal ribbons are displayed) or the unregulated Alexandrov Ensemble tunic is worn (in which case it is left empty).

=== Service dress uniform ===
Officially "Casual Uniform Option 1", this uniform is a standard-issue uniform for officers (including warrant officers) equivalent to service dress. The colours of the uniform are olive green for the Army, Airborne Forces, Spetsnaz Units, and Space Forces, blue for the other Aerospace Forces sub branches, and black or white (season determinant) for the Navy.

The kit formerly served the everyday, dress, and parade roles for enlisted servicemen until its abolition for these purposes in 2015 due to cost-cutting measures. Since then, it is only assigned to officers and warrant officers. Additionally, it served as the sole everyday uniform for officers until being progressively supplanted by the Office Uniform from 2012 to 2015. It is now de facto used for more formal occasions relative to the cheaper Office Uniform though no regulation officially stipulates which is to be used per occasion. De jure, both are equal casual service dress options for officers.

Dress uniform colouration
Service	Branch of service	Uniform colour	Cap band colour	Uniform piping	Shirt colour
Ground Forces	Motorised Rifles officers	Olive green	Red	Red	Light green
Ground Forces	Tank officers	Olive green	Black	Red	Light green
Ground Forces	Military police officers	Olive green	Red	Red	Light green
Ground Forces	Rocket and artillery officers	Olive green	Black	Red	Light green
Ground Forces	Air defence officers	Olive green	Black	Red	Light green
Ground Forces	Special corps officers	Olive green	Black	Red	Light green
Ground Forces	Spetsnaz (G.U.) officers	Olive green	Azure	Azure	Light green
Strategic Missile Forces	Strategic Missile Forces officers	Olive green	Black	Red	Light green
Aerospace Forces	Space Forces officers	Olive green	Azure	Azure	Light green
Aerospace Forces	Airborne Forces officers	Olive green	Azure	Azure	Light green
Aerospace Forces	Air Force officers	Blue	Azure	Azure	Light blue

=== Office uniform ===
Modelled on the everyday office uniform of the Ministry of Emergency Situations, this kit serves as the regular everyday uniform for both officers and enlisted servicemen. It noticeably features no coloured hat band or shoulder boards between branch distinctions which are common in higher-tier uniforms. The office uniform is blue for the Air Force, green for the Ground Forces, and black for the Navy. It includes a zipper jacket, t-shirt, a cap (typically worn by enlisted troops) or peaked cap without a coloured band (typically worn by officers), and the option of wearing combat boots or dress shoes. For the cold seasons, a branch-corresponding coloured jacket was introduced with a snap-on hood with fur lining incorporated.

In 2015, the rules surrounding wearing military uniforms were officially changed. This noticeably included the abolition of parade and dress uniform kit for conscripts[15] and all ranks below that of warrant officer. The office uniform was rolled out to all ranks in 2016 and now serves in the parade and dress roles (with various modifications) for all ranks below that of warrant officer in addition to its everyday capacity.

With the exception of sporadic issuing of the ceremonial, parade, and dress uniforms to non-warrant officer enlisted servicemen for niche purposes, the office uniform kit is also used for the vast majority of ceremonial purposes by non-warrant officer enlisted servicemen. However, significant variations not covered by the official uniform code exist when used for ceremonial purposes including:

- White parade gloves
- White leather buckled parade belts
- White aiguillettes
- Coloured branch shoulder boards
- Branch-distinctive lapel badges
- Pressed-collar buttoned jackets as opposed to the zipper jacket used in the standard office kit
- Berets used as the main headdress as opposed to caps or peaked caps.
- Occasional jackboots (sapogi) for foot columns and colour guards (now increasingly present for infantry troops during the Moscow Victory Day Parade)

These ceremonial variations, with the exception of the headdress and footwear differences, carry over from the now-in-abeyance dress uniform kit which was used for this role.

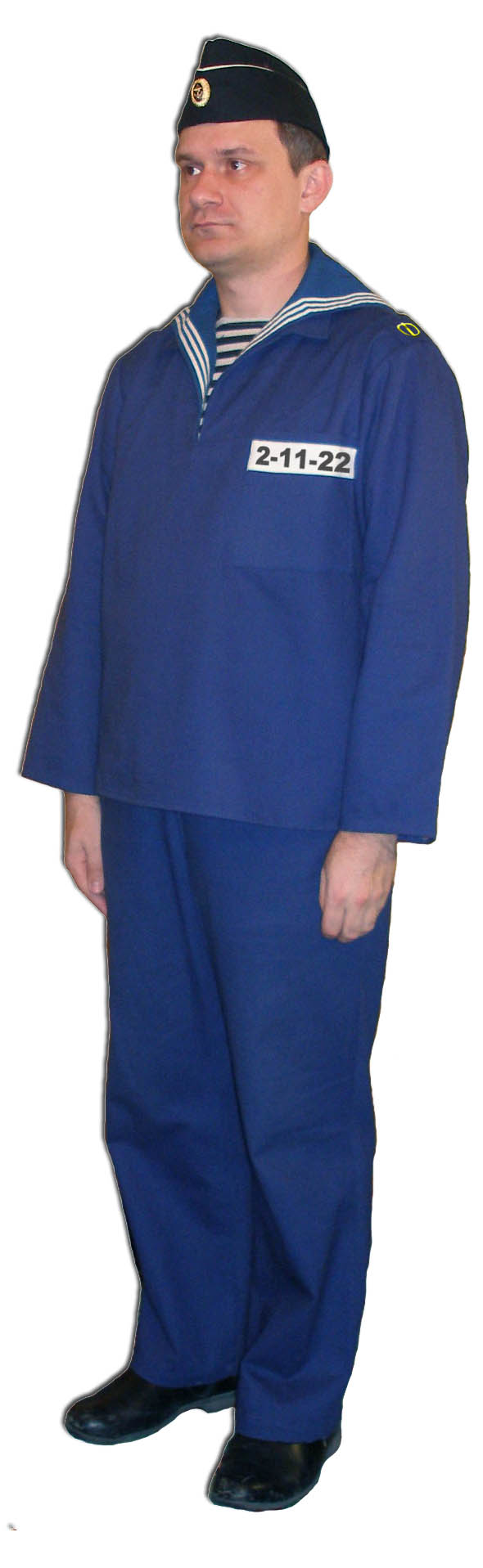
Russian Navy working uniform, including a side cap

=== Field and working uniforms ===
The VKPO (in English translation the abbreviation stands for "All weather Set of Field Uniforms") field uniform acts as the primary field/combat uniform which is assigned to all troops who operate in the field.

=== Examples ===
Ground Forces enlisted kits in common configuration

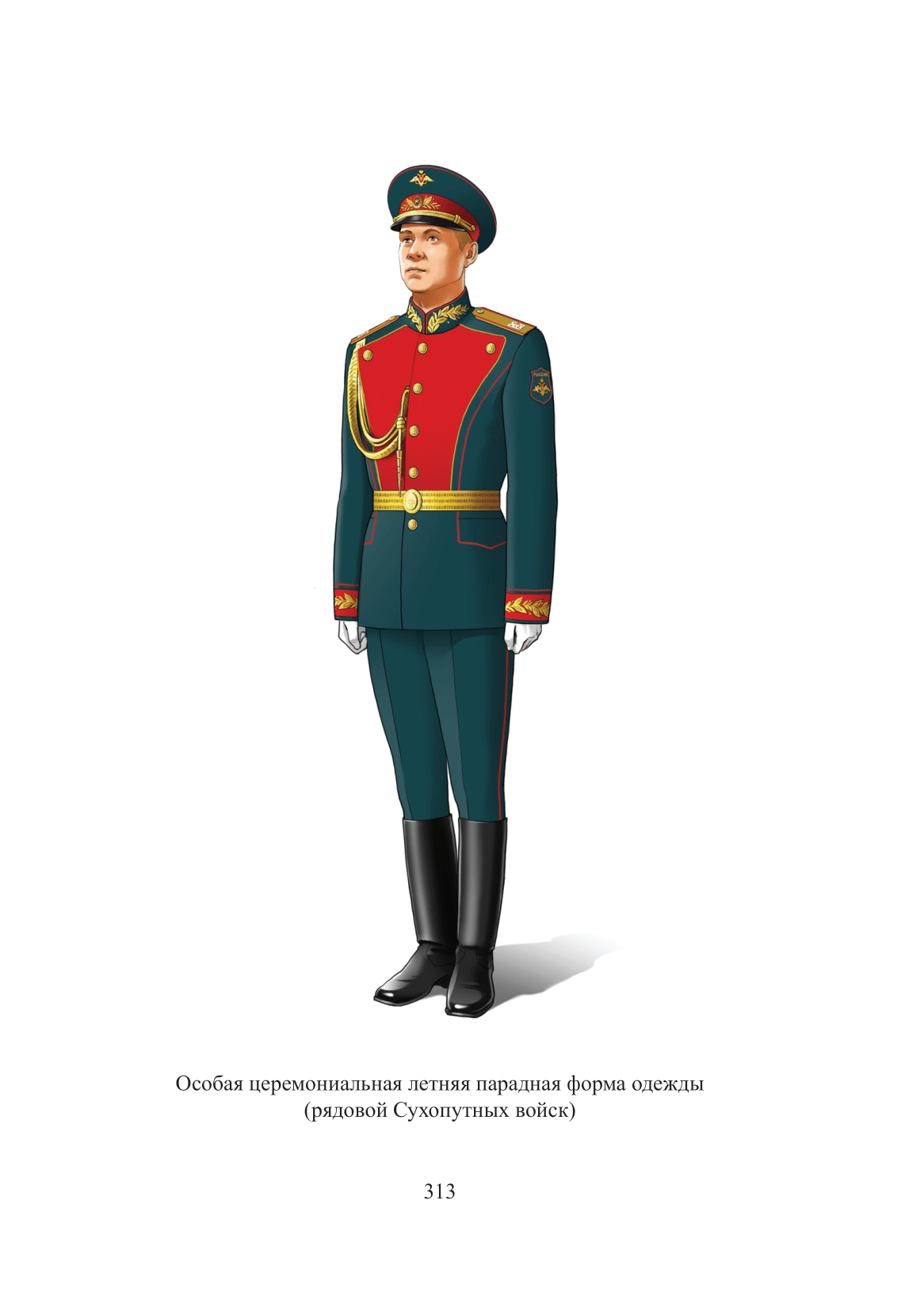
Honour guard uniform

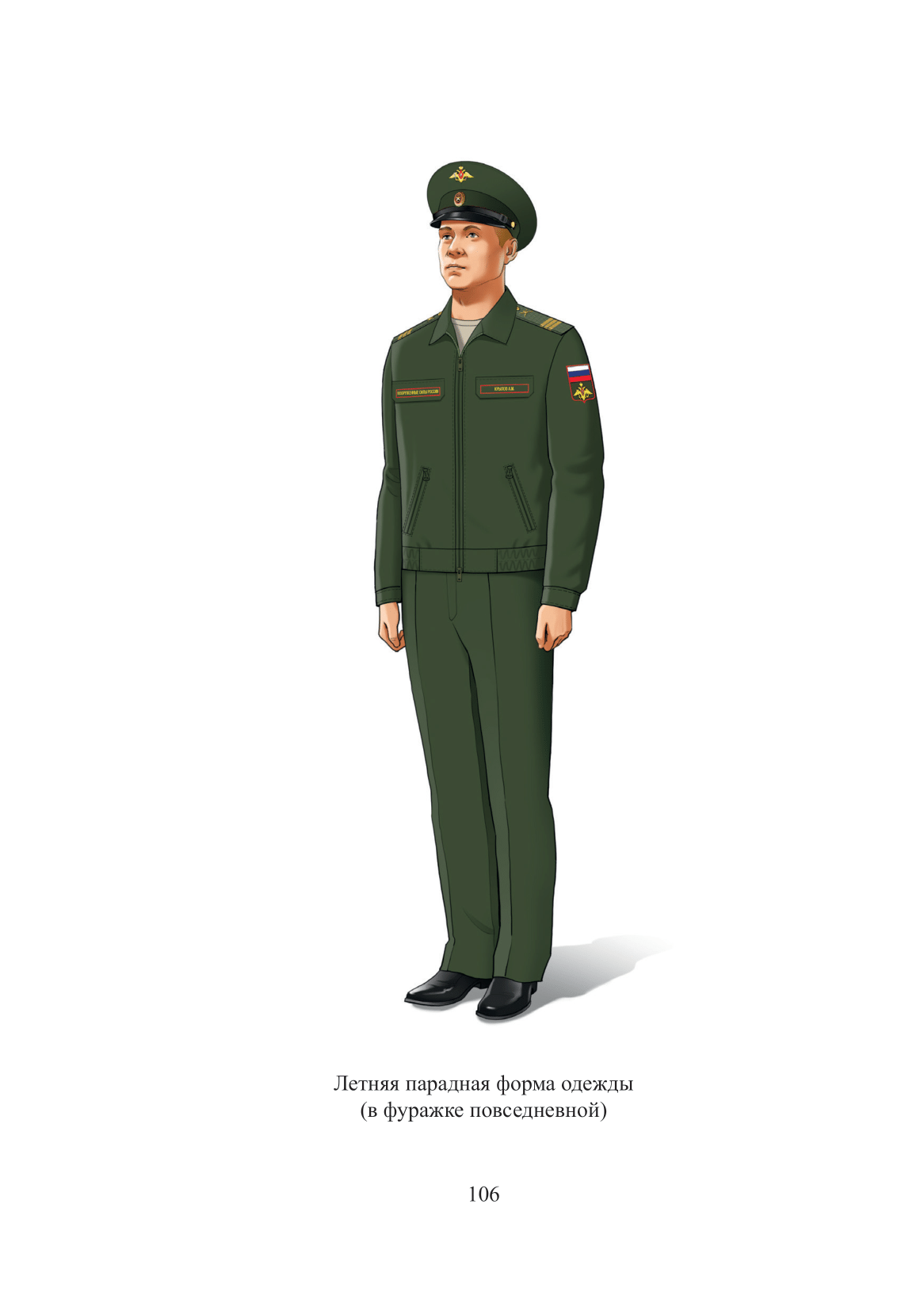
Office uniform (with peaked cap - typical for contract servicemen)

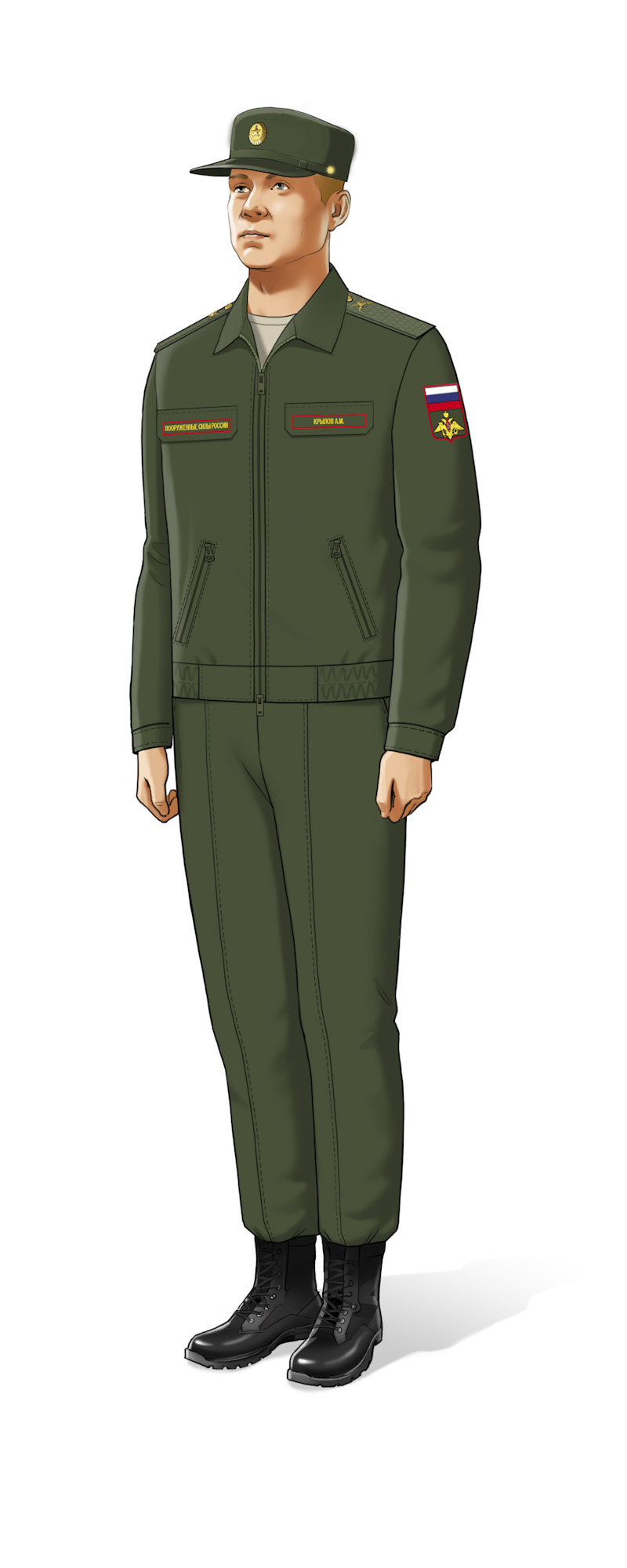
Office uniform (with ordinary cap - typical for conscripts)
Ground Forces officer kits in common configuration

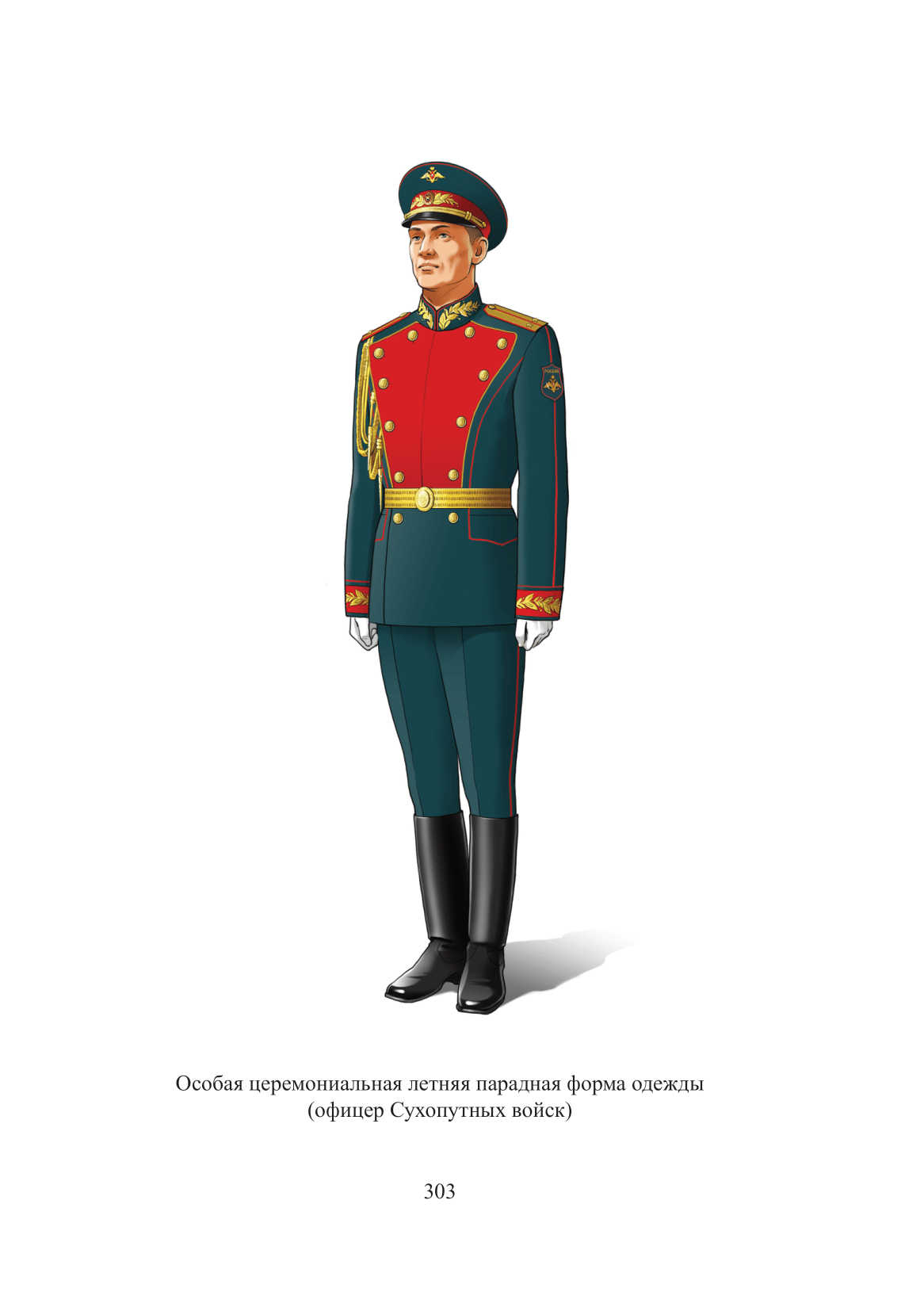
Honour guard uniform

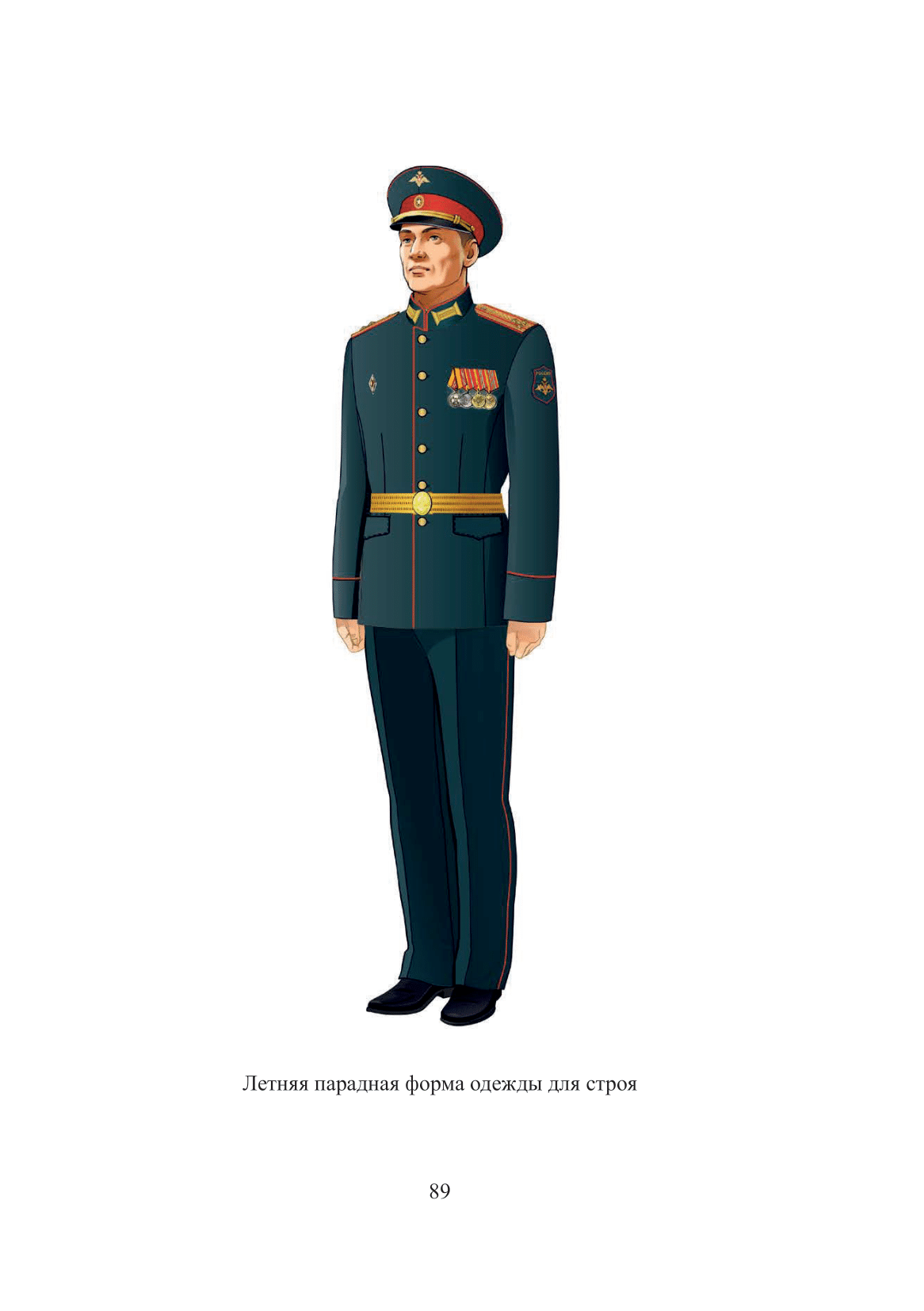
Parade uniform

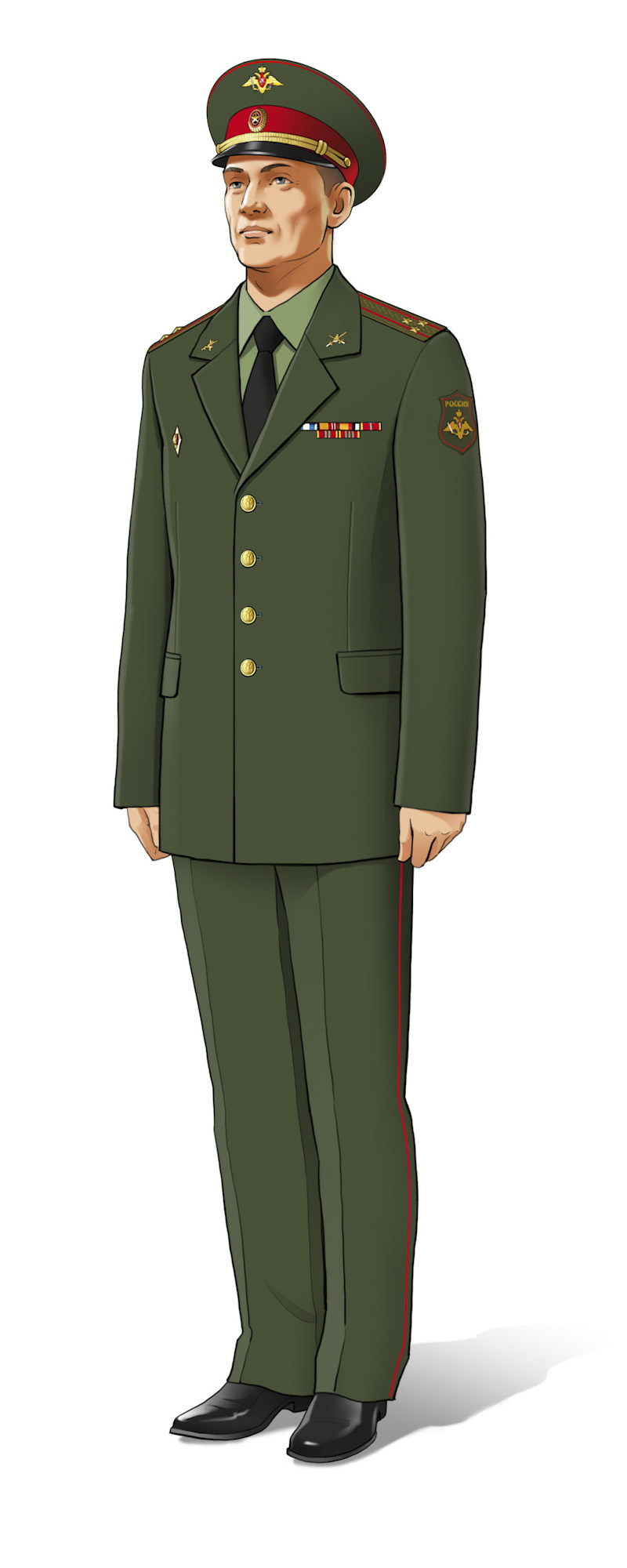
Service dress uniform

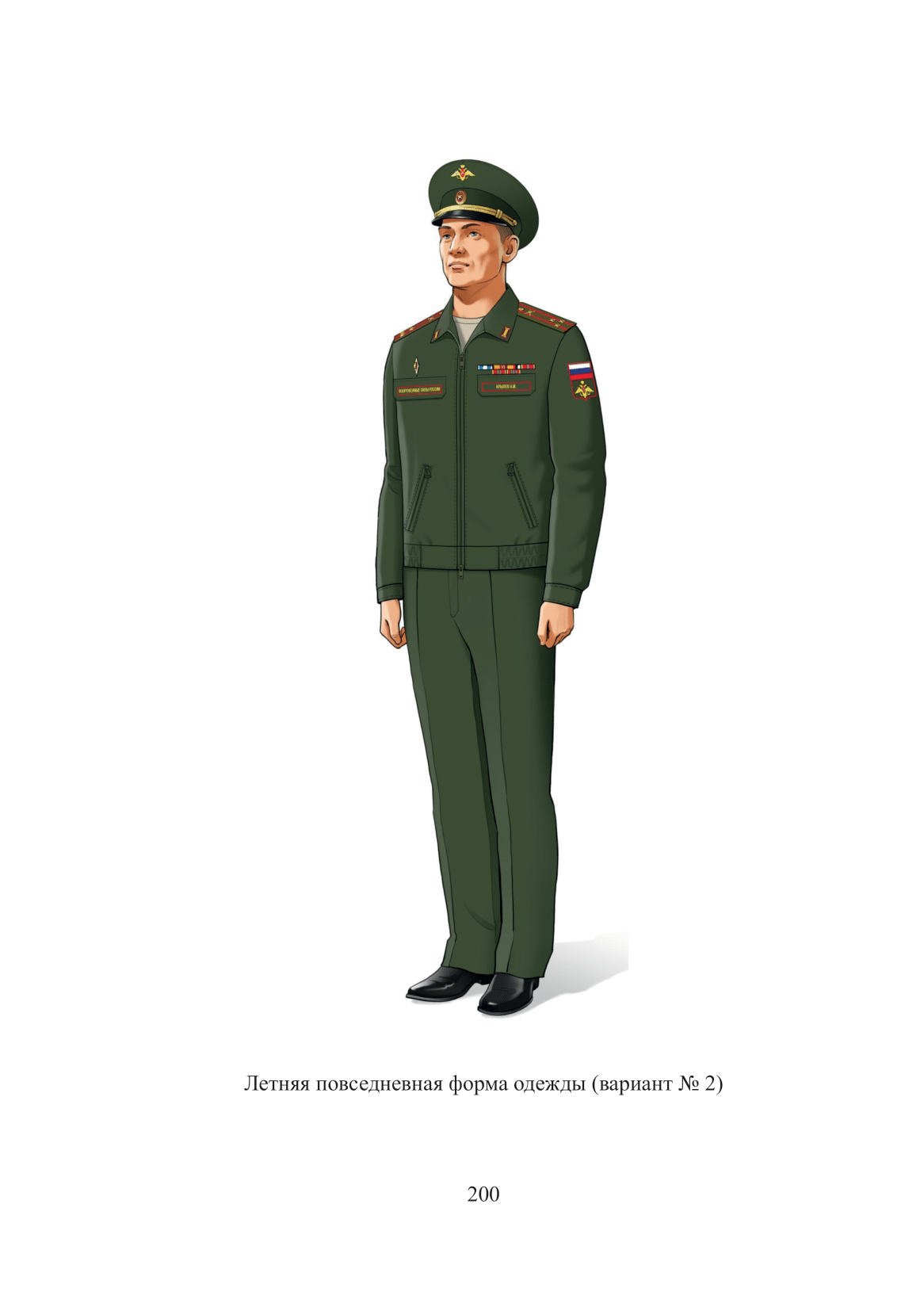
Office uniform

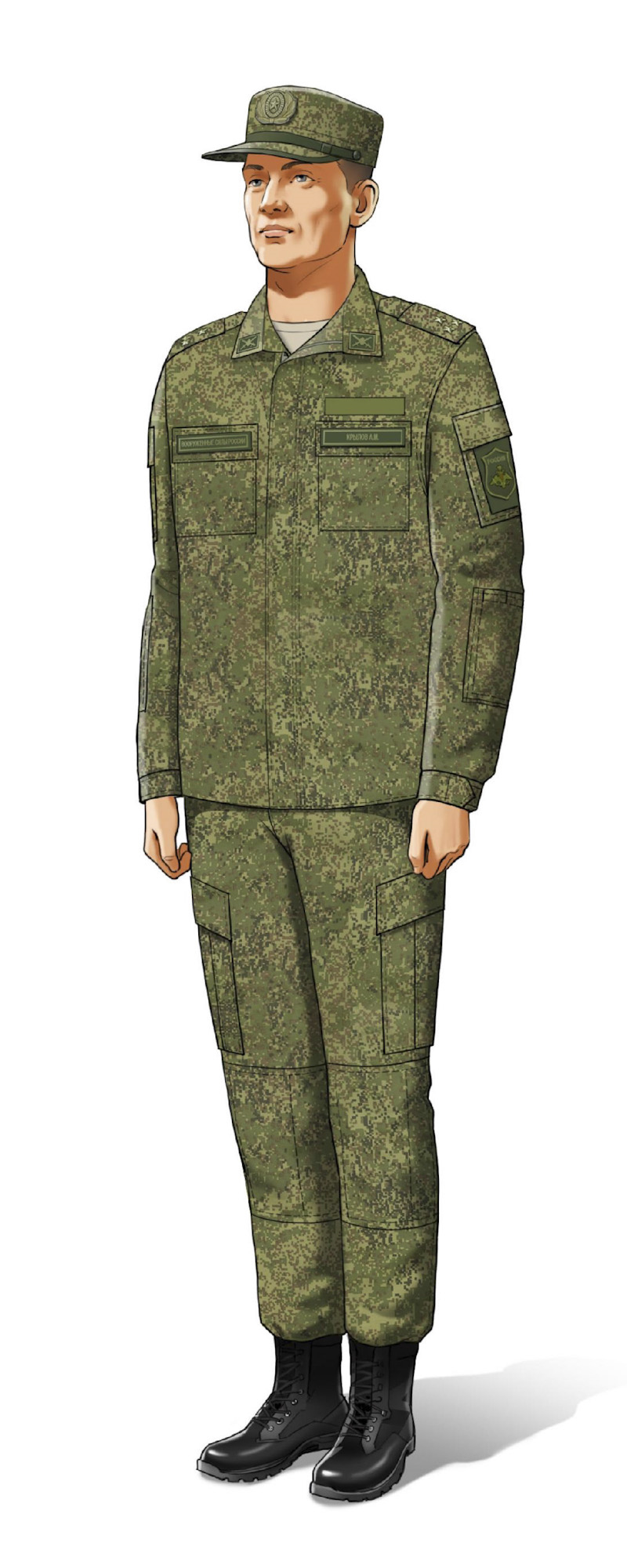
Field uniform with EMR camouflage
Ground Forces general uniform types

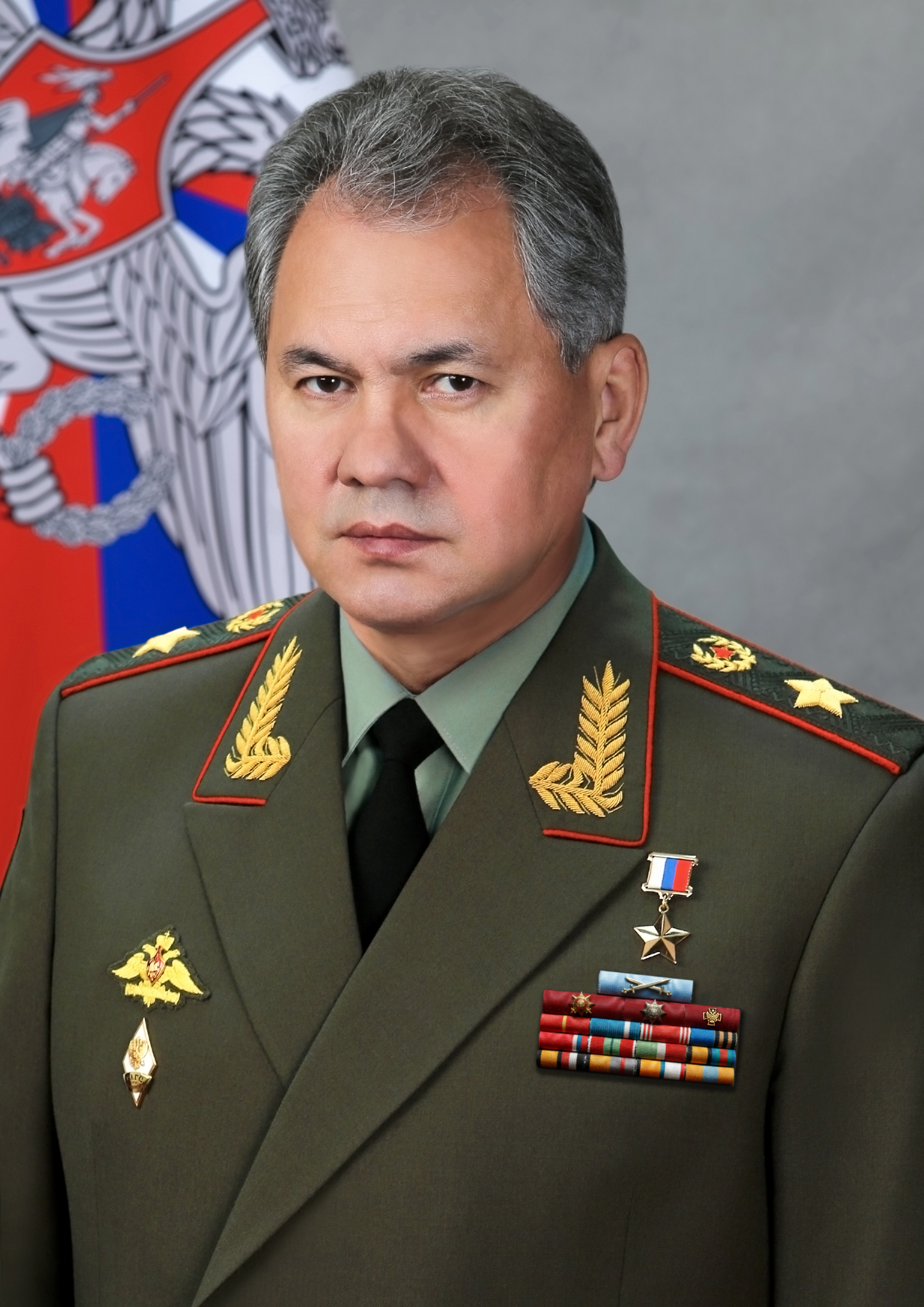
Sergey Shoigu in dress uniform

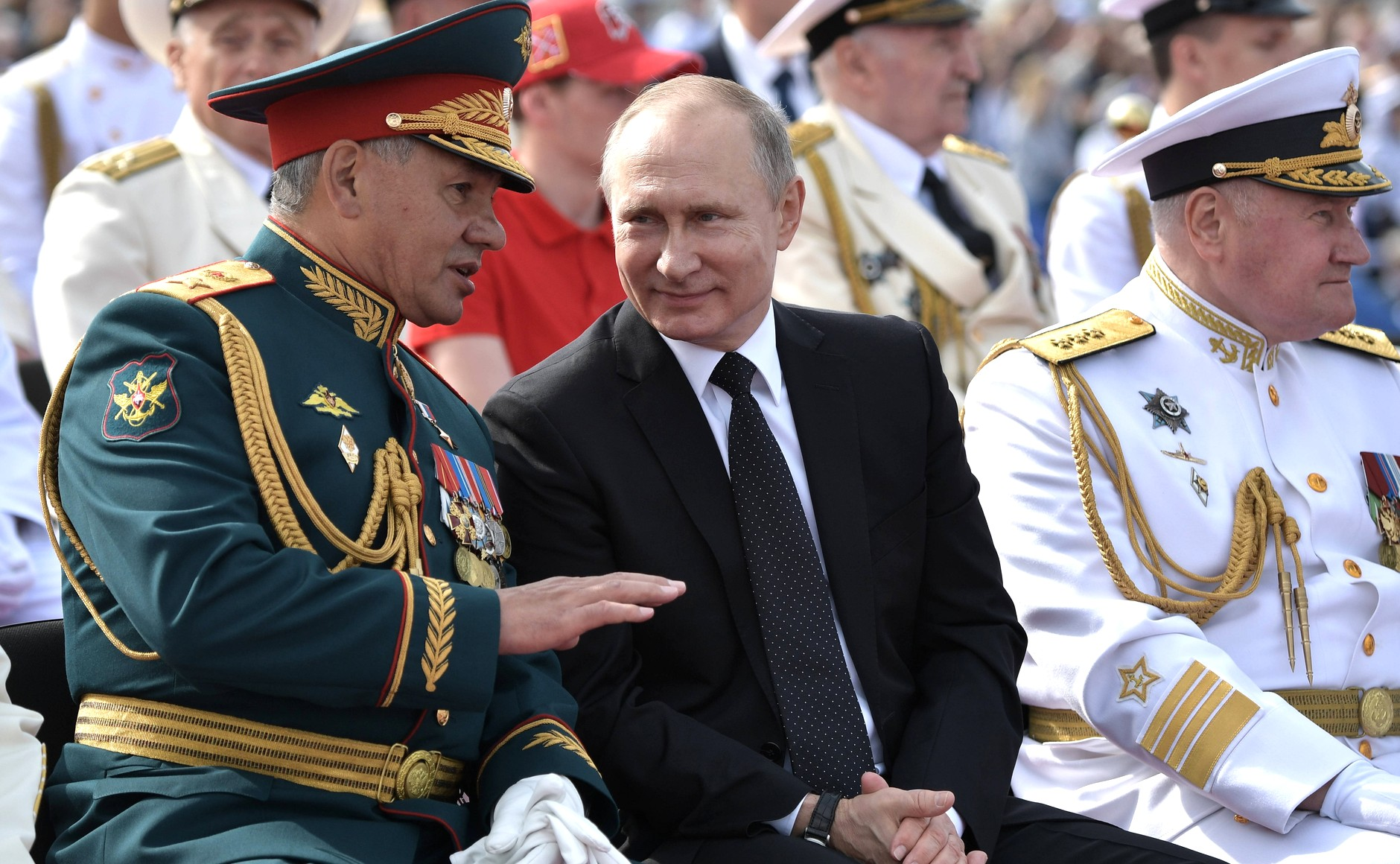
Shoigu in closed collar parade uniform (debuted 2017 in the Moscow Victory Day Parade, introduced beginning 2018)

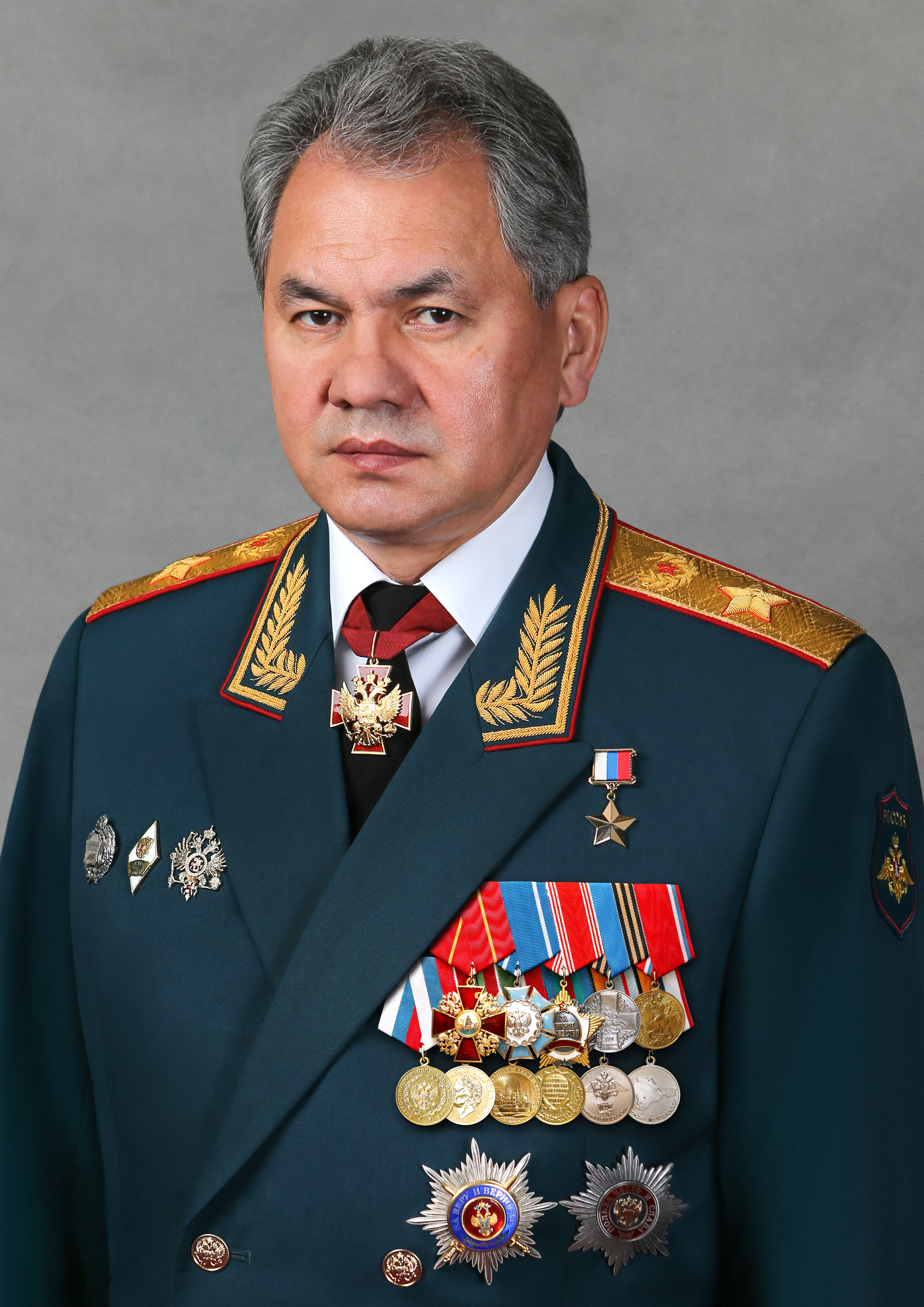
Shoigu in open collar parade uniform (phased out beginning 2018)

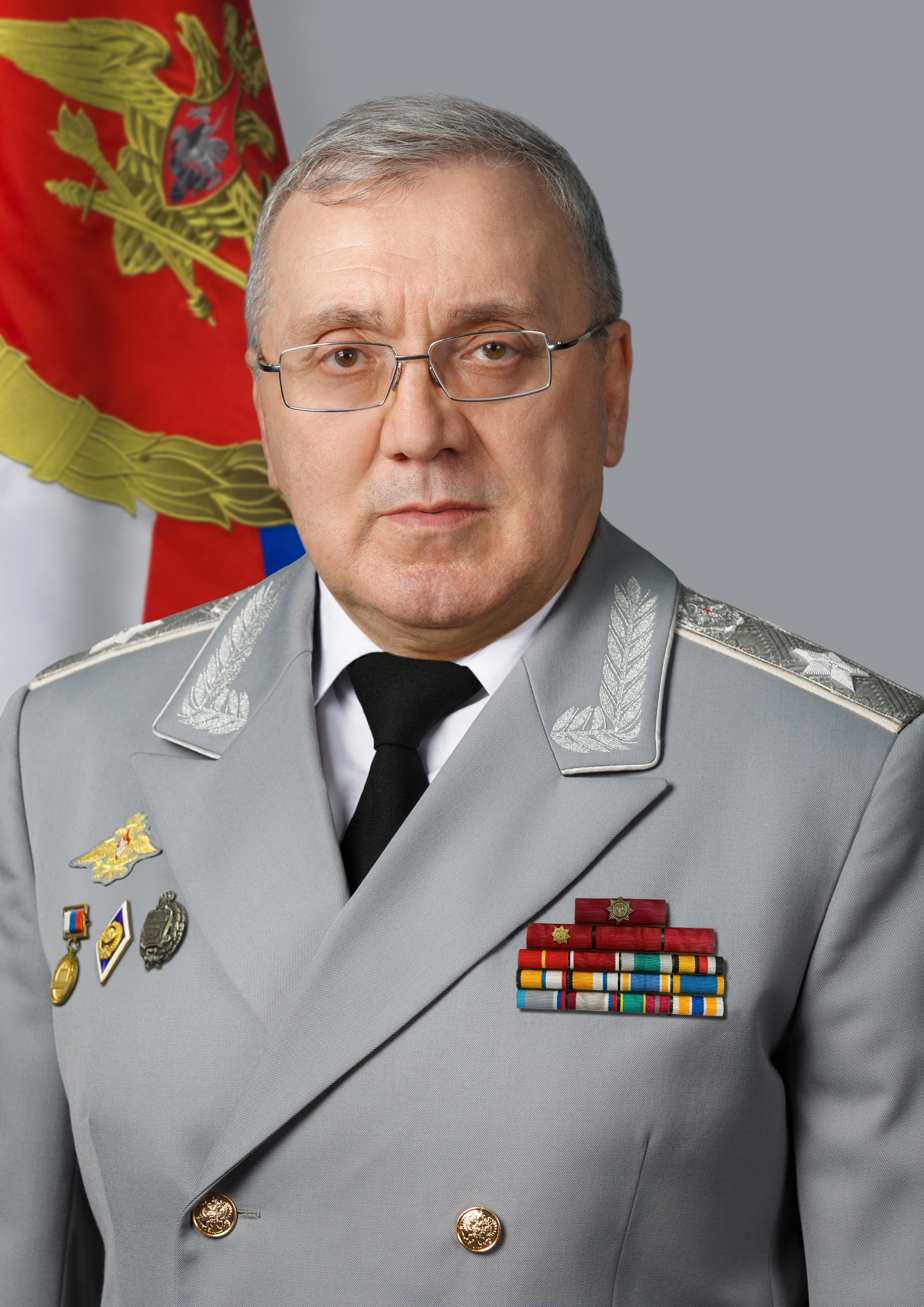
Ruslan Tsalikov in a grey dress uniform

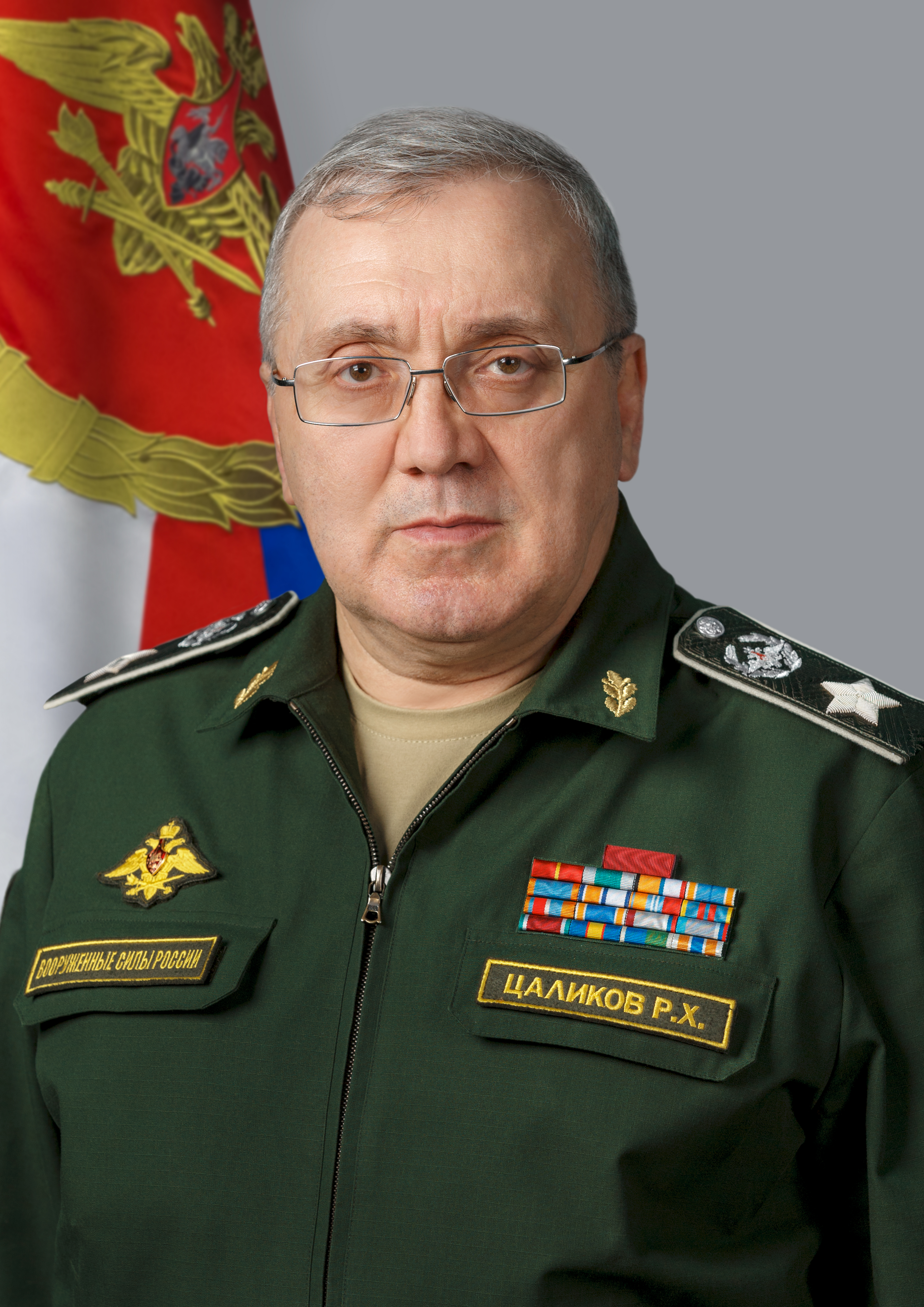
Tsalikov in everyday "office" uniform. Silver piping indicates a civilian employee.

== History ==
Since the collapse of the Soviet Union, the uniforms of the Russian Federation have undergone a number of changes, including major reforms in 1994, 2008, 2011, 2012, 2015, and 2018.

=== 1992–1994 ===
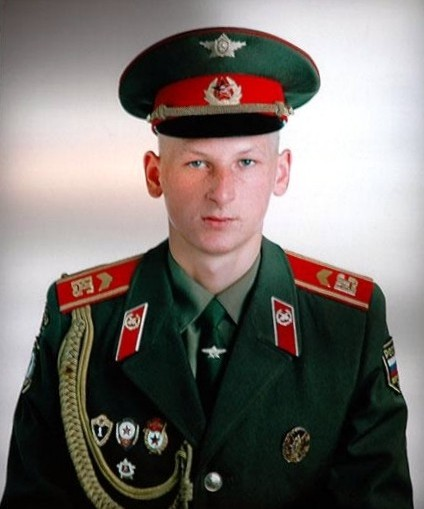
A Western Group of Forces senior sergeant wearing a modified post-Soviet honour guard uniform. Noteworthy changes from the Soviet period include shoulder patches and the "ВС" letters, meaning 'Armed Forces' (Russian: Bооружённые силы) which replaced the "СА" letters of the Soviet Army.

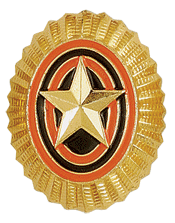
The cockade in use from 1994–2006 and again from 2010 (after debuting again at the 2008 Moscow Victory Day Parade)

==== Modified post-Soviet uniforms ====
On 21 December 1991, the CIS member countries agreed to maintain a unified command of the Armed Forces until they were reformed.

On 11 February 1992, following Commander-in-Chief of the CIS Armed Forces Order No. 50 "On temporary changes in the military uniform for the period 1992–1995", a description was given of "temporary changes" in uniforms. For marshals and generals, a ceremonial cap was introduced, modelled on the everyday, parade uniform-dress uniform, according to the pattern of the everyday jacket, but with ceremonial shoulder boards, dressed-out trousers without boots, with edges along the line. It also authorized officer's model caps in the summer everyday form. In May 1992 the Armed Forces of the Russian Federation were established.

The hats worn by marshals, generals and colonels were abolished, replaced by astrakhan hat-earflaps of grey color from the fur of tsigeyki (colonels). The edges of the ceremonial uniforms of officers, ensigns, servicemen of the extended service and women servicemen, as well as armor-type arm plates for the latter three categories were abolished. A cockade was introduced for officers, warrant officers, and servicemen of super-long service for everyday and dress uniforms.

Berets for military servicemen and caps for ceremonial dress uniforms of military servicemen were replaced by officer-type pilots. The woollen jackets of marshals, generals, officers, ensigns and servicemen of extra-long-term services replaced button fasteners with zippers, and sewn side pockets closed with zippers.

Marshals, officers, ensigns and servicemen of extra-long service lost their ceremonial belts as well as the leather shoulder strap.

Conscripts and cadets adopted a woollen uniform fitted with sewn epaulets of the same material in place of the parade-out uniform and closed everyday jacket.

The letters "СА" were removed from shoulder straps of service members of urgent service, while the metal letter "К" on shoulder straps of field jackets and everyday cadets was added. Buttonholes were removed from collars of service members and cadets, while the golden emblems on cotton tunics were fastened to collar corners.

The same document introduced changes in generals' uniforms, compared with the 1988 Soviet Army. Sewing on ceremonial caps and uniforms became similar to every day and disappeared from the cuffs (along with the sutured edge on collar and cuffs). Trousers were set to the grey front-and-back tunic, with cuffs, but without lamphas, in the tone of the tunic. The cap had a grey crown and colored band.

Since 1994 the field uniform had the special, but unofficial sleeve insignias: the branch of service or the military unit.

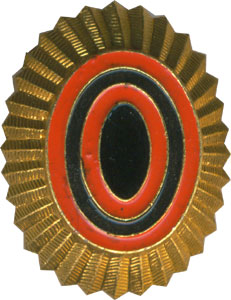
The cockade in use from 2006–2010.

=== 1994–2008 ===
==== M94 first Russian Federation uniforms ====
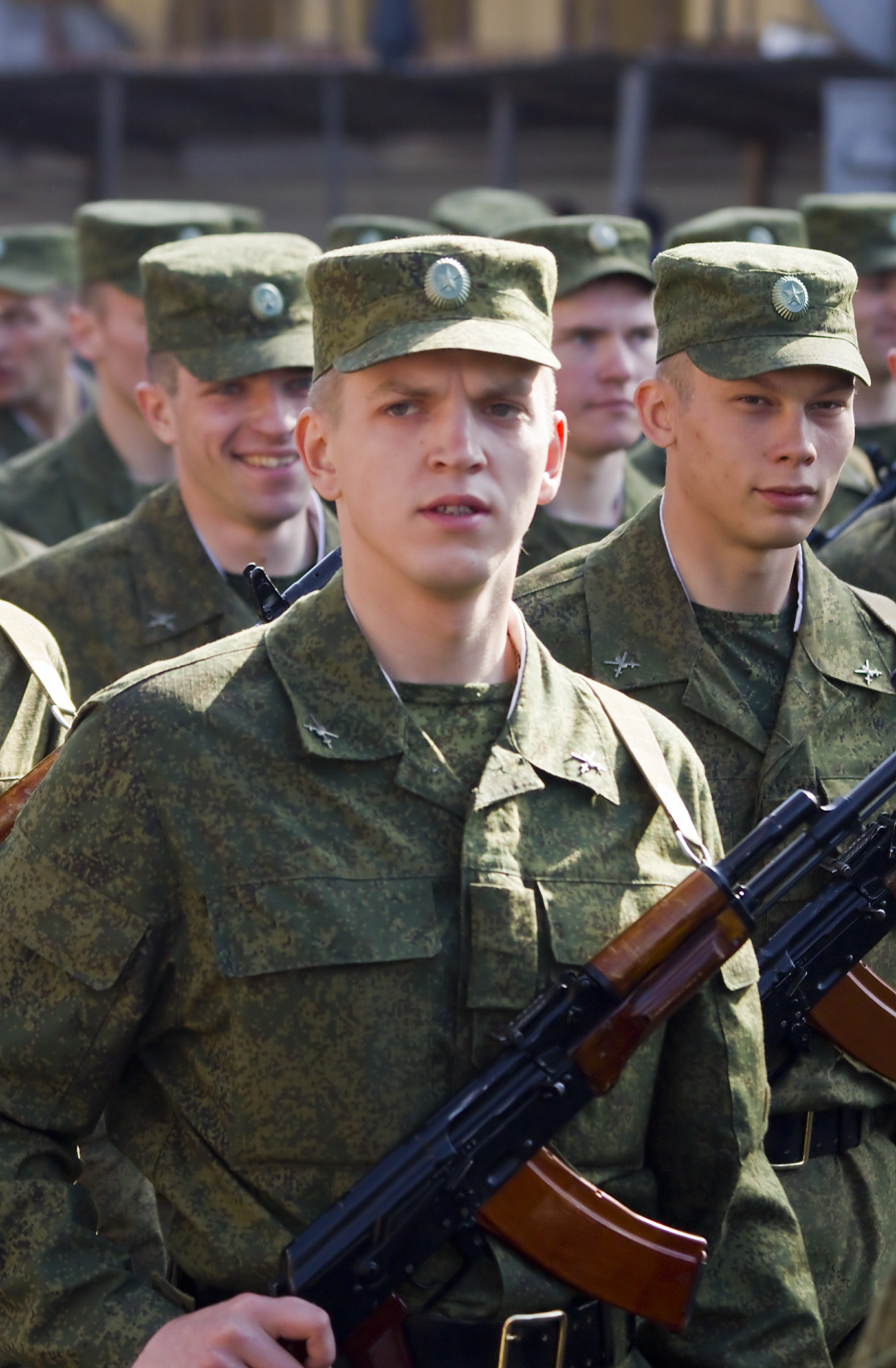
Soldiers in the 2008 combat uniform, using new EMR camouflage

In 1994, President Boris Yeltsin signed a decree that abolished the Soviet-era uniform and changed military dress for the first time since 1969.

The 1994 uniform reforms included a new army and air force cockade which had connection to both the Imperial era, through the orange and black St George ovals, and Soviet-era, through the retention of a star. Heraldically, the cockade was not a symbol of the Russian Federation, but rather the Ministry of Defence of the Russian Federation. Thus, it is denoted with departmental, not the national, affiliation of the serviceman.

In 2005, the double-headed eagle was removed from the officer caps. Astrakan hats and collars were additionally returned to generals and colonels.

In 2006, the cockade was changed to remove the gold star, returning fully to the Imperial design, with plans to roll it out across all troops. This was to be short-lived however, as the 2008 reforms of Valentin Yudashkin returned to the 1994 cockade design.

=== 2008–2012 ===
==== Initial reforms under Serdyukov ====
In 2007, Anatoly Serdyukov was appointed as the Minister of Defence. On 19 May 2007, Serdyukov revealed the need for the development of a new uniform. Days later, fashion designer Valentin Yudashkin was announced to be the designer of the project. The set of uniforms were unveiled in January 2008. The project resulted in a total overhaul, including a new parade uniform, everyday uniform, and field uniform for all branches of service. Additionally changed was the ceremonial honour guard uniform. New EMR camouflage pattern was created.

Combining traditions of both the Soviet and Imperial periods, the reformed uniforms incorporated elements of both periods.

For parade uniforms, there was a general return to the style of the Cold War era M69 Soviet parade uniforms, noteworthy exceptions being the lack of jackboots, breeches, gorget patches, cuff piping, and cockade wreathing. Additionally, there were fewer tunic buttons relative to the M69 uniforms (for generals there were four instead of six and for officers three instead of four), and cockade wreathing. Relative to the M94 uniforms the new parade uniforms replaced, there was a return to the sea-wave colour for army officers and blue for aerospace forces officers, a return of peaked cap band colouring, a removal of cockade wreathing, a removal of breast pockets, and a return of double-breasted tunics for generals. Ceremonial winter greatcoats returned to being grey.

=== 2012–present ===
==== Subsequent reforms under Shoygu ====
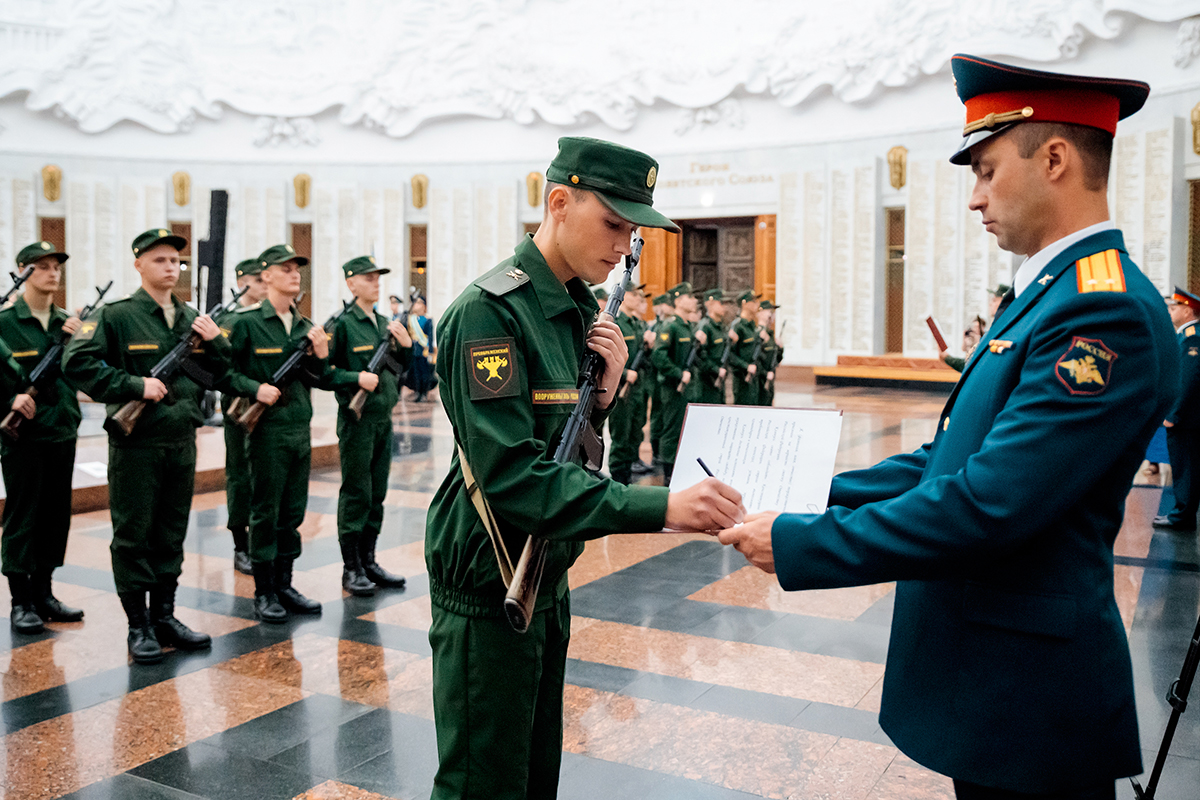
Ground Forces soldiers taking the military oath in the "office" uniform introduced in 2013. Note the officer on the right in the obsolete open-collar tunic which is currently being phased out.

In November 2012, Sergey Shoygu was appointed the Defence Minister of the Ministry of Defence of the Russian Federation. Following his appointment, a number of changes were instituted.

This included the introduction of an entirely distinct "office uniform" in 2013 as a new everyday uniform for officers (of which the prior everyday uniform was a mostly interchangeable with the dress uniform). The office uniform is blue for the Air Force, green for the Ground Forces, and black for the Navy. It includes a zipper jacket, t-shirt, a cap (typically worn by enlisted troops) or peaked cap without the coloured band (typically worn by officers), and the option of wearing combat boots or dress shoes. For the cold seasons, a branch-corresponding coloured jacket was introduced with a snap-on hood with fur lining incorporated.

In 2015, the rules surrounding wearing military uniforms were officially changed. This noticeably included the abolition of parade and dress uniform kit for conscripts and all ranks below that of warrant officer. The office uniform was rolled out to all ranks in 2016 and now serves in the parade and dress roles (with various modifications) for all ranks below that of warrant officer in addition to its everyday capacity. Other changes also included: the removal of the traditional greatcoat for the parade and dress uniforms for all ranks except the honour guards, changing of officer parade/dress tunics to M69 Soviet-style notched lapels instead of peaked lapels, and the return of the M69 Soviet-style button layout for dress and parade uniforms (four buttons for officers and six for generals.)

In the 2017 Moscow Victory Day Parade, officers wore a standing-collar tunic which replaced the previous open-collar tunic. The tunic resembles that which was used in the latter years of World War II by the Soviet Union for ceremonial purposes. The officer corps buttonholes as used by both the Soviet officers during this period and Imperial Russia were added onto the tunics. Generals have the standard ceremonial insignia instead of this design. The colour of the Navy ceremonial uniform was also officially changed to pure white, instead of the off-white/cream used before for the summer version of the ceremonial open-collar uniform. Following a trial, the new tunic design was rolled out beginning in 2018 to all ranks down to and including warrant officer as the standard parade tunic. In the 2018 Moscow Victory Day Parade, the massed bands included musicians of all ranks had noticeably begun using this uniform (similar to the British practice of military bands wearing full dress uniform during parades). Only the Alexandrov Ensemble continues to use an unregulated open-collar wave-green design instead of the closed-collar variant.

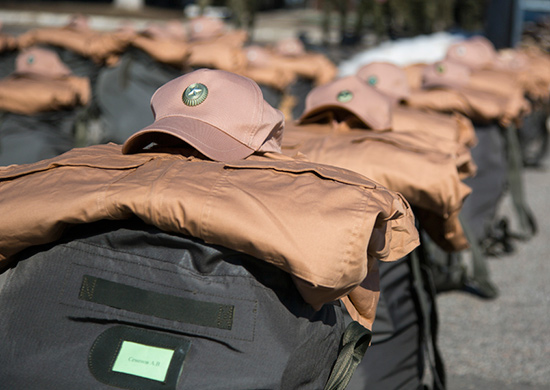
Hot weather uniform for usage in Syria

==== Examples of changes in uniforms since 2012 ====
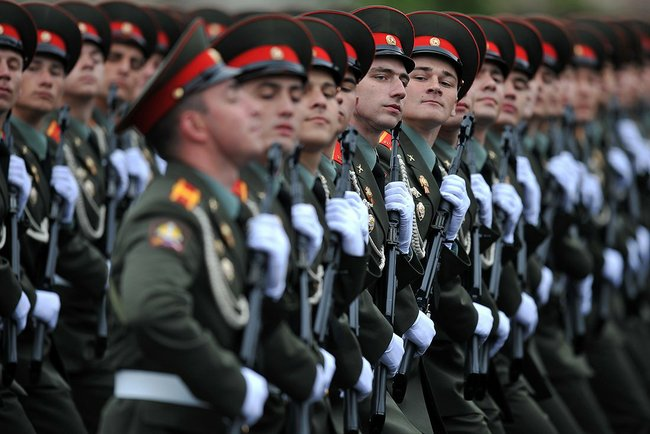
Ground Forces Cadets during the 2012 Moscow Victory Day Parade wearing the former dress uniform, the K on their shoulder boards is for кадет (Cadet)

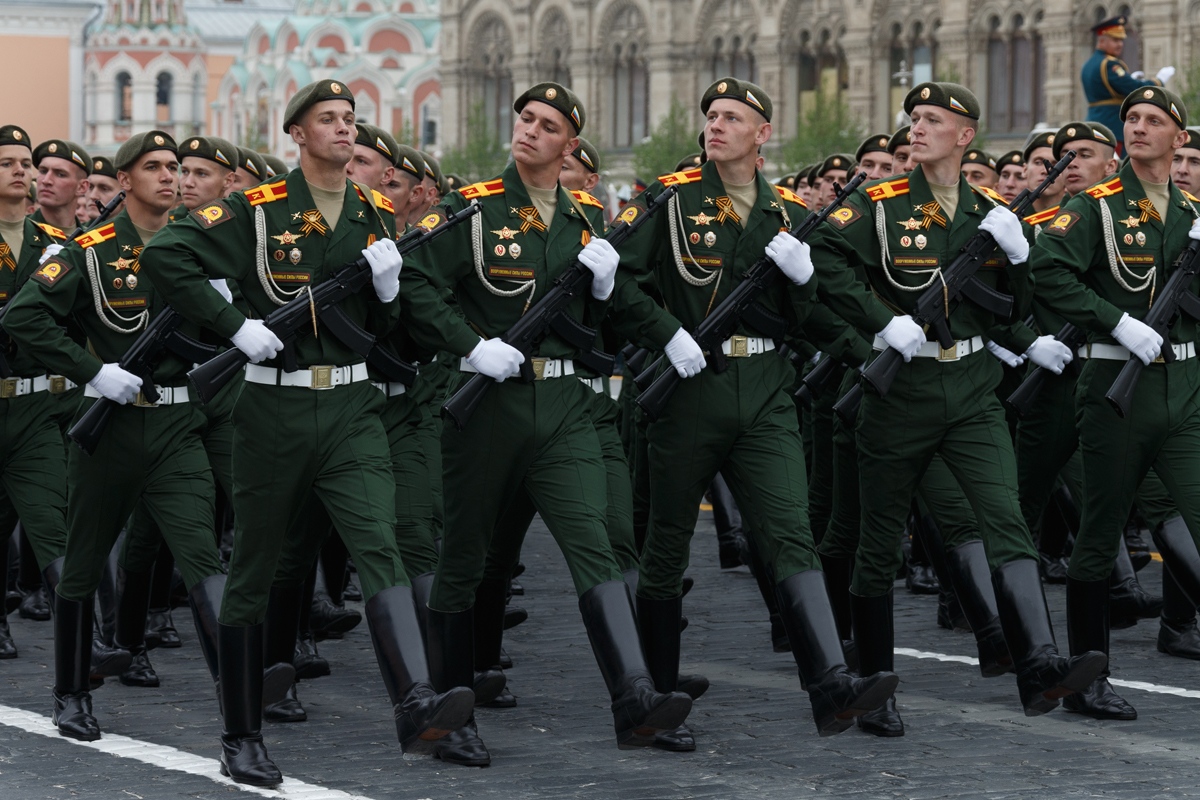
Ground Forces Cadets during the 2019 Moscow Victory Day Parade wearing a ceremonial version of the office uniform

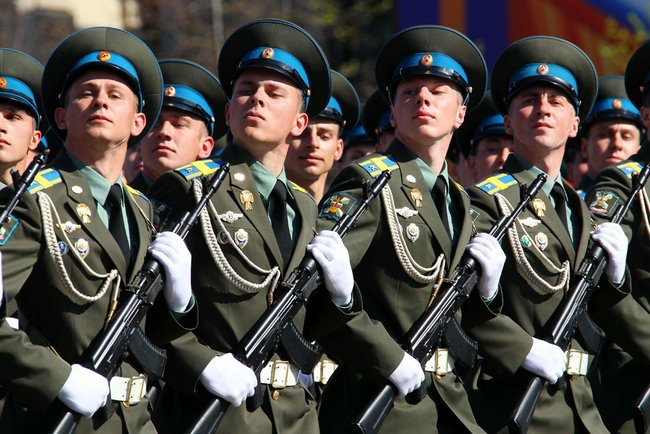
Air Force Cadets during the 2012 Moscow Victory Day Parade wearing the former dress uniform

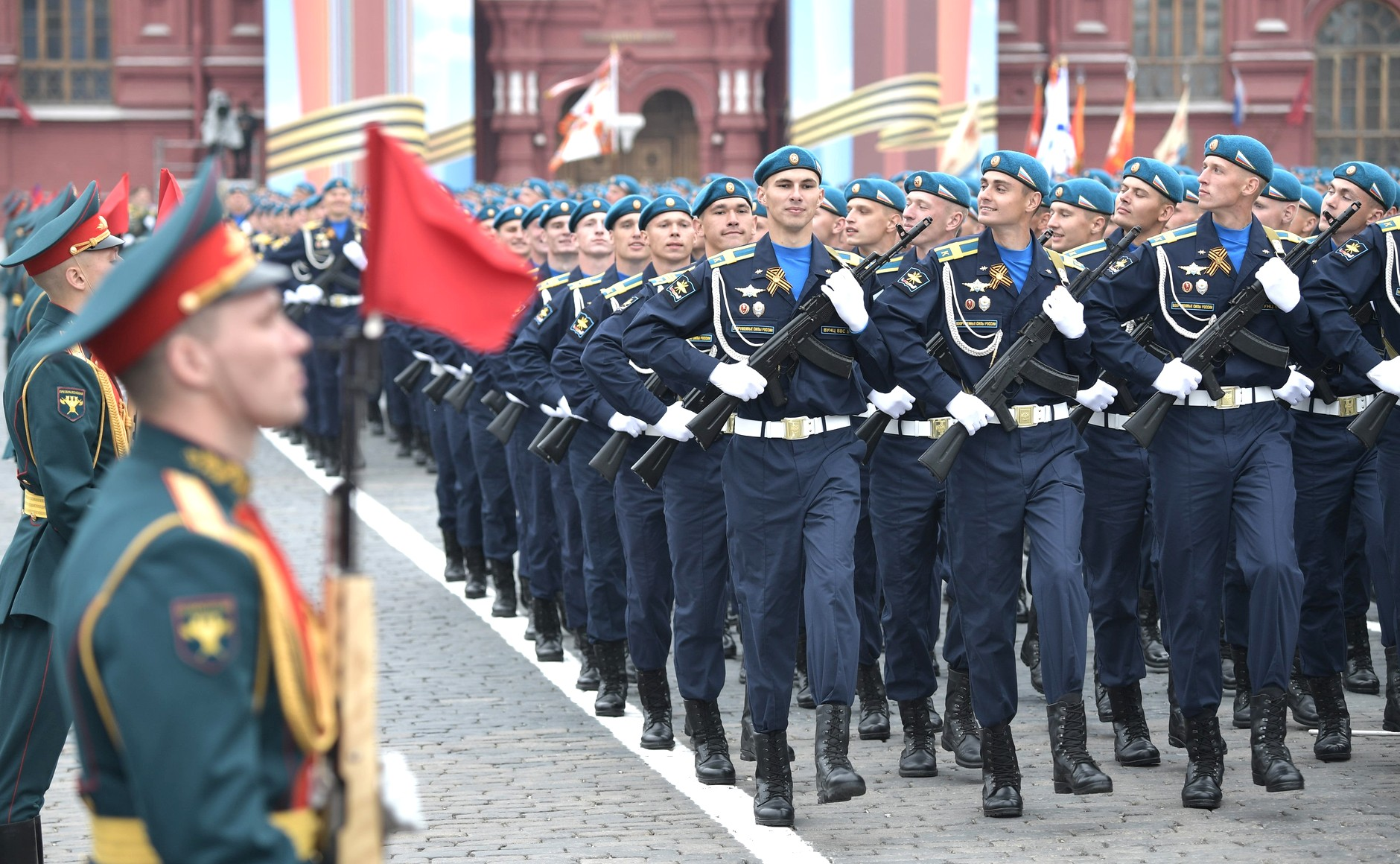
Air Force Cadets during the 2019 Moscow Victory Day Parade wearing a ceremonial version of the office uniform

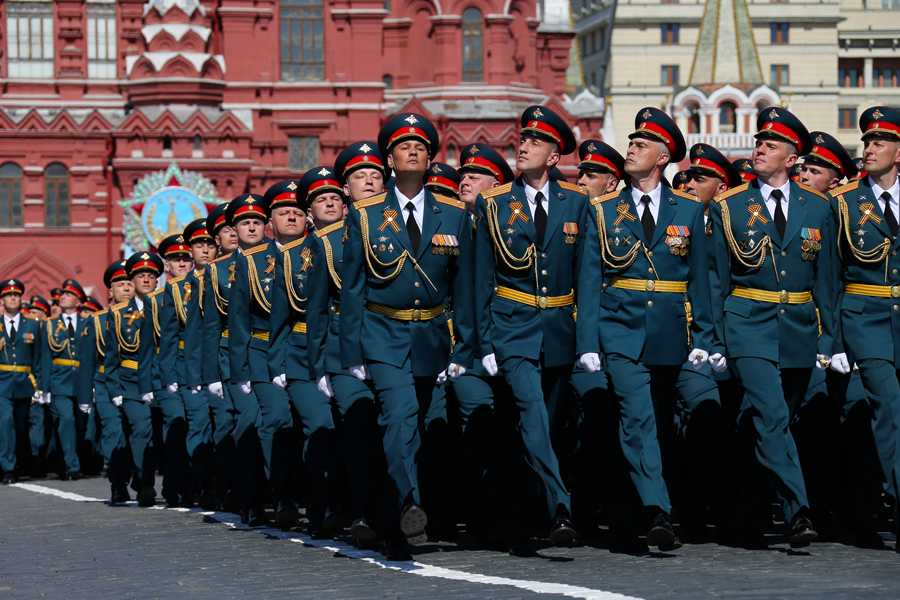
Ground Forces officers during the 2016 Moscow Victory Day Parade wearing the former open-collar parade uniforms

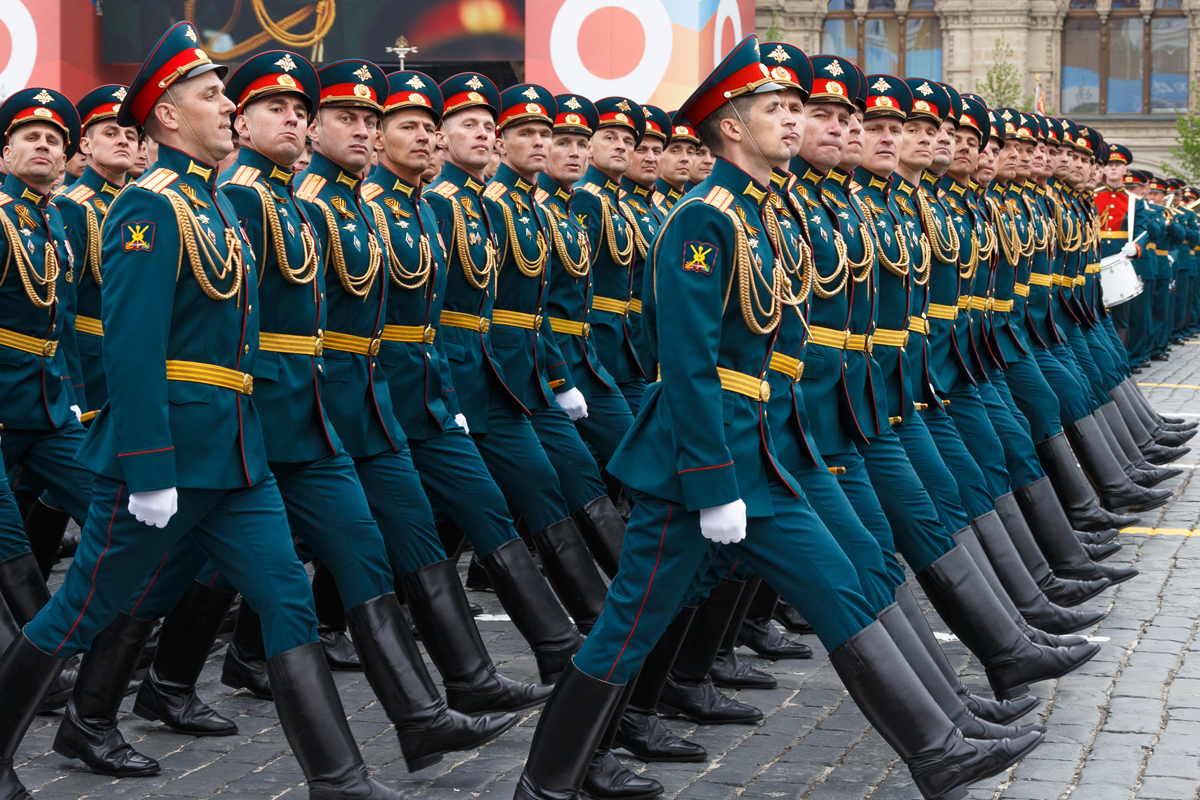
Ground Forces officers during the 2019 Moscow Victory Day Parade with the new parade tunic design and jackboots

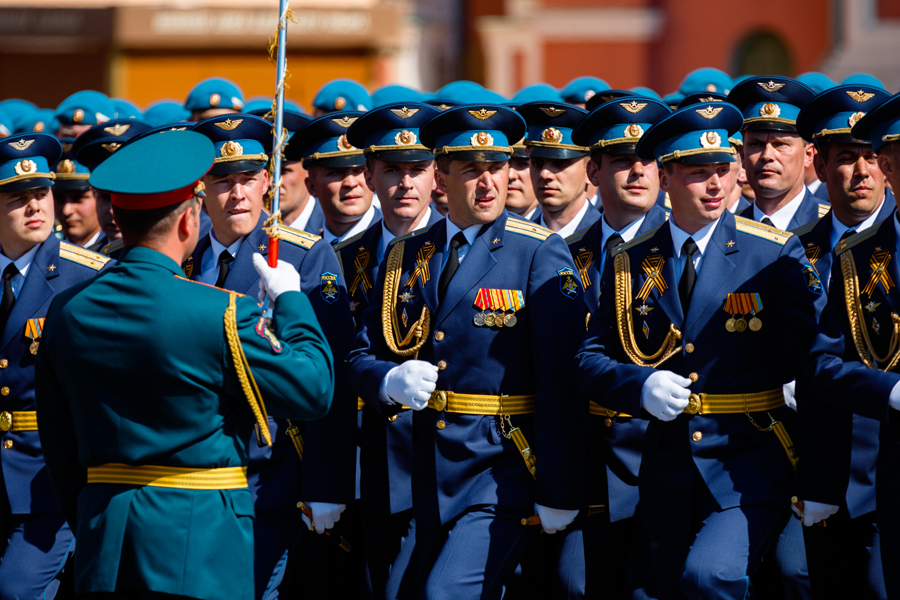
Air Force officers during the 2016 Moscow Victory Day Parade wearing the former open-collar parade uniforms

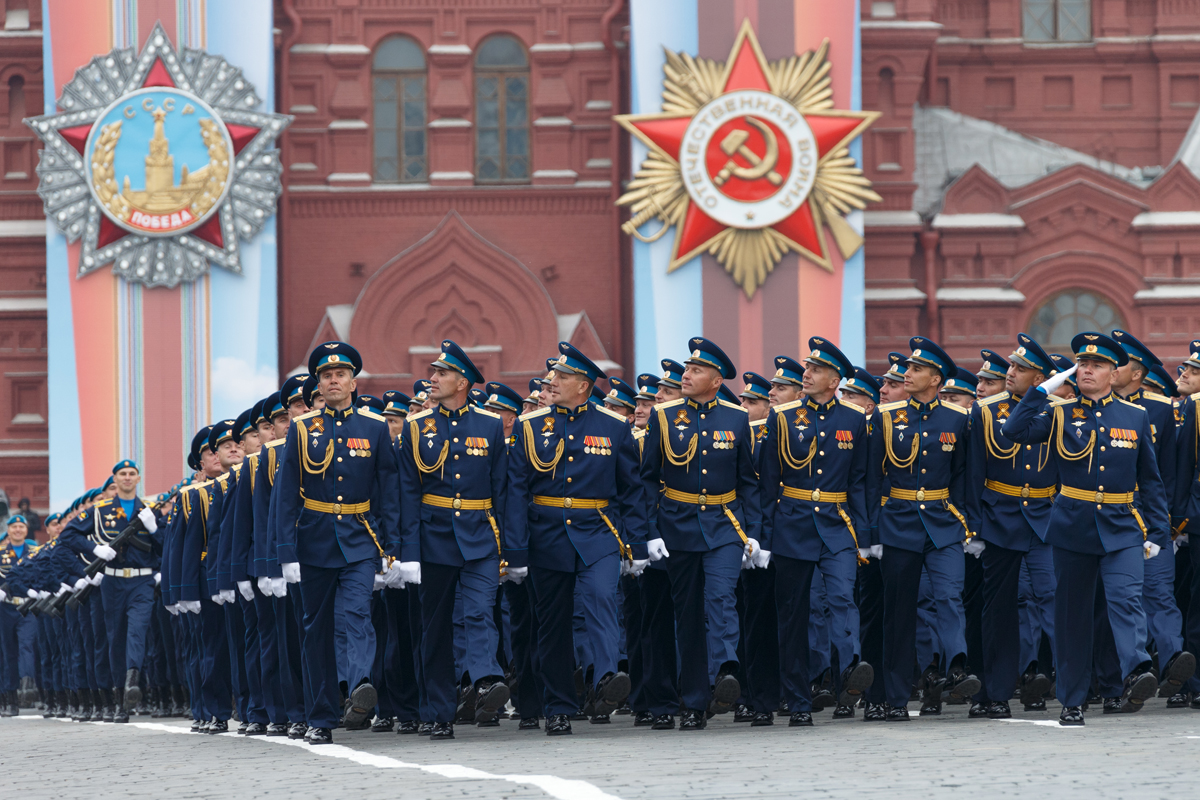
Air Force officers during the 2019 Moscow Victory Day Parade with the new ceremonial tunic design

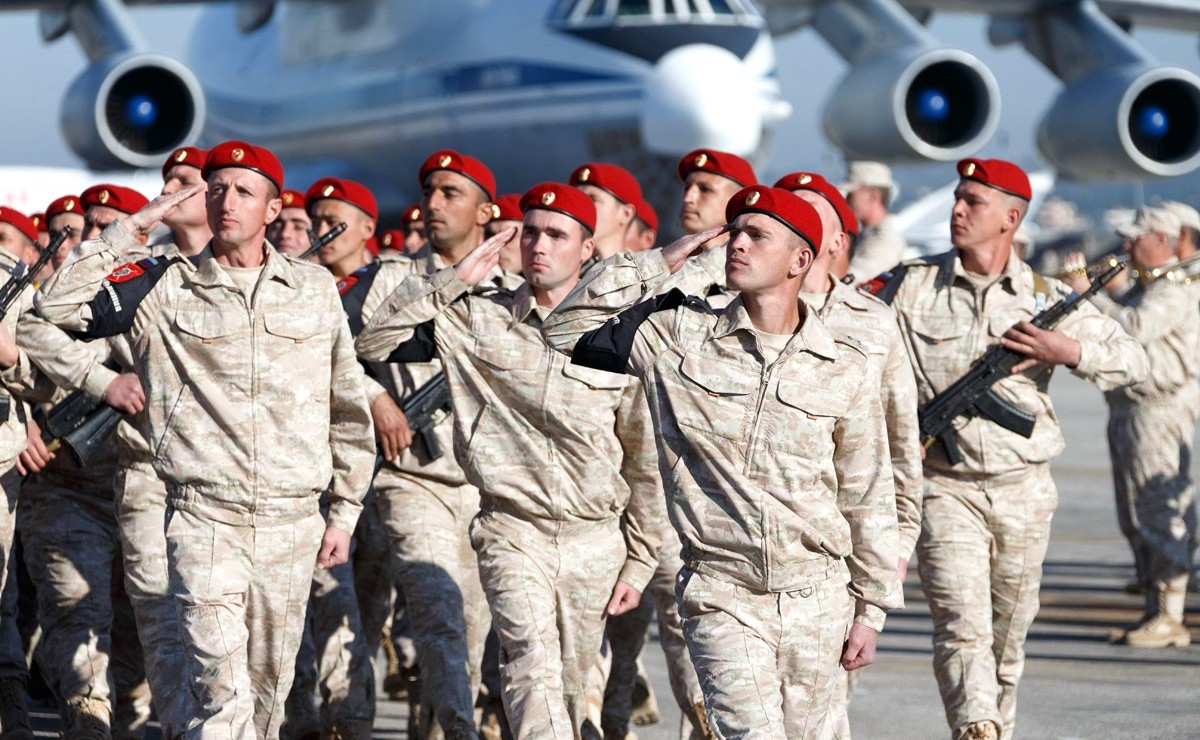
Military Police parading in the hot weather uniform at Khmeimim Air Base in Syria in 2017

== See also ==
- Military beret § Russia
- Peaked cap § Russia
- Patrol cap § Russia
- Type 07
