= Ushakov Baltic Higher Naval School =

Russian naval education institution

Coordinates: 54°44′06″N 20°29′12″E

- Балтийское высшее военно-морское училище имени Ф. Ф. Ушакова
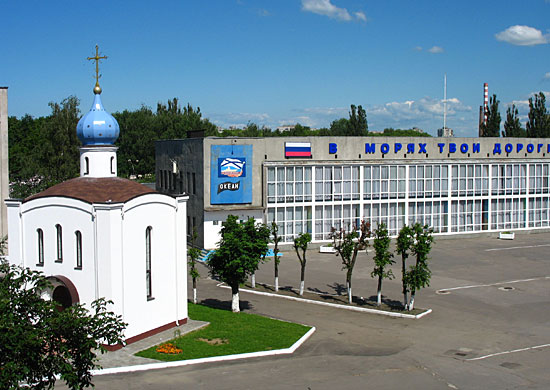
- Motto: «В морях твои дороги»
- Motto in English: "Your Roads Are in the Seas"
- Type: Military commissioning school
- Established: 1969
- President: Rear-Admiral Vyacheslav Sytnik
- Students: 2,000
- Location: Kaliningrad, Russia
- Website: https://bvvmu.mil.ru/

The Ushakov Baltic Higher Naval School, formally the Baltic Higher Naval School named after F. F. Ushakov (Russian: Балтийское высшее военно-морское училище имени Ф. Ф. Ушакова, romanized: Baltiyskoye vyssheye voyenno-morskoye uchilishche imeni F. F. Ushakova), abbreviated as BVVMU (Russian: БВВМУ) is a higher naval education institution in Kaliningrad which prepares prospective officers for commissions in the Russian Navy.

== Predecessors ==
Naval education for the Soviet Navy was established in Kaliningrad with the relocating of the Baku Naval Preparatory School to the city in 1947, following the end of the Second World War and the establishment of Soviet control. It was named the Kaliningrad Naval Preparatory School in July 1948, and was then used as the basis for the creation of the 2nd Baltic Higher Naval School on 4 August 1948. Its first intake of students began the academic year on 1 October 1948, studying 4-year training programmes for watch officers of surface ships. The school was awarded a banner and a certificate from the Presidium of the Supreme Soviet on 17 March 1949. The cadets carried out a training voyage on ships of the Baltic Fleet in April 1949, and in 1951 the school opened navigation, artillery and mine-torpedo departments. The first graduation of lieutenants took place on 2 October 1952.

In 1954, it was renamed the Baltic Higher Naval School, with the 2nd Higher Naval School of Submarine Navigation, at the time based in Riga, merged into it in 1959 to create the Baltic Higher Naval School of Submarine Navigation. This was reorganised the following year as the courses for reserve officers of the Navy, and in 1965, as the 58th naval officer courses. In 1967, the M. V. Frunze Higher Naval School in Leningrad opened a branch in Kaliningrad, with two faculties, navigation and gunnery. On 7 April 1969, this branch became the Kaliningrad Higher Naval School.

== Higher Naval School ==
The school was expanded in 1993 with the transfer of students and the faculty of surface ship armament from the Nakhimov Black Sea Higher Naval School, which had become a Ukrainian educational institution following the dissolution of the Soviet Union in 1991. This subsequently became the faculty of surface ship missile armament. In 1998 the Kaliningrad Higher Naval School was renamed the Baltic Naval Institute, receiving the honorific name of Admiral Fyodor Ushakov in 2002. A school for technicians was opened on 1 August 1999, and on 31 August 2000, so too was a cadet boarding school, named Andrei Pervozvanny Naval Cadet Corps". The school also opened the Kaliningrad regional branch of the Academy of Military Historical Sciences on 4 October 2000. In 2009, the institute was reorganised once more, becoming a branch of the Kuznetsov Naval Academy. However, by government order No. 875-R on 10 April 2023, the school was again separated from the academy. In 2013 the school graduated its first female students. On 28 March 2016 it was visited by Minister of Defence Sergei Shoigu.

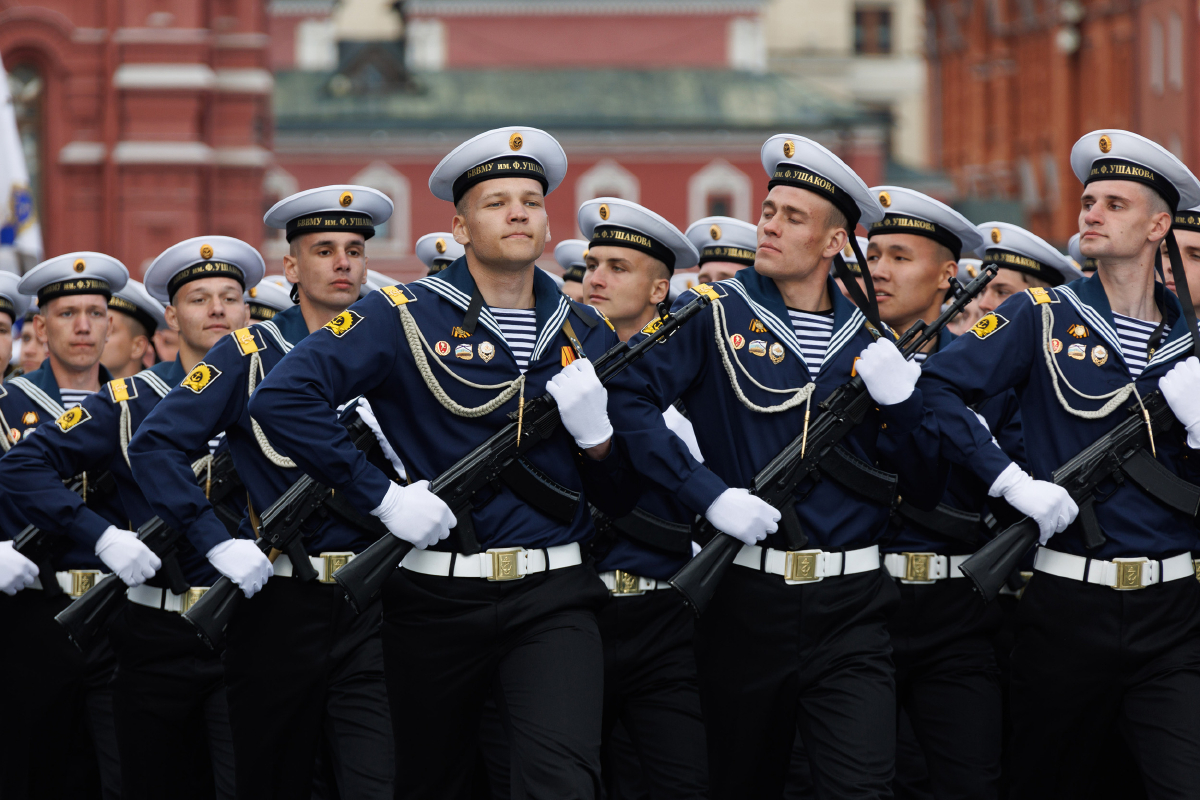
Cadets of the school march in the 2024 Moscow Victory Day Parade

The school consists of four faculties, a school of technicians, and 21 departments. Officer courses are provided, as is training for foreign specialists. There are some 250 teaching staff, with student numbers of around 2,000. By the mid-2010s, 14,500 officers had been trained over the school's existence, of whom there were 62 admirals, six Heroes of the Soviet Union and a Hero of the Russian Federation. Cadets of the school often march in the Moscow Victory Day Parade. In 2016 they made their tenth appearance, with 500 cadets participating.
