= 2016 Moscow Victory Day Parade =

Russian military parade

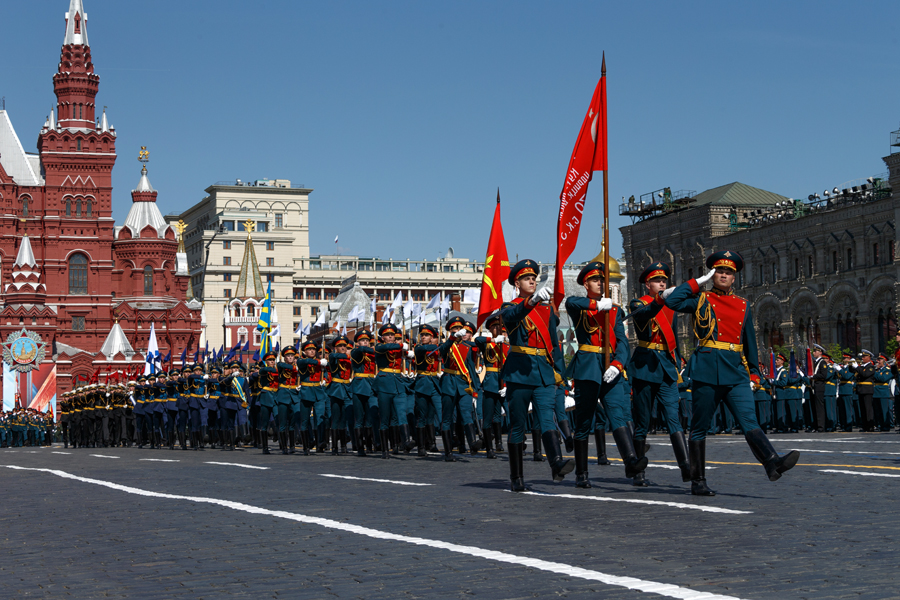
The Victory Banner in front of the parade

Vladimir Putin's speech on Red Square.

The 2016 Moscow Victory Day Parade was a military parade that took place in Red Square in Moscow on 9 May 2016 to commemorate the 71st anniversary of the capitulation of Nazi Germany in 1945. The annual parade marks the Allied victory in World War II at the Eastern Front, on the same day as the signing of the German act of capitulation to the Allies in Berlin, at midnight of 9 May 1945 (Russian time). President of the Russian Federation Vladimir Putin delivered his thirteenth holiday address to the nation on this day, right after the parade inspection that had presided over by Minister of Defense General of the Army Sergey Shoygu and led by the Commander-in-Chief of the Russian Ground Forces, Colonel General Oleg Salyukov. This was the second consecutive parade that included a moment of silence.

== Overview ==
=== Guests ===
- President Vladimir Putin
- Prime Minister Dmitry Medvedev
- President of Kazakhstan Nursultan Nazarbayev

Other guests included People's Artist of Russia Joseph Kobzon, American boxer Jeff Monson, American filmmaker Oliver Stone, and former Soviet President Mikhail Gorbachev.

=== Preparatory activities ===
Beginning in November/December 2015, preparations for the parade were well attended at the unit level. Individual unit practices were held in the various military installations for all the participating units in the national and local parades. Unit practices within Moscow Oblast itself started in early March in the Alabino field before the full blown parade practice run-throughs for all the participating units will commence.

All parade practice runs began on 26 March 2016 in Alabino with the first practice run through for the ground column, kicking off the month long national preparations for Victory Day, and will last even until the middle of April when the runs on Red Square for the national parade itself will start, ending with a final general combined practice run of the parade in early May. From the 3rd week of March up to the 3rd week of April, the Alabino military training center serves as the parade training ground for the estimated 12,000 military personnel in attendance for the Moscow parade, plus more than 175 vehicles and 80 aircraft. Also rehearsing for the parade are the massed military bands of the Armed Forces, the MVD, EMERCOM and the Moscow Garrison, all to be conducted for the 14th straight year by Lieutenant General Valery Khalilov, the Senior Director of Music of the Bands Service of the Russian Armed Forces since 2002, with a combined number of more than a thousand military bandsmen, and the world-famous Corps of Drums of the Moscow Military Music College "Field Marshal Alexander Suvorov", under the leadership of Colonel Alexander Gerasimov, the long-time college director, which has always (with a brief break from 2009 to 2011) had the traditional privilege starting 1940 of leading the parade proper, distinguished by their dark blue and red dress uniforms, snare drums and fifes, plus the color guard unit.

The 15 April practice run through in Alabino was the first to be recorded live through a drone and also the first rehearsal run-through ever to be live streamed on YouTube through RT's YouTube channel.

==== Timeline for preparatory activities in Moscow ====
- 26–28 March up to the 2nd week of April - beginning of parade practice runs in Alabino, Moscow Oblast
- 2nd up to 3rd week of April - General practice run-through in the Alabino training field, including flypast
- 4th week of April until 2 days before Victory Day - practice runs in Red Square right up to the general practice run
  - 26–30 April, 2–6 May - evening parade practice run-throughs
  - 4–5 May - Air flypast practice runs
  - 7 May - general practice run at 10am MST

=== Debut appearance of the National Guard of Russia and the Russian Aerospace Forces ===
This year's parade did, as always, featured the ODON Division which, for the very first time, marched under the banner of the newly established National Guard of Russia, created on 5 April 2016, and replaced the now defunct Internal Troops, together with the Zhukovsky - Gagarin Air Force Academy, under the banner of the 9-month old Russian Aerospace Forces founded in August 2015.

=== First ever parade to include active women in the Armed Forces ===
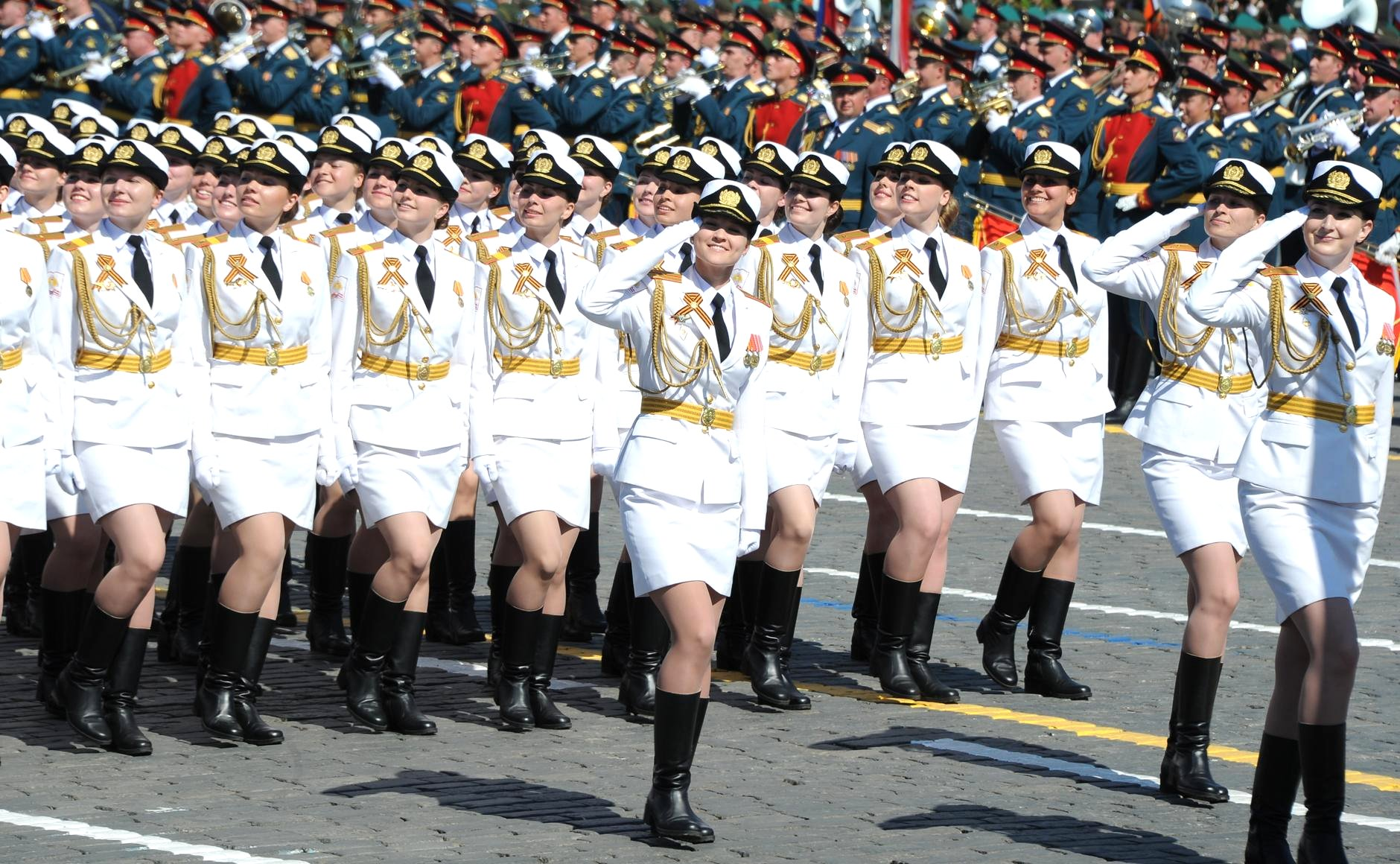
The women's contingent in the Military parade on Red Square, 9 May 2016

After the positive response and rave reviews of the first ever girls' cadet company that marched in Red Square in 2015, the 2016 parade, for the very first time, featured women officers and other ranks of the Armed Forces marching past, honoring the many women who fought during the 4-year long conflict in the battlefield and the home front. This year's first women's battalion was led by Colonel Olesya Buka (one of the longest serving female officers) and was composed of 2 companies of both lady officers, WOs and other ranks from the Military University of the Ministry of Defence of the Russian Federation and the Military Academy of Material and Technical Security "General of the Army A. V. Khrulev".

== Full order of the 2016 parade ==
Bold indicates first appearance, italic indicates multiple appearances, Bold and italic indicate returning appearance, all indicated unless otherwise noted.

- General of the Army Sergey Shoigu, Minister of Defense of the Russian Federation (parade inspector)
- Colonel General Oleg Salyukov, Commander-in-Chief of the Russian Ground Forces (parade commander)

=== Military Bands ===
- Massed Military Bands of the Armed Forces under the direction of the Senior Director of Music of the Military Bands Service of the Armed Forces of the Russian Federation, Lieutenant General Valery Khalilov
- Corps of Drums of the Moscow Military Music School

=== Ground Column ===
- 154th Preobrazhensky Independent Commandant's Regiment Colour Guard
- Honour Guard Company of the 1st Honor Guard Battalion, 154th PICR
- Suvorov Military School
- Nakhimov Naval School
- Combined Arms Academy of the Armed Forces of the Russian Federation
- Military University of the Ministry of Defence of the Russian Federation
- Military Academy of Material and Technical Security "General of the Army A. V. Khrulev"
- Zhukovsky – Gagarin Air Force Academy
- Military Space Academy "Alexander Mozhaysky"
- Baltic Naval Military Institute "Admiral Fyodor Ushakov"
- 336th Independent Guards Biaystok Marine Brigade of the Baltic Fleet
- Peter the Great Military Academy of the Strategic Missile Forces
- Ryazan Higher Airborne Command School "Gen. of the Army Vasily Margelov"'
- 98th Guards Airborne Division
- Engineering Forces, Nuclear, Biological and Chemical Defence and Control Military Academy "Marshal of the Soviet Union Semyon Timoshenko"
- 29th and 38th Independent Railway Brigades of the Russian Railway Troops
- ODON Ind. Motorized Division of the National Guard Forces Command, Federal National Guard Service of the Russian Federation "Felix Dzerzhinsky"
- Civil Defense Academy of the Ministry of Emergency Situations
- Moscow Border Guards Institute of the Federal Security Service of the Russian Federation
- 2nd Guards Tamanskaya Motor Rifle Division "Mikhail Kalinin"
- 4th Guards Kantemirovskaya Tank Division "Yuri Andropov"
- **27th Independent Guards Sevastopol Motor Rifle Brigade "60th Diamond Jubilee Anniversary of the formation of the USSR"** (returning)
- Moscow Higher Military Command School "Supreme Soviet of Russia"

=== Mobile Column ===
- T-34/85 medium tank
- GAZ-2975 "Tigr" infantry mobility vehicle
- Kornet D/EM mobile ATGM system
- Typhoon-K MRAP
- Ural Typhoon MRAP
- BTR-82AM APC
- **BMP-3** (returning)
- BMP Kurganets-25 APV and IFV
- T-15 IFV
- T-90A main battle tank
- T-14 Armata main battle tank
- 2S19 Msta-S tracked self-propelled howitzer
- 2S35 Koalitsiya-SV' tracked self-propelled howitzer
- 9K720 Iskander mobile tactical ballistic missile system
- Tor-M2U mobile SAM system on tracked chassis
- Buk-M2 mobile tracked SAM system
- S-400 mobile SAM system
- BMD-4M air-droppable IFV
- BTR-MDM "Rakushka" APC
- Pantsir-S1 mobile SAM system on wheeled chassis
- RS-24 Yars road-mobile ICBM system
- BTR Bumerang APC

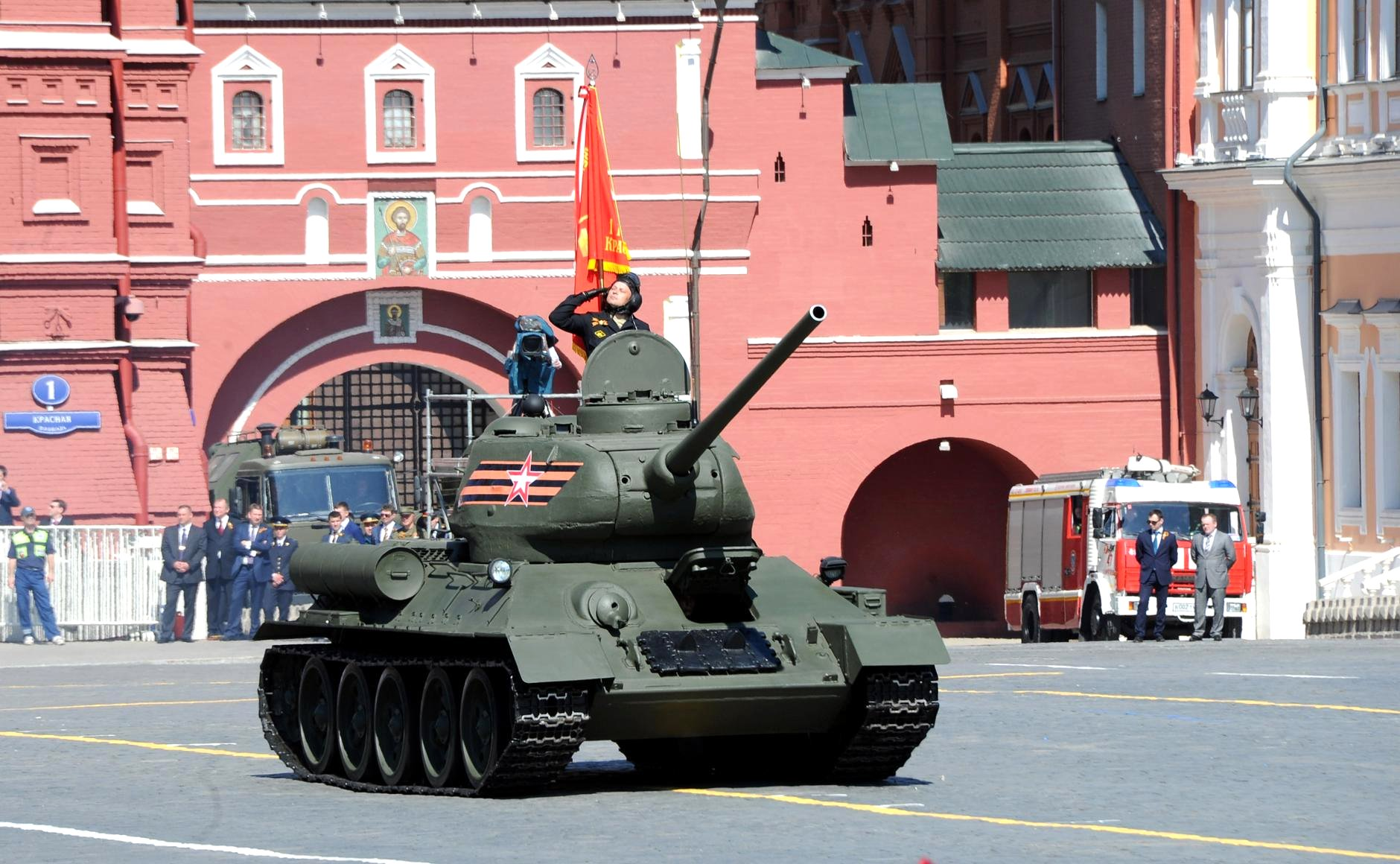
T-34

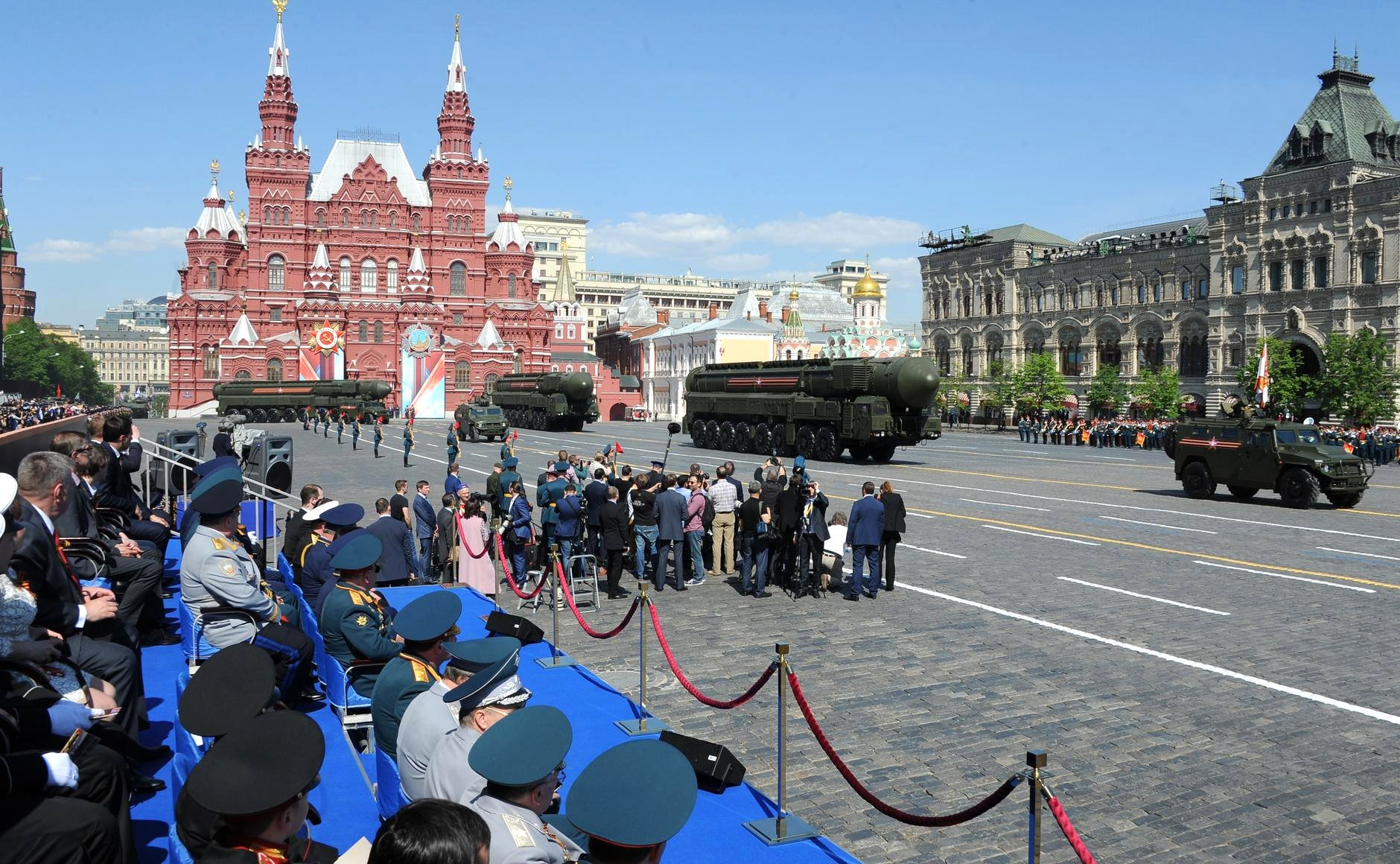
RS-24 Yars and Tigr

=== Air Fly Past Column ===
- Mil Mi-26
- Mil Mi-17
- Mil Mi-24
- Mil Mi-28
- Mil Mi-35
- Kamov Ka-52
- Kazan Ansat
- Mikoyan MiG-29
- Sukhoi Su-24
- Sukhoi Su-34
- Sukhoi Su-27
- Sukhoi Su-30
- Sukhoi Su-35
- Mikoyan MiG-31
- Ilyushin Il-76
- Ilyushin Il-78
- Tupolev Tu-22M3
- Tupolev Tu-95
- **Tupolev Tu-160BM1** (first appearance)
- Sukhoi Su-25
- Antonov An-124
- Antonov An-22
- Yakovlev Yak-130 from the new aerobatic group Crimean Wings
- Sukhoi Su-27 and Mikoyan MiG-29 of the Russian Knights and Strizhi

== Music ==
Flag procession, Review, and Address

- Sacred War (Священная Война) by Alexander Alexanderov
- Solemn Triumphal March (Торжественно-Триумфальный Марш) by Valery Khalilov
- March of the Preobrazhensky Regiment (Марш Преображенского Полка) by Unknown
- Slow March of the Officers Schools (Встречный Марш офицерских училищ) by Semyon Tchernetsky
- Slow March to Carry the War Flag (Встречный Марш для выноса Боевого Знамени) by Dmitriy Valentinovich Kadeyev
- Slow March of the Guards of the Navy (Гвардейский Встречный Марш Военно-Морского Флота) by Nikolai Pavlocich Ivanov-Radkevich
- Slow March (Встречный Марш) by Evgeny Aksyonov
- Glory (Славься) by Mikhail Glinka
- Parade Fanfare All Listen! (Парадная Фанфара “Слушайте все!”) by Andrei Golovin
- State Anthem of the Russian Federation (Государственный Гимн Российской Федерации) by Alexander Alexandrov
- Signal Retreat (Сигнал “Отбой”)

Infantry Column

- March General Miloradovich (Марш “Генерал Милорадович”) by Valery Khalilov
- Triumph of the Winners (Триумф Победителей)
- Moscow May (Москва майская) by Pokrass Brothers
- March of the Women's Brigades (Марш женских бригад) by Isaak Dunayevsky
- The Red Army is the Strongest (Красная Армия всех сильней) by Samuil Pokrass
- On Guard for the Peace (На страже Мира) by Boris Alexanderovich Diev
- Air March (Авиамарш) by Yuliy Abramovich Khait
- Embracing the Sky (Обнимая небо) by Alexandra Pakhmutova
- Legendary Sevastopol (Легендарный Севастополь) by Bano Muradeli
- Crew is One Family (Экипаж - одна семья) by Viktor Vasilyevich Pleshak
- Artillery March (Марш Артиллеристов) by Tikhon Khrennikov
- We Need One Victory (Нам Нужна Одна Победа) by Bulat Shalvovich Okudzhava
- To Serve Russia (Служить России) by Eduard Semyonovich Khanok
- Song of the Perturbed Youth (Песня о тревожной молодости) by Alexandra Pakhmutova
- We Swap Without Looking (Махнем не глядя) by Veniamin Basner
- Ballad of a Soldier (Баллада о Солдате) by Vasily Pavlovich Solovyov-Sedoy
- On the Road (В Путь) by Vasily Pavlovich Solovyov-Sedoy
- Victory Day (День Победы) by David Fyodorovich Tukhmanov

Mobile Column

- March General Miloradovich (Марш “Генерал Милорадович”) by Valery Khalilov
- Invincible and Legendary (Несокрушимая и легендарная) by Alexander Alexandrov
- In Defence of the Motherland (В защиту Родины) by Viktor Runov
- March Three Tankmen (Марш “Три Танкиста”) by Pokrass Brothers
- March of the Soviet Tankists (Марш сове́тских танки́стов) by Pokrass Brothers
- Katyusha (Катюша) by Matvey Blanter
- March Hero (Марш “Герой”) by Unknown
- March Victory (Марш “Победа”) by Albert Mikhailovich Arutyunov
- Long Live our State (Да здравствует наша держава) by Boris Alexandrov

Air Column

- Air March (Авиамарш) by Yuliy Abramovich Khait
- Embracing the Sky (Обнимая небо) by Alexandra Pakhmutova
- March Airplanes – First of all (Марш “Первым делом самолёты”) by Vasili-Solovyov-Sedoi
- I Believe, Friends (Я верю, друзья) by Oskar Feltsman
- Air March (Авиамарш) by Yuliy Abramovich Khait
- Embracing the Sky (Обнимая небо) by Alexandra Pakhmutova

Conclusion

- We are the Army of the People (Мы Армия Народа) by Georgy Viktorovich Mavsesya
- Farewell of Slavianka (Прощание Славянки) by Vasiliy Agapkin

== Other parades ==
As per tradition, 26 other Russian major cities (Sevastopol and Kerch in the disputed Crimea included) held their parades on this day, and joint civil-military parades were hosted by 50 other towns and cities nationwide. Parades were also held in both the pro-Russian territories in eastern Ukraine (the Donetsk People's Republic and the Luhansk People's Republic, both featuring the United Armed Forces of Novorossiya and the republican MVD and EMERCOM units).

Kazakhstan did not hold any parades this year (either on this day or on 7 May), but Belarus carried on with the annual veterans' parade on this day in Minsk, Ukraine held its usual parade and Military tattoo in Kyiv after a 6-year break.

== See also ==
- Moscow Victory Parade of 1945
- Victory Day (9 May)
