= 2020 Moscow Victory Day Parade =

Russian military parade

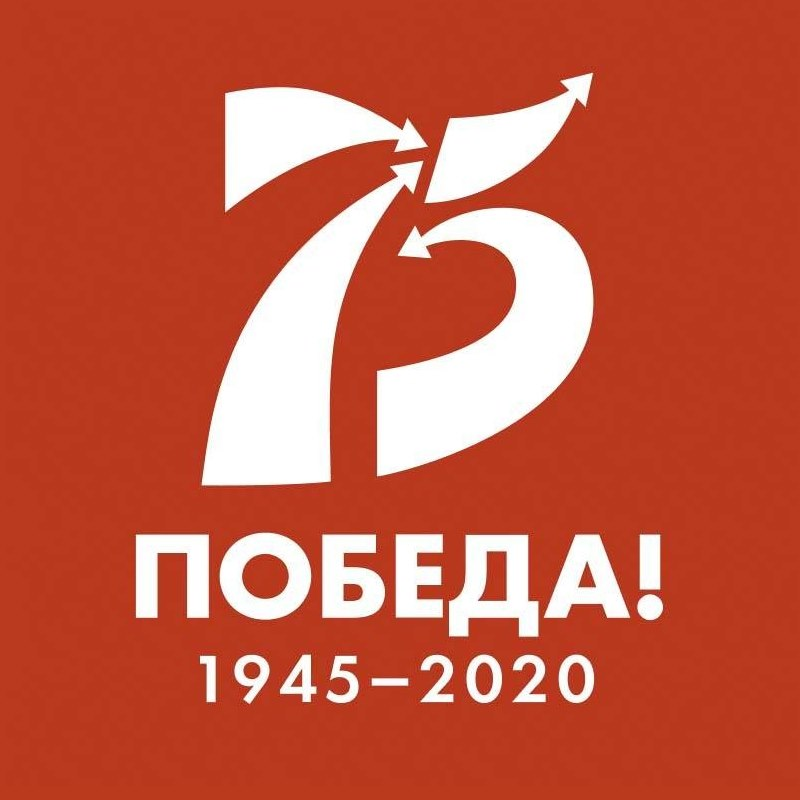
Emblem of the 75th anniversary Victory Day Parade

Full version of the 2020 Moscow Victory Day Parade.

The 2020 Moscow Victory Day Parade was a military parade that took place in Moscow's Red Square on 24 June 2020 to commemorate the 75th Diamond Jubilee of both the capitulation of Nazi Germany in the Second World War in 1945 and the historic Moscow Victory Parade of 1945.

For the first time since the collapse of the Soviet Union and the resumption of military parades in 1995, this is the first parade to be cancelled on a holiday itself. Originally scheduled to take place on May 9, the Kremlin decided to postpone the parade to a later date amid the COVID-19 pandemic in the country. Close to 3.6 million Muscovites watched the live broadcast of the parade.

== Events ==
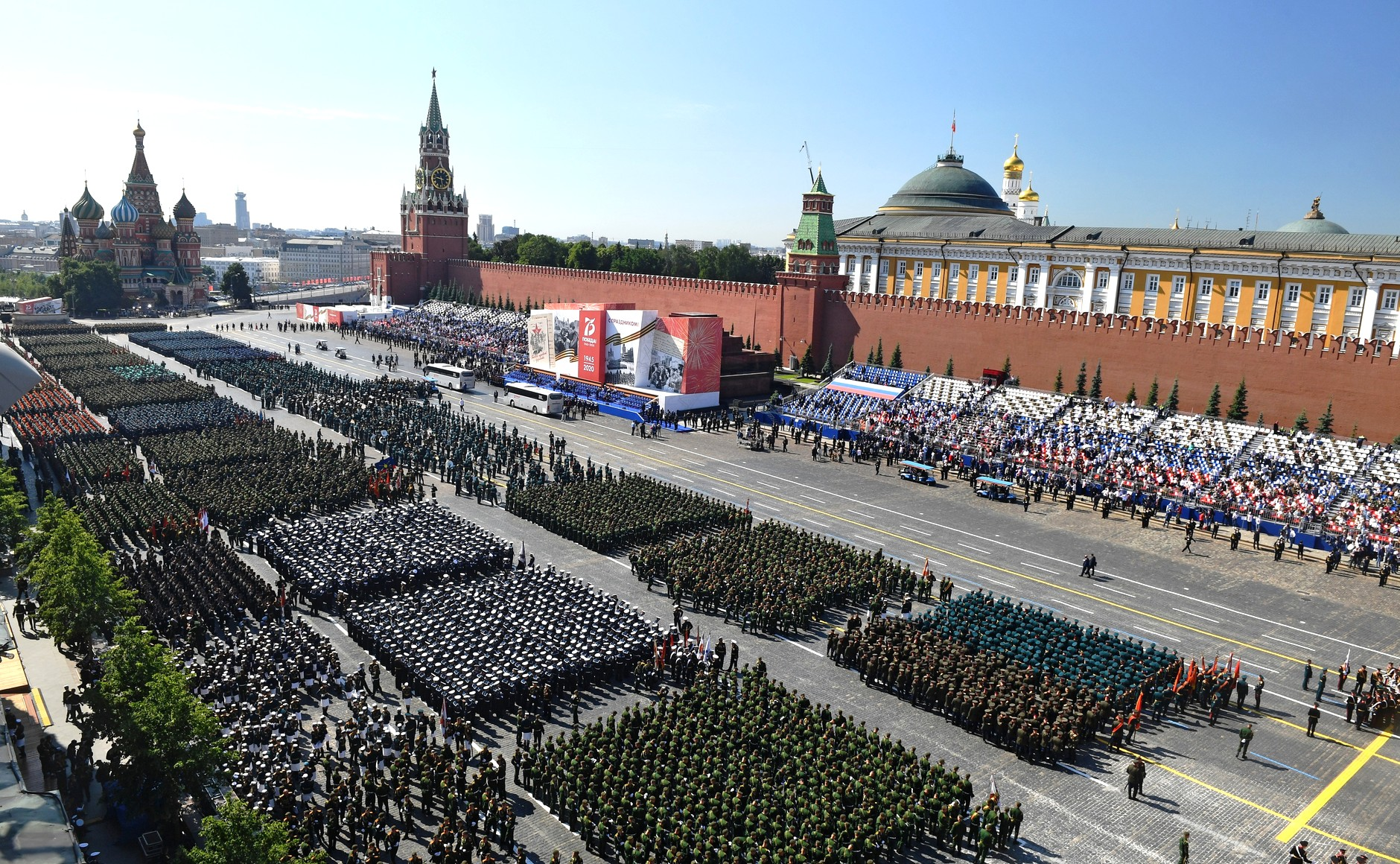
The regiments prepare for the Victory Day Parade

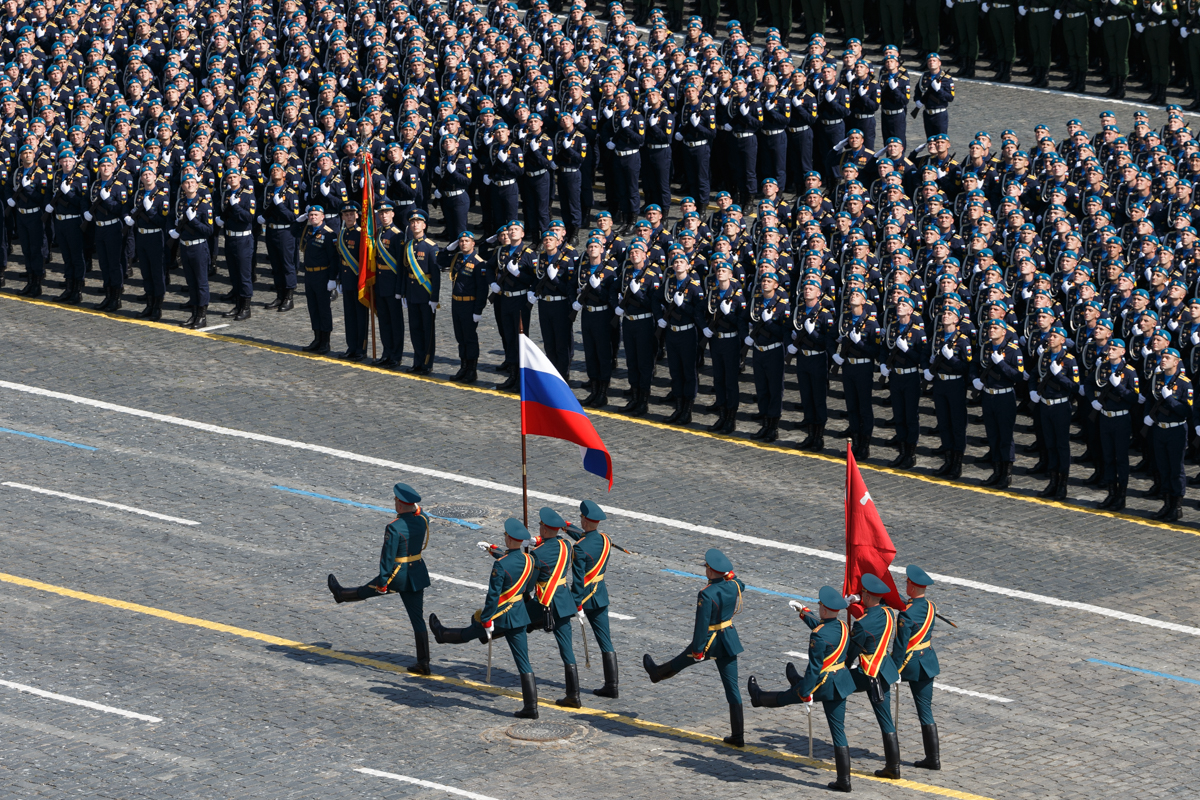
Start of the parade.

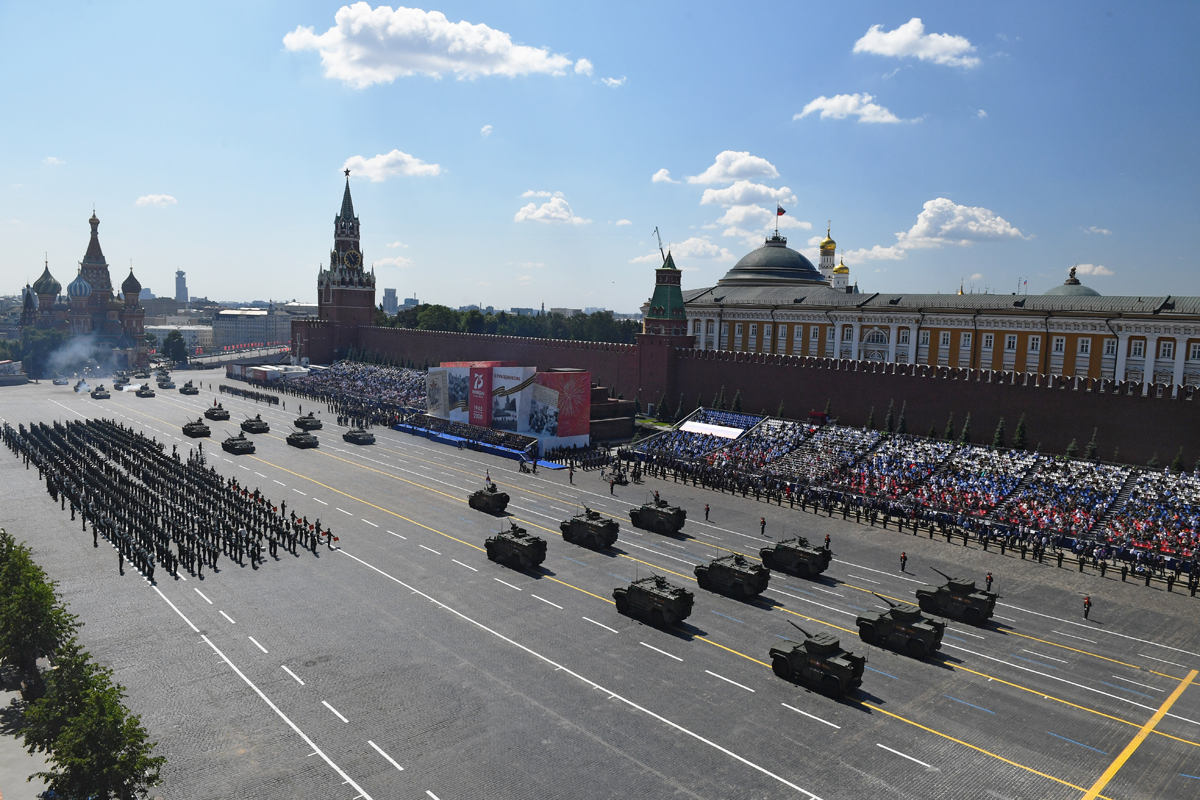
Military equipment.

Russian President Vladimir Putin delivered his seventeenth holiday address to the nation after the parade inspection presided over by Minister of Defense General of the Army Sergey Shoygu, accompanied by the parade commander General of the Army Oleg Salyukov, Commander-in-Chief of the Ground Forces, who will be in the parade for the seventh consecutive year. The ceremonies honoured the 1945 parade, with the bands playing the Jubilee Slow March "25 Years of the Red Army" at the outset of the inspection stage. Every year, for several days of Victory Day celebrations, a dress rehearsal of the Parade is held in the Armed Forces' Alabino Training Range in Moscow Oblast, which exactly repeats the holiday program itself. On this day, huge columns of military personnel, cadets and representatives of law enforcement agencies, legendary and modern military equipment take to the streets, and dozens of modern planes and helicopters appear in the skies above the federal capital. All actions of rehearsal participants are usually so coordinated that what is happening is called a mini-parade.

For the first time, 20 samples of the latest armoured and aviation equipment, including the Kurganets-25 infantry fighting vehicles and the latest S-300V4 and S-350 air defense systems, took part in the parade which involved 1,250 bandsmen, an estimated 16,000 personnel in the ground column, 4,500 in the mobile column of around 250 plus vehicles (including historical vehicles from the Second World War), and 600 aircraft crew personnel of the 80-strong flypast.

=== Foreign troops ===
Participants of the Victory Day parade 24 June 2020 versus 9 May 2015

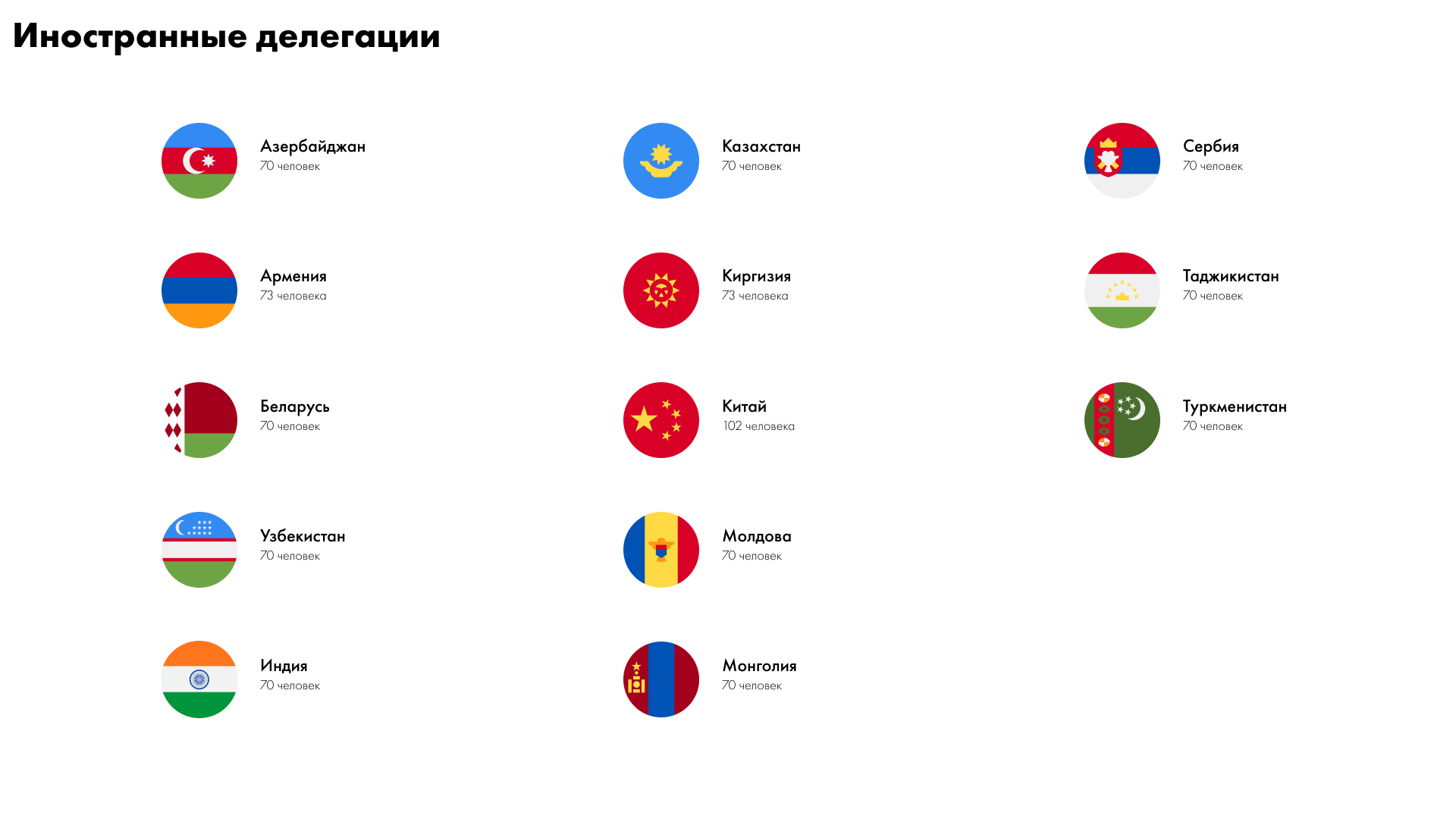
A schematic of the foreign troops in the parade.

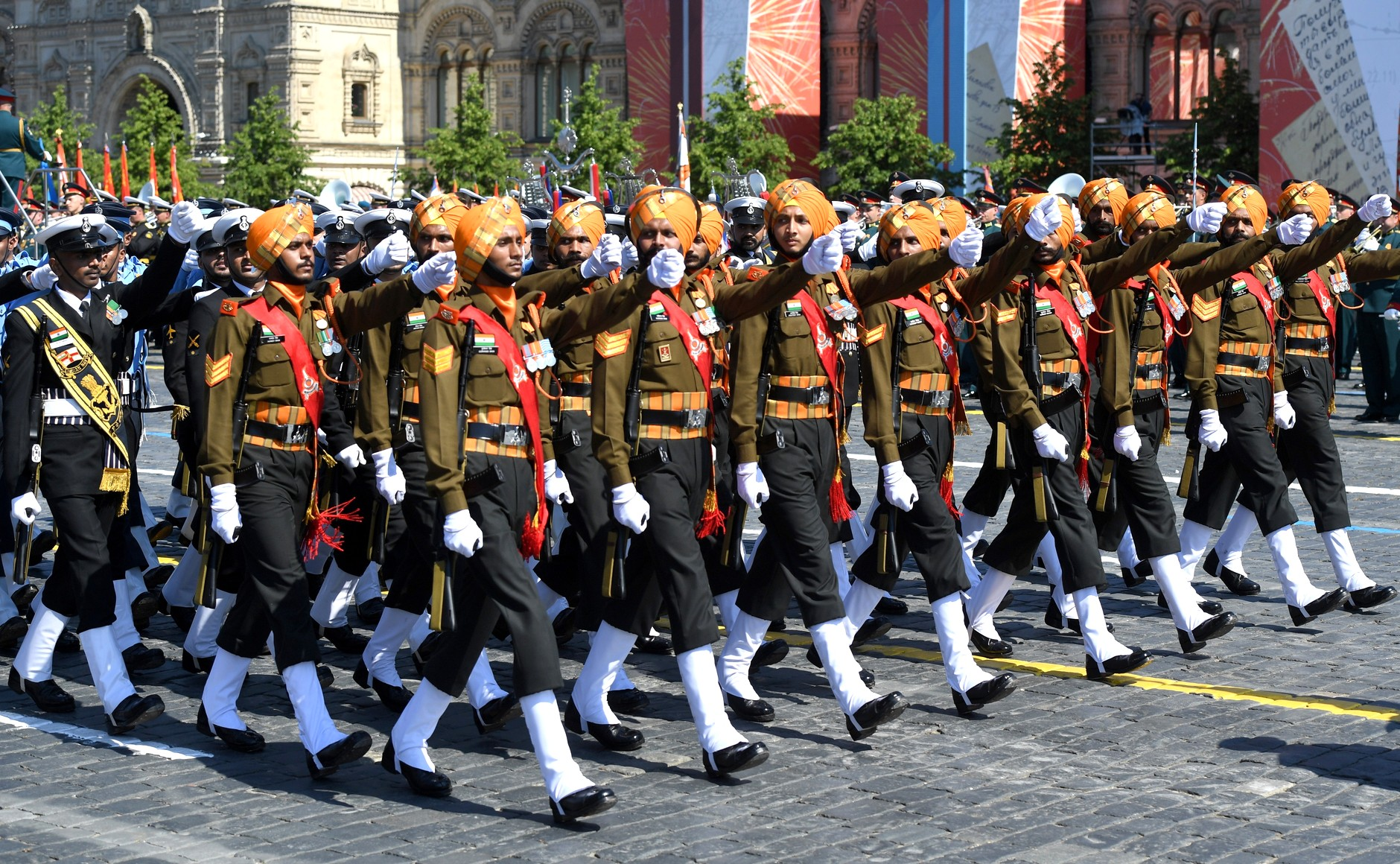

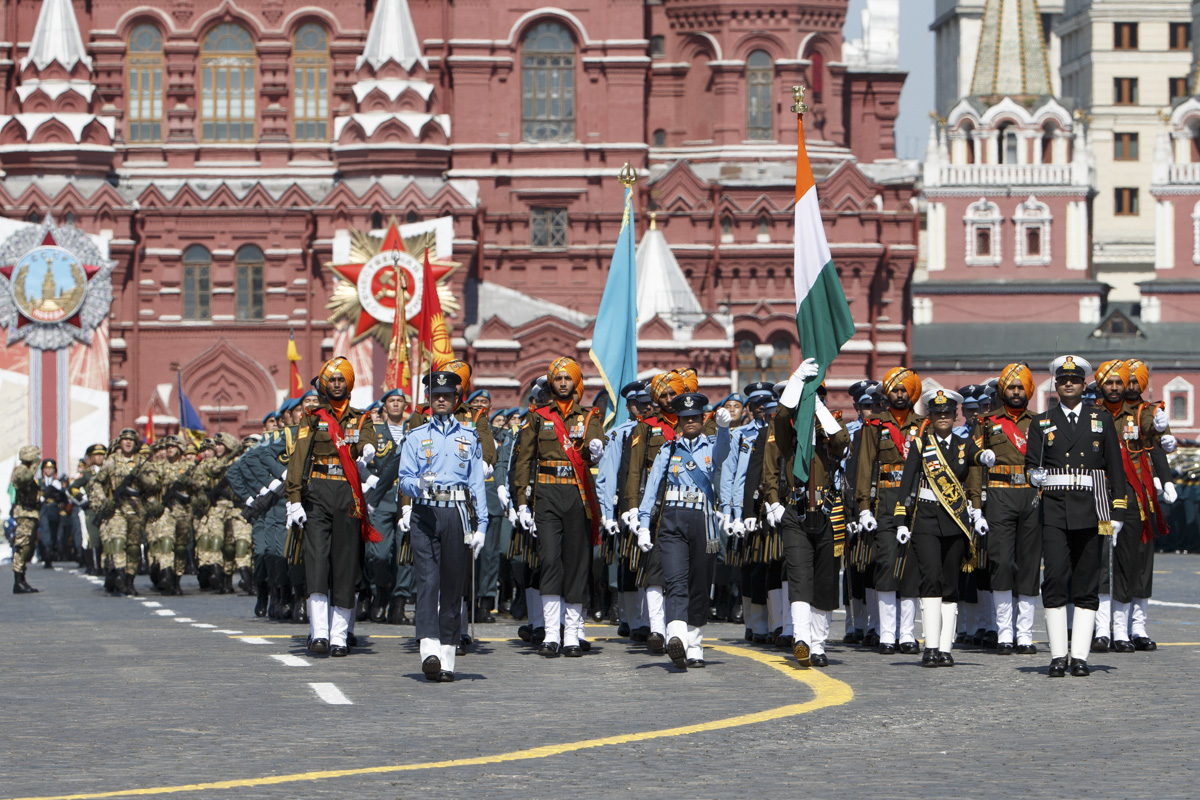
Troops of the 'Tri-Services Guard of Honour' company, of the Indian Armed Forces, in the parade.

In addition to troops from the Russian Armed Forces, contingents from 20 foreign countries were also planned be on parade, groups from the Commonwealth of Independent States (CIS), as well as contingents from China, India, Serbia, France, the United Kingdom, United States, Poland and Mongolia, returning after a 5 to 10-year hiatus. Parade groups from Belarus, Egypt, Israel, and Iran were planned to be invited. Many of these plans however were scratched in light of the COVID-19 pandemic. The original contingent from Kyrgyzstan was supposed to be provided by the Honour Guard of the National Guard of Kyrgyzstan. However, this was scrapped after it became known that one of its members had become infected with the coronavirus. A contingent from the General Staff represented the country in their place. Days before the parade, it was reported that multiple members of the Belarusian contingent had become ill with the coronavirus.

The Turkmen contingent consisted of two color guards (one carrying the Flag of Turkmenistan and the other carrying the combat flag of the 748th Infantry Regiment of the 206th Rifle Division) riding in two GAZ-M20 Pobeda cars brought in from the Turkmen capital. After their appearance, the contingent were quarantined at a hospital in Turkmenabad. Other Red Army banners that were carried by foreign contingents included the banners of the 89th Rifle Division, the 8th Guards Motor Rifle Division, the Zheleznyak Partisan Detachment, and three units who participated in the Minsk Offensive.

== Invited attendees ==
=== Summary ===
The first official invitations came during the 2019 G20 Osaka summit, with invitations going to US President Donald Trump, French president Emmanuel Macron, German chancellor Angela Merkel and Chinese leader Xi Jinping. The invitation to President Trump was reiterated in a phone call with Putin later that year. However, President Trump would later decline the invitation in a diplomatic cable to Moscow, sending National Security Advisor (United States) Robert O'Brien, to attend on his behalf.) In December 2019, an official invitation was sent to President Recep Tayyip Erdogan of Turkey by the Russian Embassy in Ankara. President Putin has also at various times invited multiple heads of state from the CIS and the CSTO.

In January 2020, former Polish President Lech Wałęsa expressed a willingness to come to Moscow for the parade if he received an invitation. In an interview with an Estonian news agency, Estonian Defence Minister Jüri Luik alluded to the parade by saying that he would not recommend that President Kersti Kaljulaid visit on such an occasion. United Nations General Assembly President Tijjani Muhammad-Bande said in an interview to Sputnik that he would be "honored" to attend the parade if invited. In early June 2020, despite having accepted the invitation earlier this year, Prime Minister of Japan Shinzo Abe announced that he will skip the parade due to the 46th G7 summit (which was itself rescheduled).

As of 14 June 2020, a total of 31 foreign heads of state and government, along with 4 multilateral leaders, had accepted the invitation to this year's parade. However, following the rescheduling of the event to 24 June 2020, more than two-thirds of the leaders had withdrawn their invitation (mostly due to scheduling conflicts and COVID-19 pandemic restrictions). The Foreign Minister of Russia Sergei Lavrov said that 12 heads of state had confirmed their attendance to the rescheduled event.

=== Guest list ===
==== Original composition ====
Over 30 guests accepted the invitation to the 2020 parade. However, most of them had done this before the postponement (abide to the original 9 May schedule). The following names indicate leaders either who did not reconfirm their attendance to the rescheduled 24 June parade or leaders who reconfirmed but decided to cancel their attendance the week prior to the parade:

- Prime Minister of Armenia Nikol Pashinyan (cancelled due to COVID-19 restrictions)
- President of Austria Alexander Van der Bellen
- President of Azerbaijan Ilham Aliyev (cancelled due to COVID-19 restrictions)
- President of Bulgaria Rumen Radev
- President of Croatia Zoran Milanović (cancelled due to issues with plane)
- President of Cuba Miguel Diaz-Canel
- President of the Czech Republic Miloš Zeman (cancelled due to COVID-19 restrictions)
- President of Egypt Abdel Fattah el-Sisi
- President of France Emmanuel Macron
- Prime Minister of India Narendra Modi
- Prime Minister of Israel Benjamin Netanyahu and Alternate Prime Minister Benny Gantz (cancelled due to the political situation in Israel)
- Prime Minister of Italy Giuseppe Conte
- Prime Minister of Japan Shinzo Abe (cancelled due to the 46th G7 summit, and then COVID-19 restrictions)
- Grand Duke of Luxembourg Henri
- President of Mongolia Khaltmaagiin Battulga (cancelled due to the 2020 Mongolian legislative election, which was held on the same day)
- President of North Macedonia Stevo Pendarovski
- President of Palestine Mahmood Abbas (cancelled due to political situation in the Middle East)
- President of Turkey Recep Tayyip Erdoğan
- President of Turkmenistan Gurbanguly Berdimuhamedow (cancelled due to COVID-19 restrictions he would have to take in relation to his 63rd birthday five days after the parade)
- National Security Advisor of the United States Robert C. O'Brien
- President of Venezuela Nicolas Maduro
- President of Vietnam Nguyễn Phú Trọng (cancelled due to COVID-19 restrictions)

Among those who were also invited were United States Secretary of Defense Mark Esper.

==== Final list ====
The following is a list of leaders who confirmed their attendance to the 24 June parade. The guest list includes 10 heads of state and government of different European and Asian nations, among other heads of international organizations. Many foreign leaders who could not attend the 24 June parade sent their defense or foreign ministers as well as ambassadors to the parade in their place:

- President of Abkhazia Aslan Bzhania
- (Algeria) Chief of Staff of the Algerian People's National Army Major General Saïd Chengriha
- Minister of Defence of Armenia David Tonoyan
- Minister of Defence of Azerbaijan Colonel General Zakir Hasanov
- President of Belarus Aleksander Lukashenko
- Serb Member of the Presidency of Bosnia and Herzegovina Milorad Dodik
- Minister of National Defense of the People's Republic of China General Wei Fenghe
- (Czech Republic) Czech Ambassador Vítězslav Pivoňka
- Ambassador of Egypt Ihab Nasr
- (France) French Ambassador Pierre Lévy
- (Germany) German Ambassador Géza Andreas von Geyr
- Foreign Minister of Hungary Péter Szijjártó
- Minister of Defence of India Rajnath Singh
- Minister of Defence of Indonesia Lieutenant General Prabowo Subianto
- President of Kazakhstan Kassym-Jomart Tokayev
- President of Kyrgyzstan Sooronbay Jeenbekov (Note: Despite already being in Moscow to attend the parade, Kyrgyz president Sooronbay Jeenbekov returned to Bishkek at last minute after COVID-19 cases were detected in his delegation.)
- President of Moldova Igor Dodon
- Commander-in-Chief of the Myanmar Armed Forces Senior General Min Aung Hlaing
- President of Serbia Aleksandar Vučić
- President of South Ossetia Anatoly Bibilov
- President of Tajikistan Emomali Rahmon
- Minister of Defence of Turkmenistan Major General Begench Gundogdyev
- (United States) Ambassador of USA John J. Sullivan
- President of Uzbekistan Shavkat Mirziyoyev
- Minister of Foreign Affairs of Venezuela Jorge Arreaza
- (Commonwealth of Independent States) Secretary General of CIS Sergei Lebedev
- Secretary-General of the Collective Security Treaty Organization Stanislav Zas
- (Eurasian Economic Union) Chairman of the Eurasian Economic Commission Mikhail Myasnikovich

Other foreign guests included Serbian filmmaker and actor Emir Kusturica.

== Preparation ==
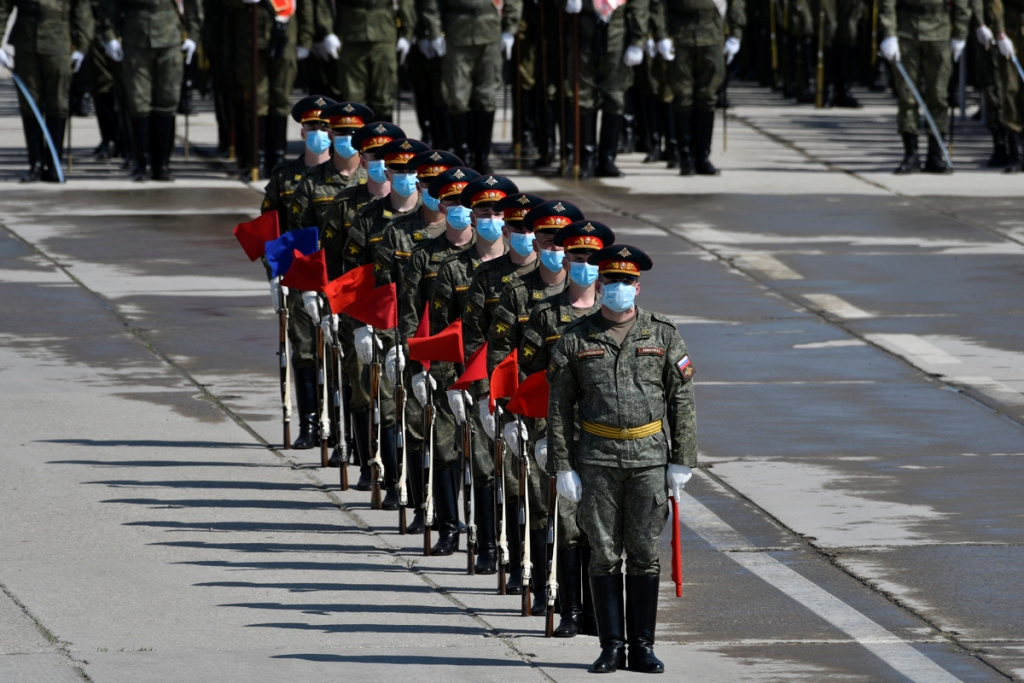
Soldiers wearing face masks during the rehearsal.

Since November 2019, preparations for the parade had been ongoing at the unit level. Individual and unit practices were held in the various unit locations. In March 2020 the days of full parade rehearsal and practice run throughs at the training center at Alabino, Moscow Oblast formally commenced the national preparations for the diamond jubilee celebrations, with the ground and mobile columns first to take their practice rounds in front of the national and international press representatives. The flypast segment of the parade began its preparations in early June just weeks before the main parade itself, first in Kubinka airfield and later on joining the Alabino run-through.

=== Timeline for preparatory activities in Moscow ===
- 24 March towards 14 April – beginning of parade practice runs in Alabino, Moscow Oblast (cut short due to the decision to postpone the parade, set to be resumed before the end of May)
- 8 June up to 14 June – General practice run-through in the Alabino training field, including flypast
- 17 and 18 June - evening parade practice run-throughs at Red Square
- 20 June – the general parade practice run at 10 AM MST, including flypast

== Impact of the COVID-19 pandemic ==
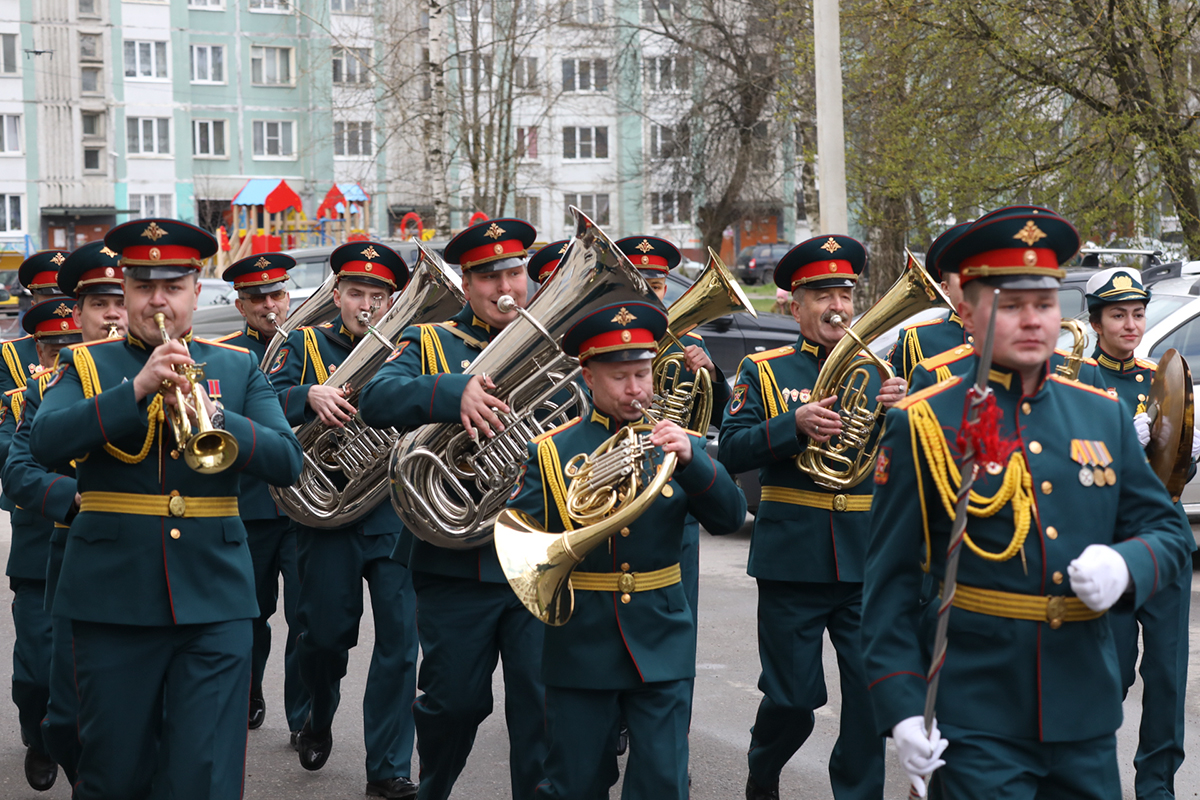
A military band during a local "personal parade".

As the parade practice runs began on 24–25 March in Alabino, the COVID-19 pandemic affected the preparations for the parade heavily. The Moscow city government proposed holding the parade without any spectators for the sake of public health, especially of the Second World War veterans and their families who were a big part of the audience in the past. Only select reporters and cameramen of Russian TV channels, as well as the press personnel of the Ministry of Defence, stayed there to cover the proceedings. Alternative proposals were also discussed, including the postponement of the parade to 24 June (anniversary of the Moscow Victory Day Parade of 1945), 2 September (Victory over Japan Day), or 7 November in replacement of the Memorial Parade in honor of the anniversary of the 1941 October Revolution Parade. The former was sponsored in the State Duma by A Just Russia leader Sergey Mironov. 24 June was announced as the new date for the parade in a video conference on 26 May. Presidential Spokesman Dmitry Peskov announced that the government expected the situation to improve further before that date. Two days later, the corresponding executive order was signed.

=== Postponement and replacement celebrations on 9 May ===
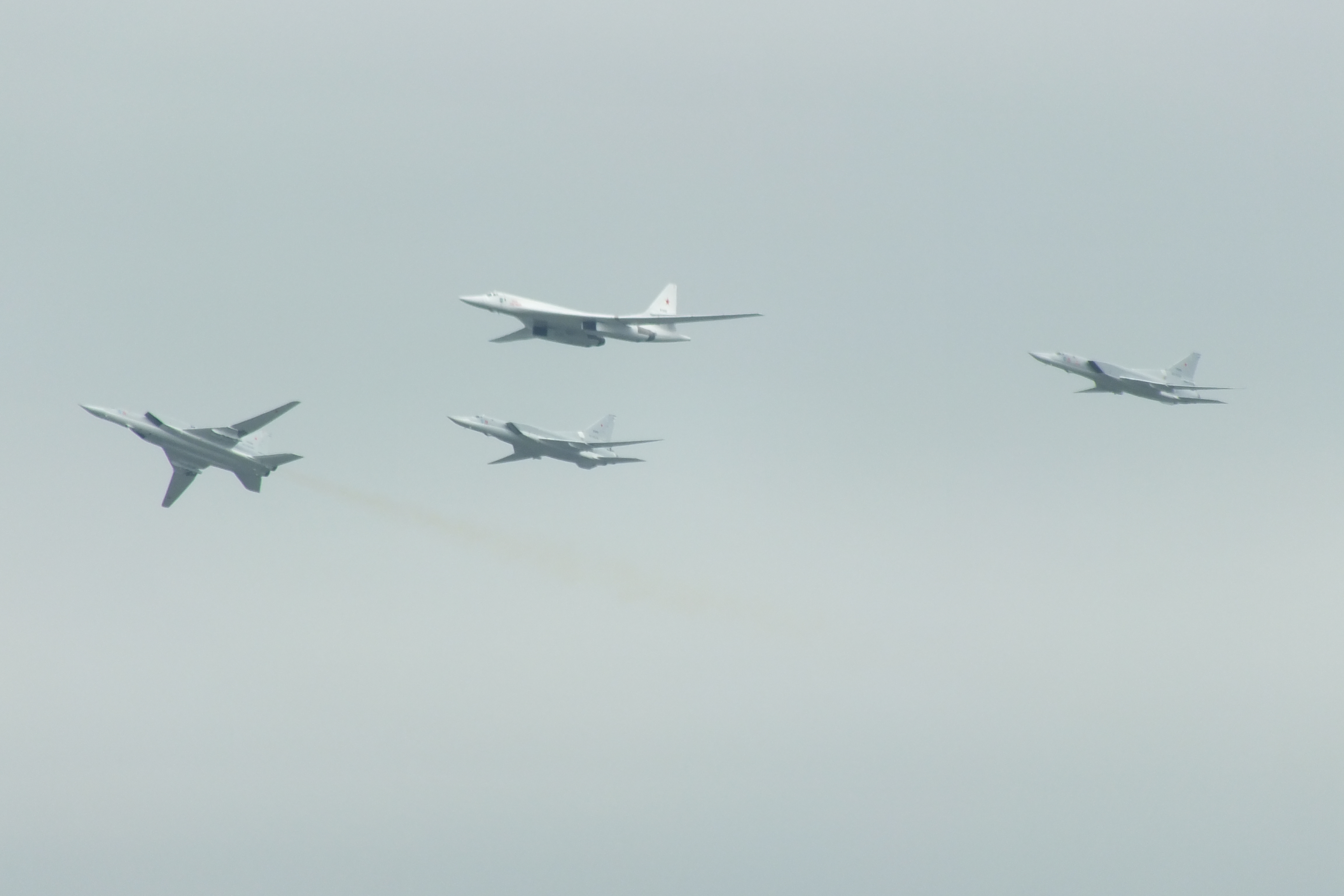
Flypast over Moscow on 9 May, 10:28 (local time)

On 16 April 2020, President Vladimir Putin announced the postponement of the Victory Day parade, which is supposed to be held on 9 May. The day before, representatives of Russian veterans associations asked Putin to postpone the celebrations to a later date. The Immortal Regiment march, which is supposed to be held on the same day, has also been postponed. On April 28, President Putin announced that an air military parade would be held on 9 May in Moscow as well as in other cities of Russia. Two days later, an official in the Western Military District announced that an air show would also be held at the Kubinka air base. Many veterans had their very own "personal parades", being organized at their homes by soldiers of local military units.

On the morning of 9 May, Putin inspected a small parade of the Kremlin Regiment of the Federal Protective Service at Cathedral Square of the Moscow Kremlin. He then went to the Tomb of the Unknown Soldier to attend a wreath laying ceremony.

== Full order of the 2020 parade ==
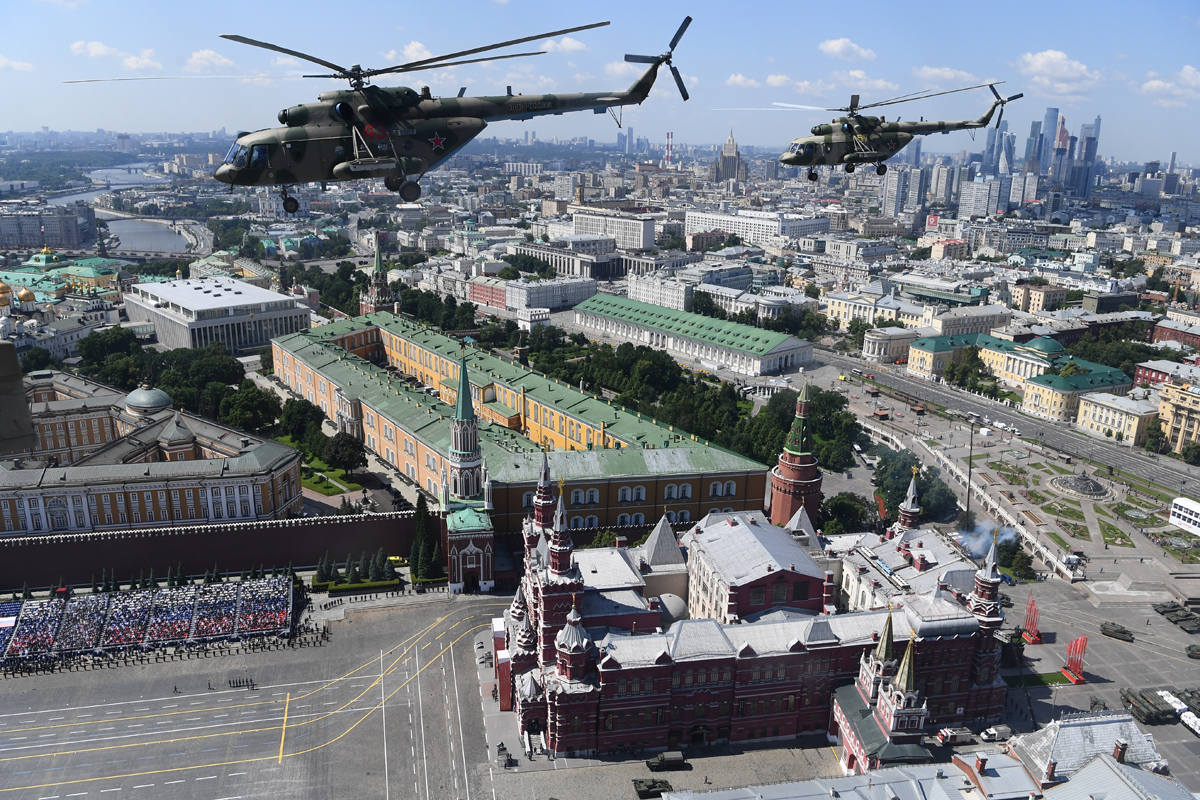
Mi-8 helicopters in fly-past.

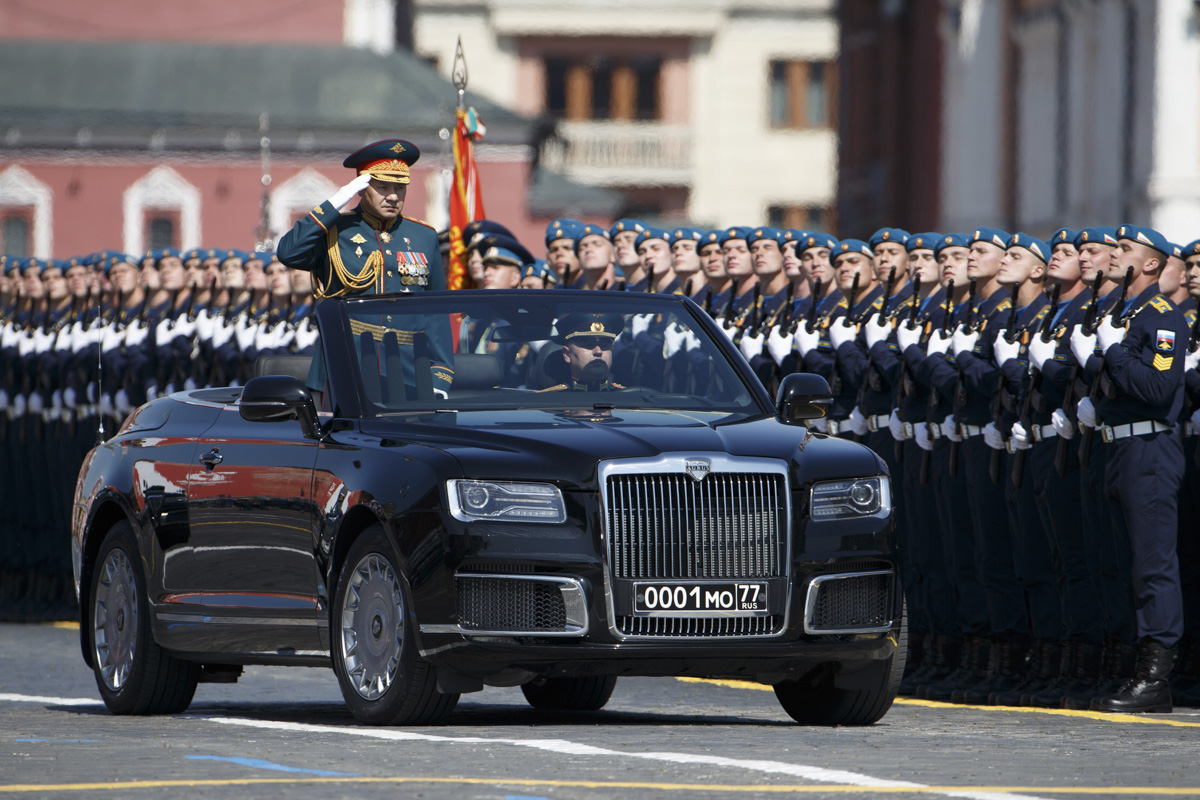
General Sergey Shoigu just prior to delivering the parade report.

Bold indicates first appearance, italic indicates multiple appearances, Bold and italic indicate returning appearance, all indicated unless otherwise noted.

- General of the Army Sergey Shoigu, Minister of Defense of the Russian Federation (parade reviewing inspector)
- General of the Army Oleg Salyukov, Commander-in-Chief of the Russian Ground Forces (parade commander)

=== Military bands ===
- Massed Military Bands of the Armed Forces under the direction of the Senior Director of Music of the Military Band Service of the Armed Forces of Russia, Major General Timofey Mayakin
- Corps of Drums of the Moscow Military Music College – Led by the College Commandant, Colonel Alexander Gerasimov

=== Infantry column ===
- 154th Preobrazhensky Independent Commandant's Regiment Colour Guard
- 1st Honour Guard Company of the 1st Honor Guard Battalion, 154th PICR – Led by Colonel Sergey Beassanov
- Front standards and historical colours
- Historical units
  - Infantrymen
  - Aviators
  - Sailors
  - Combat engineers
  - Reconnaissance
  - **Border Troops of the NKVD** (first appearance)
  - Militiamen
  - **Combined Don Cossacks Company** (first appearance) – Led by Head of the All-Russian Cossack Society, Cossack General Nikolai Doluda
  - **Company of servicemen in the 1945 Victory Parade** (first appearance) – Led by Lieutenant General Andrey Toporov
- Foreign contingents on parade, in the order of their appearance
  - (Azerbaijan) Azerbaijani peacekeeping forces – Led by Major Samik Namedov
  - Separate Regiment of Protection, Armed Forces of Armenia – Led by Colonel Ashot Hakobyan
  - Honor Guard of the Armed Forces of Belarus – Led by First Lieutenant Vladislav Shepelevich
  - (India) Tri-Services Guard of Honour – Led by Colonel Anil Kumar from the Sikh Light Infantry
  - (Kazakhstan) 36th Air Assault Brigade, Kazakh Airmobile Forces – Led by Lieutenant Colonel Ulan Nurgaziyev
  - (Kyrgyzstan) Military Institute of the Armed Forces of the Kyrgyz Republic – Led by Colonel Bekkazy Tumenbaev
  - (China) Beijing Capital Garrison Honor Guard Battalion, Central Theater Command, People's Liberation Army – Led by Major General Bao Zemin and Senior Colonel Han Jie
  - (Moldova) Honor Guard Company of the Moldovan National Army – Led by Captain Vitalie Josan
  - (Mongolia) 032 Military Unit, Mongolian Armed Forces – Led by Colonel Batdelger Hasherdene
  - (Serbia) Serbian Guards Unit – Led by Lieutenant Colonel Dragan Jakovljević
  - (Tajikistan) Alumni Company of the Military Institute from the Honour Guard of the General Staff – Led by Lieutenant Colonel Fayzimuhammad Hafizzoda
  - Color Guards of the Independent Honor Guard Battalion of the Ministry of Defence of Turkmenistan
  - **Personnel of the Tashkent Military District of the Ministry of Defence of Uzbekistan** (first appearance) – Led by Colonel Shokir Khairov
- Suvorov Military School
- Nakhimov Naval School
- Kronstadt Sea Cadet Corps
- Moscow Young Army Patriotic Cadets Unit (on behalf of the Young Army Cadets National Movement)
- Combined Regiment of the Russian Ground Forces
  - Combined Arms Academy of the Armed Forces of the Russian Federation
  - Military University of the Ministry of Defense of the Russian Federation
  - **Grand Duke Mikhailovskaya Military Artillery Academy** (first appearance)
  - Military Academy of the Armed Forces Air Defense Branch "Marshal Alexander Vasilevsky"
  - Military Logistics Academy "General of the Army A. V. Khrulev"
- Combined regiment of female cadets of Armed Forces educational institutions
  - Female Cadets of the Ground Forces (Military University, Military Medical and Military Logistics Academy)
  - Female Cadets of the Aerospace Forces (Air Force Academy)
- Combined Regiment of the Russian Aerospace Forces
  - Zhukovsky - Gagarin Air Force Academy
  - Military Space Academy "Alexander Mozhaysky"
- Combined Regiment of the Russian Navy
  - Baltic Naval Institute "Admiral Feodor Ushakov"
  - **Pacific Naval Institute "Admiral Sergei Makarov"** (returning)
  - 336th Guards Naval Infantry Brigade of the Baltic Fleet
- Peter the Great Military Academy of the Strategic Missile Forces
- Combined regiment of the Russian Airborne Forces
  - Ryazan Guards Higher Airborne Command School "General of the Army Vasily Margelov"
  - 331st Guards Airborne Regiment, 98th Guards Airborne Division
  - **104th Air Assault Regiment, 76th Guards Air Assault Division** (first appearance)
- **Budyonny Military Academy of the Signal Corps** (first appearance)
- **45th Guards Berlin Engineering Brigade** (first appearance)
- 34th and 38th Independent Railway Brigades of the Russian Railway Troops
- NBC Protection Military Academy "Marshal Semyon Timoshenko"
- Civil Defense Academy of the Ministry of Emergency Situations
- Separate Operational Purpose Division of the National Guard Forces Command, Federal National Guard Troops Service of the Russian Federation "Felix Dzerzhinsky"
- Moscow Border Institute of the Border Service of the FSB of the Russian Federation "Moscow City Council"
- Combined regiment of the Greater Moscow units of the 1st Guards Tank Army, Western Military District
  - 2nd Guards Tamanskaya Motor Rifle Division "Mikhail Kalinin"
  - 4th Guards Kantermirskaya Tank Division "Yuri Andropov"
- Moscow Higher Military Command School "Supreme Soviet of Russia"

=== Mobile column ===
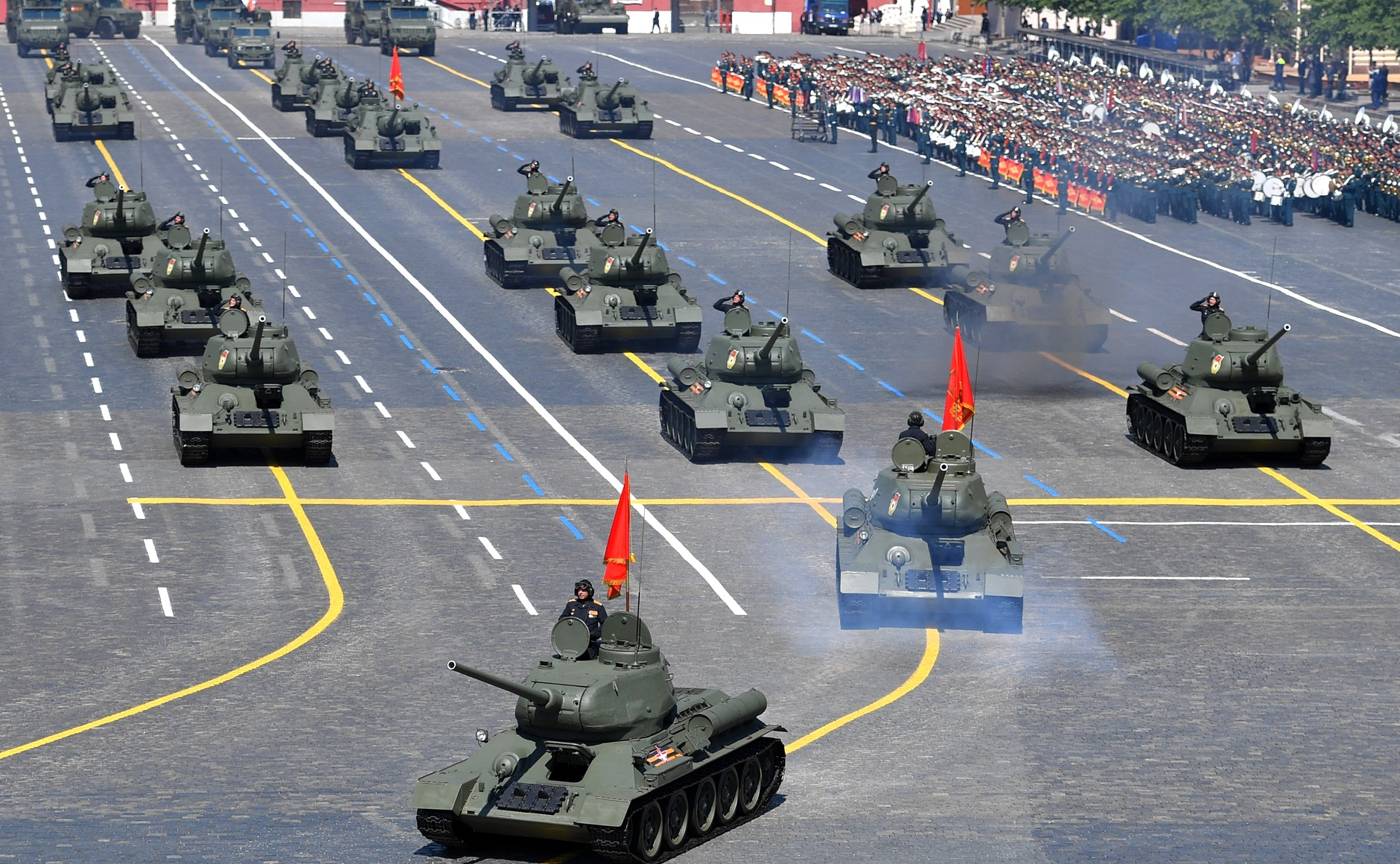
A column of T-34/85 tanks.

- T-34/85 medium tank
- **SU-100** tank destroyer
- GAZ-233114 "Tigr-M" infantry mobility vehicle (45th Guards Independent Reconnaissance Brigade)
- GAZ-233114 "Tigr-M" with Arbalet-DM remote weapon station mounting a Kord heavy machine gun (45th Guards Independent Reconnaissance Brigade)
- Kornet D/EM mobile ATGM system on the GAZ-233116 "Tigr-M" chassis (45th Guards Independent Reconnaissance Brigade)
- **Derivatsia-PVO** Tracked, Self-Propelled Anti-Aircraft Artillery (SPAAA) Vehicle (first appearance)
- BMP Kurganets-25 IFV (27th Independent Guards "Sevastopol" Motorized Rifle Brigade)
- **T-15 Armata** heavy IFV (27th Independent Guards "Sevastopol" Motorized Rifle Brigade) (returning)
- **BMP-2** infantry fighting vehicle (27th Independent Guards "Sevastopol" Motorized Rifle Brigade) (returning)
- BMP-3 infantry fighting vehicle (27th Independent Guards "Sevastopol" Motorized Rifle Brigade)
- T-14 main battle tank (2nd Guards "Tamanskaya" Motorized Rifle Division)
- BMPT Terminator armored support combat vehicle (2nd Guards "Tamanskaya" Motorized Rifle Division)
- T-72B3M (T-72B4) modernized main battle tank (2nd Guards "Tamanskaya" Motorized Rifle Division)
- **T-80BVM** modernized main battle tank (2nd Guards "Tamanskaya" Motorized Rifle Division) (returning)
- **Т-90M** modernized main battle tank (2nd Guards "Tamanskaya" Motorized Rifle Division) (returning)
- BMD-4M air-droppable IFV (106th Guards Tula Airborne Division)
- BTR-MDM "Rakushka" APC (106th Guards Tula Airborne Division)
- 2S19 Msta-S tracked self-propelled howitzer (236th Self-Propelled Artillery Regiment)
- BM-30 Smerch mobile MRL system (112th Guards "Novorossiysk" MRL Brigade)
- 9K720 Iskander-M mobile tactical ballistic missile system (112th Guards "Novorossiysk" MRL Brigade)
- **TOS-1 Buratino** multiple rocket launcher and thermobaric weapon mounted on the T-72 tank chassis (20th NBC Protection Regiment) (first appearance)
- Tor-M2U SAM complex on tracked chassis (6th Independent Tank Brigade)
- Buk-M2 mobile tracked SAM system (6th Independent Tank Brigade)
- Pantsir-S1 mobile SAM system on wheeled chassis (93rd Guards Anti-Aircraft Rocket Regiment)
- **S-350E Vityaz 50R6** mobile SAM system on wheeled chassis (93rd Guards Anti-Aircraft Rocket Regiment) (first appearance)
- S-400 Triumf SAM launch system on 5P85SM2-01 transporter-erector launcher (93rd Guards Anti-Aircraft Rocket Regiment)
- **3K60 Bal** coastal defense mobile missile system on wheeled chassis (536th Independent Coastal Missile-Artillery Brigade) (first appearance)
- Kamaz 53949 Typhoon-K light MRAP (Russian Military Police)
- Ural Typhoon MRAP (Russian Military Police)
- Patrul-A MRAP (National Guard of Russia Separate Operational Purpose Division, National Guard Forces Command)
- Ural-VV MRAP (National Guard of Russia Separate Operational Purpose Division, National Guard Forces Command)
- RS-24 Yars ICBM on 15U175M wheeled transporter-erector launcher (54th Guards Rocket Division)
- VPK-7829 Bumerang wheeled APC

=== Air fly-past column ===
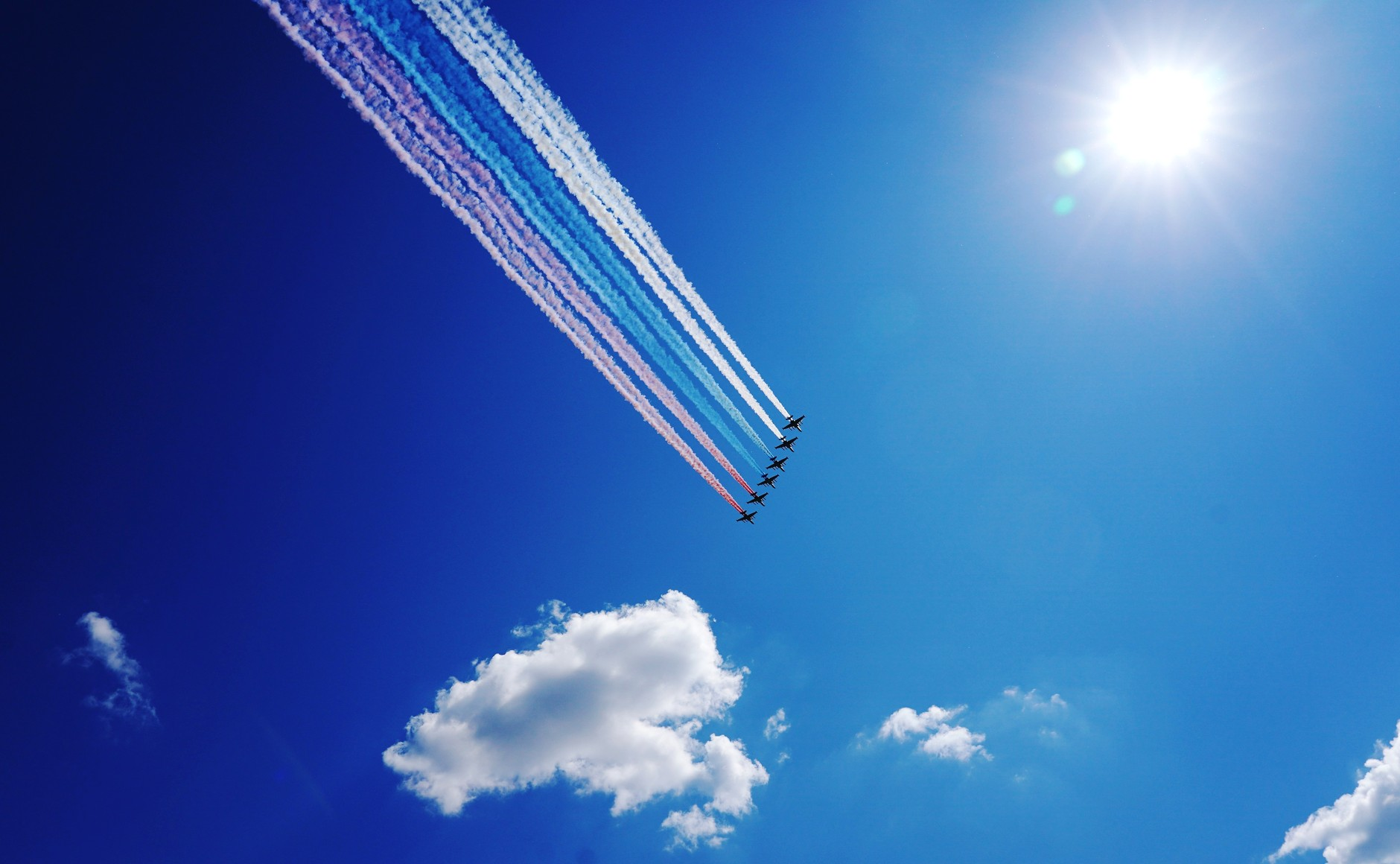
The Russian tricolour flying over Red Square.

- Mil Mi-26
- Mil Mi-8
- Mil Mi-35
- Kamov Ka-52
- Mil Mi-28N
- Beriev A-50
- Ilyushin Il-76
- Tupolev Tu-95MS
- Tupolev Tu-160
- Tupolev Tu-22M3
- Ilyushin Il-78
- Tupolev Tu-160
- Mikoyan MiG-29
- Sukhoi Su-24
- Mikoyan MiG-31K
- Sukhoi Su-57
- Sukhoi Su-35
- Sukhoi Su-34
- Sukhoi Su-30
- Sukhoi Su-30SM from flight demonstration squadron Russian Knights
- Mikoyan MiG-29 from flight demonstration squadron Swifts
- Sukhoi Su-25

== Music ==
Music was performed by the massed bands of the Moscow Garrison, commanded by Major general Timofey Mayakin.

Inspection of Troops

- Sacred War ("Священная война") by Aleksandr Aleksandrov
- Jubilee Slow March "25 Years of the Red Army" (Юбилейный встречный марш "25 лет РККА") by Semyon Tchernetsky
- March of the Life-Guard Preobrazhensky Regiment ("Марш Лейб-гвардии Преображенского полка")
- Slow March of the Military Schools ("Встречный марш военных училищ") by Semyon Tchernetsky
- Slow March for Carrying Out the Combat Banner ("Встречный Марш для выноса Боевого Знамени") Dmitriy Kadeyev
- Guards Slow March of the Navy (Гвардейский Встречный Марш Военно-Морского Флота") by Nikolay Ivanov-Radkevich
- Slow March (Встречный марш) by Yevgeniy Aksyonov
- Slav'sya ("Славься") by Mikhail Glinka
- Moscow Parade Fanfare ("Московская Парадная Фанфара")

Speech by President of the Russian Federation, Vladimir Putin

- State Anthem of the Russian Federation ("Государственный гимн Российской Федерации") by Aleksandr Aleksandrov
- Signal Retreat ("Сигнал Отбой")

Infantry Column

- Drum and Fife based on the theme from the March "General Miloradovich" ("Тема из Марша Генерал Милорадович") by Valeriy Khalilov
- Metropolitan March ("Марш "Столичный") by Viktor Runov
- Triumph of the Winners (Триумф Победителей)
- March Cossacks in Berlin (Марш "Казаки в Берлине") by the Pokrass Brothers
- Salute to Moscow (Салют Москвы) by Semyon Tchernetsky
- Phalanx March ("Строевой Марш") by Dmitriy Pertsev
- Moscow in May ("Москва майская") by the Pokrass Brothers
- March of the Nakhimov Naval Cadets ("Марш нахимовцев") by Vasiliy Solovyov-Sedoy
- Sports March ("Спортивный Марш") by Valentin Volkov
- In Defense of the Motherland ("Марш В защиту Родины") by Viktor Runov
- Katyusha ("Катюша") by Matvey Blanter
- Air March ("Авиaмарш") by Yuriy Khayt
- I Believe, My Friends ("Я верю, друзья") by Oskar Fel'tsman
- March The Sea is Calling (Марш "Море зовёт") by Aleksandra Pakhmutova
- The Crew is One Family (Экипаж - одна семья) by Viktor Pleshak
- March of the Artillerymen ("Марш артиллеристов") by Tikhon Khrennikov
- We Need One Victory ("Нам нужна одна Победа") by Bulat Okudzhava
- March Leningrad ("Марш Ленинград") by Viktor Runov
- March Parade (Марш "Парад") by Semyon Tchernetsky
- Song of the Perturbed Youth ("Песня о тревожной молодости") by Aleksandra Pakhmutova
- To Serve Russia ("Служить России") by Eduard Khanok
- On Guard for Peace ("На страже Мира") by Boris Diyev
- Let's Go ("В путь") by Vasiliy Solovyov-Sedoy
- Drum and Fife based on the theme from the March "General Miloradovich" ("Тема из Марша Генерал Милорадович") by Valeriy Khalilov

Mobile Column

- Long Live Our State ("Да здравствует наша держава") by Boris Aleksandrov
- March Three Tankmen (Марш "Три Танкиста") by the Pokrass Brothers
- Invincible and Legendary (Несокрушимая и легендарная) by Aleksandr Aleksandrov
- March of the Soviet Tankists (Марш советских танкистов) by the Pokrass Brothers
- March Joy of the Victory (Марш "Радость Победы") by Vasiliy Bekker
- March Small Land (Марш "Малая земля") by Aleksandra Pakhmutova
- Katyusha ("Катюша") by Matvey Blanter
- March Hero ("Марш Герой")
- March Victory (Марш “Победа”) by Albert Mikhailovich Arutyunov
- Long Live Our State ("Да здравствует наша держава") by Boris Aleksandrov

Air Column

- Air March ("Авиaмарш") by Yuriy Khayt
- Embracing the Sky (Обнимая небо) by Alexandra Pakhmutova
- March Airplanes – First of all (Марш “Первым делом самолёты”) by Vasiliy Solovyov-Sedoy
- I Believe, My Friends ("Я верю, друзья") by Oskar Fel'tsman
- March Sentinels of the Sky (Марш "Часовые Неба") by Valentin Volkov
- Air March ("Авиaмарш") by Yuriy Khayt

Conclusion of the Parade

- March Victory Day (Марш "День Победы") by David Tukhmanov

Ceremony at the Tomb of the Unknown Soldier

- Eternal Flame ("Вечный огонь) by Rafail Khozak
- Adagio ("Адажио") by Valeriy Khalilov
- State Anthem of the Russian Federation ("Государственный гимн Российской Федерации") by Aleksandr Aleksandrov
- The Sacred War ("Священная война") by Aleksandr Aleksandrov
- Silence ("Тишина") by Lev Gurov

== Other parades ==
=== In Russia ===
As per tradition, 27 other Russian major cities (Sevastopol and Kerch in the disputed Crimea included) are expected to hold commemorative parades on the same day as Moscow's (some of them including flypasts and fleet reviews expected in Kaliningrad, Saint Petersburg, Sevastopol, Murmansk, Vladivostok and Astrakhan), and joint civil-military parades were hosted by over 20 other towns and cities nationwide, with three cities moving their parades to other dates in Perm Krai, Belgorod Oblast and Oryol Oblast (the first of 12 to do so). The new dates for the parades there, respectively, are on 3 September (Victory over Japan Day), 12 July (Belgorod City Day), and 5 August (Oryol Liberation Day). The parade in Komi was set for 4 September on the occasion of the republic's 99th anniversary, which will be a kick-off towards the celebrations in 2021 of the republic's centennial jubilee year anniversary. The website Znak.com reported that at least 40 regions in Russia had cancelled their parades or held them without spectators due to the virus, where 30 major cities had cancelled their parade. Once more, marking a historic anniversary since the victory in Europe, for the second straight year the mobile column of the St. Petersburg parade on Palace Square, one of the biggest regional parades outside Moscow, displayed Soviet unit banners perpetuating the Second World War lineage and service of the formations that provided the vehicles (save for the Military Police, whose service banner was displayed). This happened for the first time in Yekaterinburg's 1905 Square during the mobile column segment. The Head of the Joint Operative Headquarters of the Norwegian Armed Forces Rune Jakobsen led the delegation at the parade in Murmansk at the invitation of the Commander of the Northern Fleet.

In early 2020, it was confirmed that foreign servicemen from the armed forces of Kazakhstan, Kyrgyzstan, Tajikistan and Uzbekistan will take part in the parade in Yekaterinburg, as well an 80-man contingent from Armenia in Rostov-on-Don, and a contingent from Norway in Murmansk, plans which were later scrapped.

=== In other countries ===
Celebrations of the holiday were held in almost all the former republics of the Soviet Union in celebration of this milestone anniversary, including in the following cities:

- Belarus: 9 May (Minsk, Brest)
- Ukraine: 9 May (Kyiv, Kharkiv, Odesa)
- Kazakhstan: 7 May (Minor observances only in Nur-Sultan, Almaty and Baikonur, also marking Defender of the Fatherland Day)
- Kyrgyzstan: 9 May (Bishkek)
- Georgia: 9 May (Tbilisi)
- Armenia : 9 May (Yerevan, Gyumri)
- Azerbaijan: 9 May (Baku)
- Tajikistan: 9 May (Dushanbe)
- Turkmenistan: 9 May (Ashgabat)
- Moldova: 23 August (Chișinău)

Kazakhstan cancelled its Victory Day parade in Nur-Sultan on 12 March 2020 as preventive measures against the ongoing COVID-19 pandemic. The Nagorno-Karabakh Republic celebrated the day with a parade and other activities in Stepanakert on 9 May, also celebrating the 28th anniversary of the Capture of Shusha during the First Nagorno-Karabakh War. Due to the pandemic, only small celebrations were held, plus a flypast at Yerevan's Mother Armenia monument in Armenia as a tribute to all who fought in both the Second World War and the conflict in Nagorno-Karabakh.

In Ukraine, all formal parades were cancelled by order of Prime Minister Denys Shmyhal in light of the COVID-19 pandemic in Ukraine. President Zelenskyy went on a working visit to Luhansk Oblast where he visited an urban settlement that is divided by the border between Ukraine and Russia. In the settlement, he visited the memorial complex "Ukraine to the Liberators". He also visited the Zakarpattia Oblast, where he also laid flowers at the "Hill of Glory" memorial complex.

Belarus and Turkmenistan were the only nations in the Commonwealth of Independent States to hold diamond jubilee parades on 9 May. In Turkmenistan, the 75th anniversary of the victory in the war was celebrated with a military parade for the first time. The parade was held at a square in front of the Halk Hakydasy Memorial Complex, with a special appearance by the banner of the 748th Infantry Regiment of the 206th Rifle Division of the 2nd Ukrainian Front, which was brought into the capital from Moscow. When speaking on the decision to hold the parade in Minsk, President Alexander Lukashenko described it as "an emotional, deeply ideological thing". There were reports that suggested university students were offered incentives (including academic and dormitory bonuses for members of the Belarusian Academy of Sciences and recovered COVID-19 patients) to attend the parade.

== See also ==
- Moscow Victory Parade of 1945
- Victory Day (9 May)
- Victory in Europe Day
- Victory Day Parades
- 2020 Minsk Victory Day Parade
