= Jubilee Slow March "25 Years of the Red Army" =

Soviet Russian-language military march

The Jubilee Slow March "25 Years of the RKKA" (Note: "RKKA" is a Russian abbreviation for the "Workers and Peasants Red Army.") (Russian: Юбилейный встречный марш "25 лет РККА"), was a Soviet inspection march composed by Semyon Tchernetsky in 1943. Gramophone record n. 265 from the repository of the Russian State Archive of Phono-Documents indicates that the march was dedicated to the last Generalissimo of the Imperial Russian Army, Alexander Suvorov, under the title of "Slow Suvorov" (Russian: "Встречный Суворов"). The march was most notably performed during the Moscow Victory Parade of 1945, when Marshal of the Soviet Union, Georgy Zhukov, rode his stallion through the gate of Spasskaya Tower onto Red Square. The 2020 Moscow Victory Day Parade as well as parades in regional cities, all of which were held on 24 June instead of 9 May, honoured the 1945 parade with the bands playing the jubilee march at the outset of the parade inspection.

== See also ==
- March of the Defenders of Moscow
- March of the Soviet Tankmen
- Air March
- Workers and Peasants Red Army
