= Tri Tankista =

Soviet patriotic song (1939)

"The clouds fly gloomly across the border" (Russian: На границе тучи ходят хмуро), better known as "Tri tankista" (Russian: Три танкиста, literally: the Three Tankmen), is a popular Soviet war song written in 1939. The song served as the unofficial anthem of the Soviet, and later Russian, Border Troops and Armored Forces. The song was first performed on film by actor Nikolai Kryuchkov in the film The Tractor Drivers (1939), shortly after the Battle of Khalkhin Gol.

== Background ==
The song refers to the Battle of Lake Khasan, an attempted Japanese incursion into Siberia in 1938. This battle saw, for the first time, with the exception of the Spanish Civil War, the use and victory of armoured forces by the Soviets. Light tanks then were composed of only three crew members: a driver, a loader, and a commander (serving also as a gunner). It was not until the middle of the Second World War that a radio operator was available in Soviet tanks. The song tells the story of how the tank crew valiantly repelled the Japanese with their battle tanks.

== Lyrics ==
The song lyrics were written by Boris Savelyevich Laskin, written to a composition by the Pokrass brothers.

Russian original

На границе тучи ходят хмуро,
Край суровый тишиной объят.
У высоких берегов Амура
Часовые родины стоят.

Там врагу заслон поставлен прочный,
Там стоит, отважен и силён,
У границ земли дальневосточной
Броневой ударный батальон.

Там живут — и песня в том порука –
Нерушимой, крепкою семьёй
Три танкиста, три весёлых друга —
Экипаж машины боевой.

На траву легла роса густая,
Полегли туманы широки.
В эту ночь решили самураи
Перейти границу у реки.

Но разведка доложила точно, —
И пошёл командою взметён,
По родной земле дальневосточной
Броневой ударный батальон.

Мчались танки, ветер подымая,
Наступала грозная броня.
И летели наземь самураи
Под напором стали и огня.

И добили — песня в том порука
Всех врагов в атаке огневой
Три танкиста, три весёлых друга
Экипаж машины боевой.

Romanization of Russian

Na granitse tuchi khodyat khmuro,
Kray surovy tishinoy obyat.
U vysokikh beregov Amura
Chasovye rodiny stoyat.

Tam vragu zaslon postavlen prochny,
Tam stoit, otvazhen i silyon,
U granits zemli dalnevostochnoy
Bronevoy udarny batalyon.

Tam zhivut — i pesnya v tom poruka –
Nerushimoy, krepkoyu semyoy
Tri tankista, tri vesyolykh druga —
Ekipazh mashiny boevoy.

Na travu legla rosa gustaya,
Polegli tumany shiroki.
V etu noch reshili samurai
Pereyti granitsu u reki.

No razvedka dolozhila tochno, —
I poshol komandoyu vzmetyon,
Po rodnoy zemle dalnevostochnoy
Bronevoy udarny batalyon.

Mchalis tanki, veter podymaya,
Nastupala groznaya bronya.
I leteli nazem samurai
Pod naporom stali i ognya.

I dobili — pesnya v tom poruka
Vsekh vragov v atake ognevoy
Tri tankista, tri vesyolykh druga
Ekipazh mashiny boevoy.

English translation

The clouds fly gloomily across the border,
The area surrounded by silence.
On the high banks of the Amur
Stand the guards of the motherland.

A shield stands there steadily against the enemy.
And there stand the brave and the strong.
On the border of the far eastern lands
An armoured assault battalion.

Those who live there, this song is their pledge,
The unbreakable family
Three Tankmen, three merry friends -
The crew of the combat machine.

Thick dew laid on the grass,
The wide fog descended
That night the samurai decided
To cross that border at the river.

But intelligence reported accurately,
And they went as ordered,
On the native far eastern land,
The armoured assault battalion.

The tanks rushed up, the wind blew hard,
The formidable armour was advancing.
And then the samurai fell
Under the pressure of steel and fire.

And they finished off, and the song is the pledge
To all the enemies in a fiery attack
Three Tankmen, three merry friends -
The crew of the combat machine.

== See also ==
- Soviet Tankmen's Song
- March of the Soviet Tankmen
- Panzerlied
