= Registered Cossacks of the Russian Federation =

Russian ethnic paramilitary society

- Государственный реестр казачьих обществ Российской Федерации
- The emblem of the All-Russian Cossack Society
- Founded: 1995
- Country: Russia
- Allegiance: President of Russia
- Type: Paramilitary
- Size: ~40,000
- Garrison/HQ: Moscow, Russia
- Website: vsko.ru

Commanders
- Ataman: Vitaly Vladimirovich Kuznetsov
- Chairman of the Council for Cossack Affairs: Anatoly Seryshev

Insignia
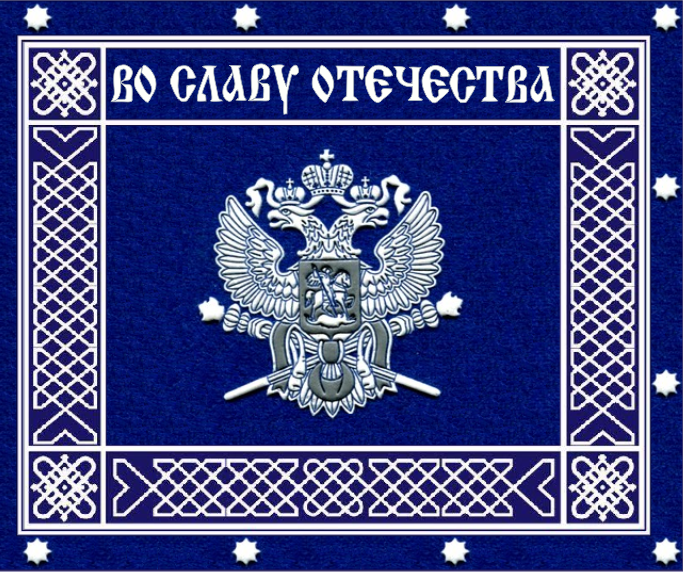
- Flag

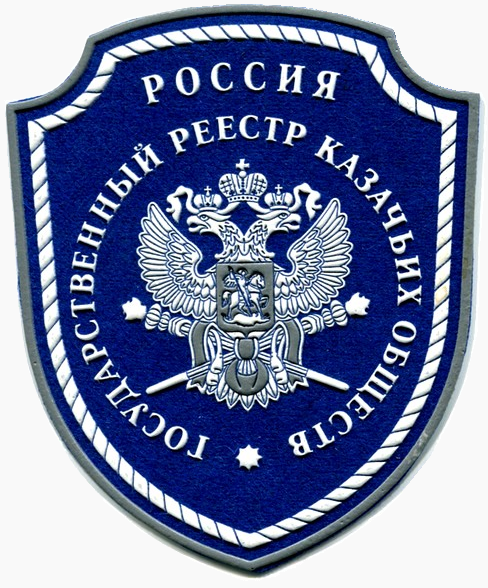
- Patch
- Abbreviation: Казачество (Kazachestvo)

The Registered Cossacks of the Russian Federation are a paramilitary formation that originally performed non-military and public safety services since December 2005. Since the 2008 Russian invasion of Georgia, the Registered Cossacks have assumed a direct military role.

== Background ==
Historically, Cossacks were a semi-nomadic and semi-militarized people, who, while under the nominal suzerainty of various Eastern European kingdoms at the time, were allowed a great degree of self-governance in exchange for their military service. Although numerous linguistic and religious groups came together to form the Cossacks, most of them coalesced and became East Slavic–speaking Orthodox Christians.

Starting with the Russian Revolution of 1905, Cossacks became increasingly employed by Tsarist officials for internal security due to their perception of not being tainted by revolutionary ideals, unlike the average Russian foot-soldier. The Russian Army Command centralized and modernized Cossack institutions and placed them firmly under the command of the Russian monarchy. These institutions became resentful due to overconscription and lack of compensation for the heavy Cossack presence in Manchuria during the Russo-Japanese War (1904–1905).

When the February Revolution began (1917), Cossack troops notably deserted from Tsarist ranks, and the Russian Provisional Government gave the Cossacks autonomy to self-govern themselves through assemblies called krugs or radas led by an Ataman. These Cossack autonomies refused to recognize the new Soviet Federative government after the October Revolution (1917), and became de-facto independent in the form of the Don Republic and the Kuban People's Republic that nominally sided with the White movement to fight the Bolsheviks and preserve their autonomy.

A significant number of Cossacks also fought for the Bolsheviks as so called "Red Cossacks". From 1919 to 1933, the Soviet Union underwent an official policy of "De-Cossackization" to destroy the Cossack way of life due to their leadership's support for the White movement. Thousands of Cossacks were killed, their institutions destroyed, and their remaining people either deported and or forcefully integrated into the "Russian" identity over the subsequent decades.

Thousands of Cossacks would flee Russia during and immediately after the civil war as émigrés living in Bulgaria, Czechoslovakia, Yugoslavia, and France. This also included the entire Transbaikal Cossack Host, whose Ataman Grigory Semyonov was able to flee to Japanese-controlled Manchukuo and assisted the Kwantung Army.

During World War II, as with other White Russian émigrés, Cossack leaders and officers were recruited by Nazi Germany into Cossack collaborationist formations of the Wehrmacht and later the Waffen-SS. The Germans organized the 1st SS Cossack Cavalry Division to consist of these émigrés as well as Cossack POWs. In 1943 the German government created the Main Administration of Cossack Forces led by Pyotr Krasnov, former Ataman of the Don Republic.

At the end of the war these Cossack units, along with the Kazachi Stan mobile encampment, fought towards Western Allied lines, and capitulated to British forces, in order to avoid surrendering to the Red Army and Yugoslav Partisans. This resulted in the forced repatriation to the Soviet Union where they were executed or sentenced to hard labor.

Despite this the remaining Cossack diaspora would continue to call for an independent "Cossack Nation" throughout the Cold War, with Nikolai Nazarenko becoming a leading figure as the President of the "World Federation of the Cossack National Liberation Movement of Cossackia" a New York based pressure and cultural group for Cossacks, that called for an independent Cossack state dubbed "Cossackia" which they argued was a "captive nation." Time was not on the exiled Cossacks side, as with each generation that passed the Cossack identity was further suppressed in Russia until it was all but destroyed, existing only in fringe exile organizations across the west led by increasingly aged elders.

=== Cossack revivalism ===
During the collapse of the Soviet Union in the late 80s and early 90s, thousands of Russian-speaking Orthodox Slavs in border regions, especially the North Caucasus, sought to revive a Cossack identity. Although these "Cossacks" and their institutions bore little to no continuity with the historical Cossack hosts these Cossack-revivalists "re-created" many historic Cossack "circles", crowned "atamans", and even attempted to form pro-Russian secessionists efforts in independence seeking nations, like Chechnya.

In 1992, 11 of these revived circles met on the issue of prospective independence and support for Nazarenko's proposal of an independent "Cossackia". All 11 of them rejected the proposal and instead called for a "United Russia." A growing and militant paramilitary supportive of Russian Neo-Imperalistic ambitions across the Caucasus and Eastern Europe, the Russian government quickly sought to subordinate these "circles" first in 1995 and 1997 via Presidential decrees, and again in 2005 through an official law that passed through the Duma.

== History ==
There reportedly are up to 10 million Cossacks in Russia. The registered Cossack associations include around 740,000 people, of whom around 600,000 also carry out border and security tasks. However, in the 2010 Russian census, only about 67,000 people described themselves as Cossacks.

Cossack units have also been raised for and existing Cossack units have been placed under the control of the National Guard of Russia.

=== Registered Cossacks in military service ===
Cossack units helped in the Russian operations in Abkhazia, South Ossetia, and Transnistria.

==== 2008 Russian invasion of Georgia ====
Cossacks also took an active role in the 2008 Russian–Georgian war during which no one could explain what role the Cossacks played in the campaign, as Russian soldiers were distinguished between regular servicemen and Cossacks.

==== Russo-Ukrainian War ====
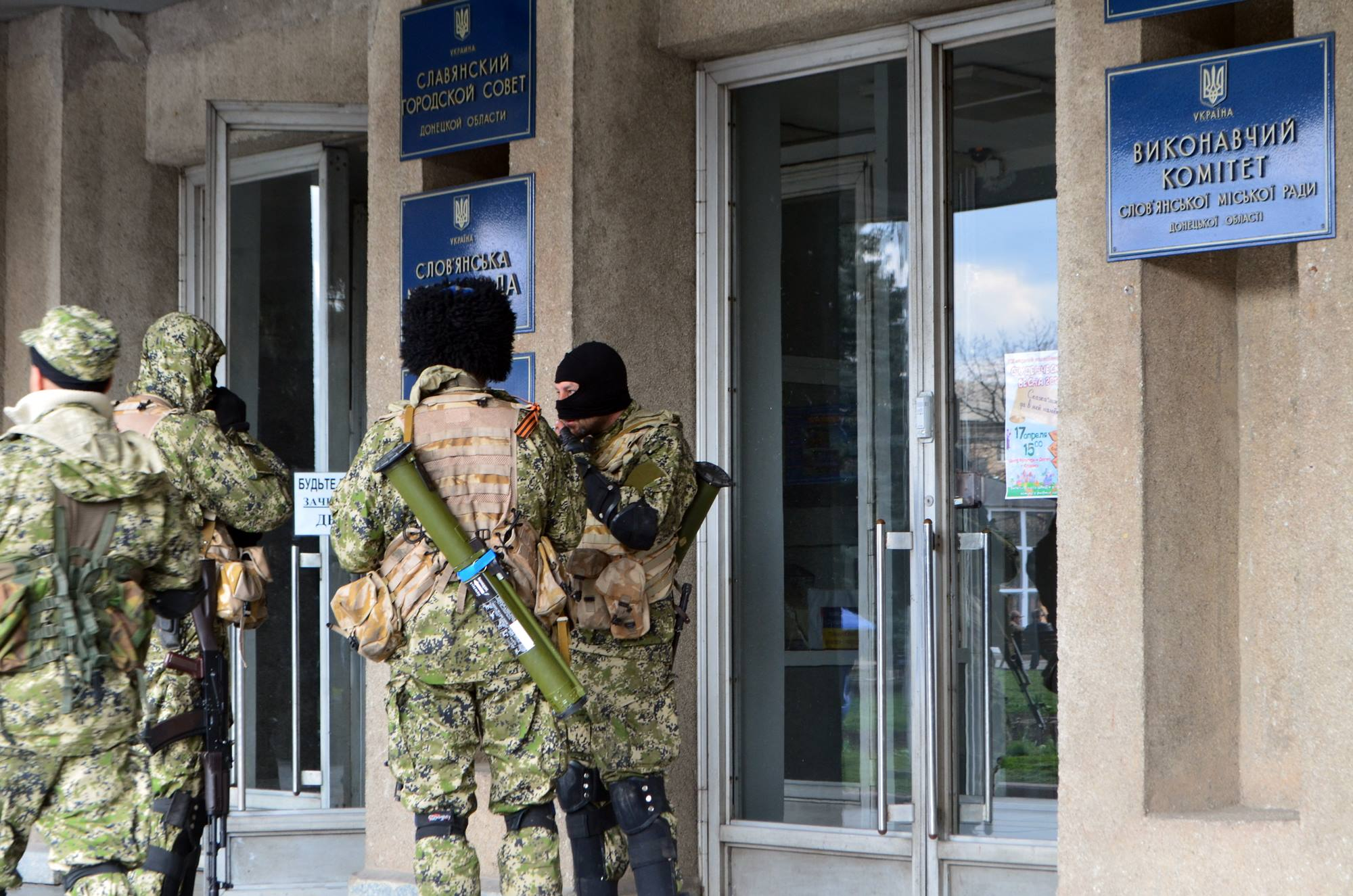
Sloviansk city council under control of Russian Registered Cossacks, April 2014

===== 2014 =====
Various Registered Cossacks of the Russian Federation were identified operating in Eastern Ukraine and Crimea in 2014 during the Russo-Ukrainian War with Kuban Cossacks helping occupy the Crimea and Don Cossacks invading the Donbas. Cossack units were organized communities not as spontaneous volunteers.

===== 2022 =====
Registered Cossacks are heavily involved in the 2022 Russian invasion of Ukraine where they are part of 18 ‘Cossack’ BARS (Combat Reserve Forces) battalions taking part in the invasion. Per Ataman Nikolai Doluda, head of the All-Russian Cossack Society,"There are three battalions each from the Kuban and Terek hosts, two from Don, one from Orenburg, a Orenburg-Volga combined battalion, one from the Ussuriskiy host, one from the Zabaykalsky host, and one from the union of “Cossack” warriors from abroad" Various sources number Registered Cossacks in the warzone from 15,000 to 25,000.

== Duties ==
In peacetime, the registered Cossacks are used for the following activities and functions: conservation, protection and restoration of forests; patriotic education of young people and their preparation for military service; Assistance in natural disasters, accidents, catastrophes and other emergencies; extinguishing forest fires and other fires; protection of public order; Border protection and securing the state border; Protection in municipalities and in municipal institutions and organizations; In some regions, the operation of a city police force (including special units "Kobra"), in which numerous Cossacks ensure public safety.

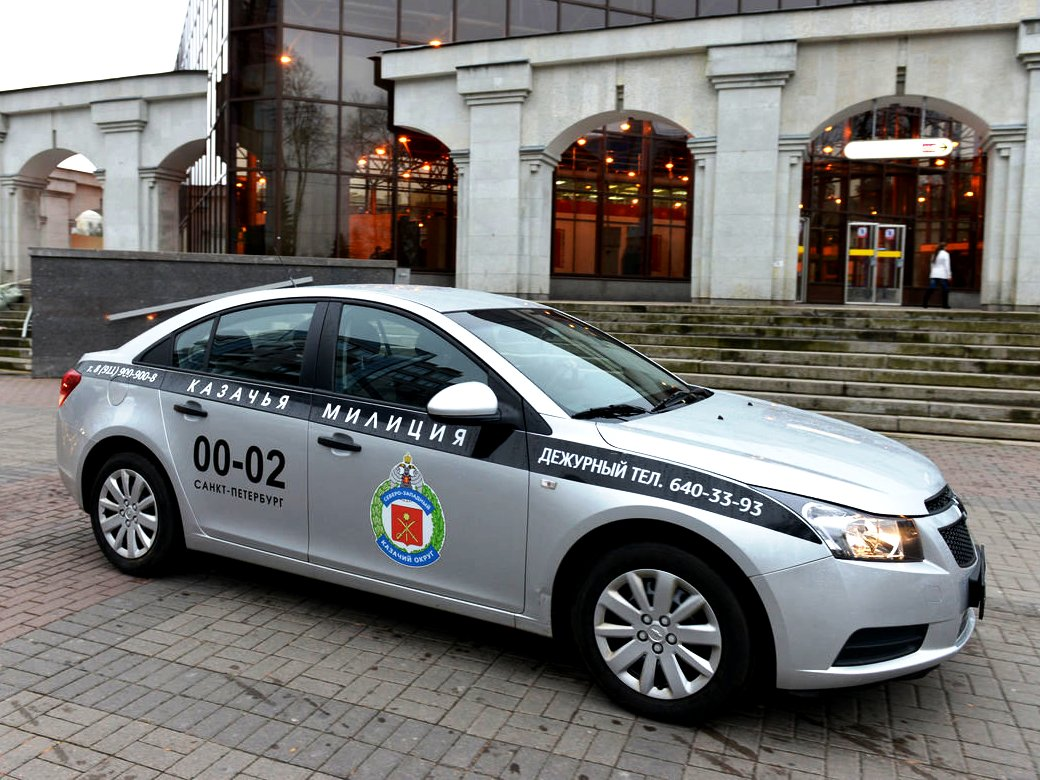
A Cossack Militsiya Chevrolet Cruze patrol car in Saint Petersburg.

Registered Cossacks perform a substitute function on behalf of the Ministry of Internal Affairs and the Ministry of Emergency Situations. In this way, they compensate for the lack of trained personnel in the country's security structures and, through their voluntary work, they contribute to savings for the state budget.

Registered Cossacks receive a stipend and are granted certain privileges: a uniform, a rank, insignia and awards, wearing a Cossack whip (nagaika), sword (shashka), dagger (Qama) and, in certain cases, firearms or a firearms permit in exchange for providing security in certain areas. Registered Cossacks often wear uniforms of the Russian army or uniforms similar to that of the Imperial Russian Army.

== All-Russian Cossack Society ==
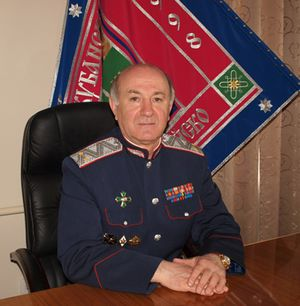
Ataman Nikolai Doluda, with the rank of Cossack General, was head of the All-Russian Cossack Society in the newer standing collar uniform. He was replaced in 2023 by Cossack General Vitaly Vladimirovich Kuznetsov.

The All-Russian Cossack Society (Russian: Всероссийское казачье общество, Latinized: Vserossiyskoye kazach'ye obshchestvo) is a government sponsored Cossack advocacy organization in the Russian Federation. It is responsible for the coordination of activities between the 12 registered Cossack hosts. In particular, it works in the spheres of patriotic education and the continuing historical Cossack customs and traditions. Both registered and non-registered Cossack organizations can be part of the society. It is headed by the Society Ataman, Cossack General Nikolai Doluda.

Cossack ranks from yesaul and above are appointed by a Presidential Envoy, the rank of a Cossack general by no less than the President of the Russian Federation. All other ranks are promoted by their respective troop commandants.

== Organizations ==
=== Cossack hosts ===
The Russian Federation has twelve Cossack hosts officially recognized by the federal government; these being the Don, Kuban, Terek, Orenburg, Volga, Siberian, Yenisei, Zabaykalsky, Irkutsk, and Far Eastern; all formed in the 1990's. The Central Cossack host, including Moscow, was created in 2007 while the Black Sea Cossack host, including the Crimea, was added in 2015. These officially recognized hosts may or may not be the same as the historical hosts.

Sleeve Patch (Host emblem)	Host name	Service uniforms	Headquarters	Legislation
	Volga Cossack Host (Волжское казачье войско)		The main headquarters is located in the city of Samara 53.185963°N 50.112488°E (www.kazak-volga.ru) – Official site of the troops	Order of the President of the Russian Federation dated June 11, 1996 № 308-p
	Siberian Cossack Host (Сибирское казачье войско)		The main headquarters is located in the city of Omsk 55.009514°N 73.338696°E (www.skv-vko.narod.ru) – Official site of the troops	Decree of the President of the Russian Federation dated 12 February 1997 number 95
	Trans-Baikal Cossack Host (Забайкальское казачье войско)		The main headquarters is located in the city of Chita 52.028436°N 113.508326°E Official site of the troops	Decree of the President of the Russian Federation dated 12 February 1997 number 96
	Terek Cossack Host (Терское казачье войско)		The main headquarters is located in the city of Stavropol 45.056201°N 41.998221°E (www.terkv.ru) – Official site of the troops	Decree of the President of the Russian Federation dated 12 February 1997 number 97
	Ussuri Cossack Host (Уссурийское казачье войско)		The main headquarters is located in the city of Vladivostok 43.115622°N 131.883164°E (www.kazaki-ukv.ru) – Official site of the troops	Decree of the President of the Russian Federation dated June 17, 1997 № 611
	Don Cossack Host (Всевеликое войско Донское)		The main headquarters is located in the city of Novocherkassk 47.421028°N 40.093579°E (www.russiancossacks.ru) – Official site of the troops	Decree of the President of the Russian Federation dated June 17, 1997 № 612
	Yenisei Cossacks Host (Енисейское казачье войско)		The main headquarters is located in the city of Krasnoyarsk 56.047296°N 92.93824°E (www.eniseycossacks.ru) – Official site of the troops	Decree of the President of the Russian Federation dated June 17, 1997 № 613
	Orenburg Cossack Host (Оренбургское казачье войско)		The main headquarters is located in the city of Orenburg 51.785581°N 55.077874°E (www.ataman-ovko.ru) – Official site of the troops	Presidential Decree Rossiyskoy federations from 29 March 1998 goda № 308
	Kuban Cossack Host (Кубанское казачье войско)		The main headquarters is located in the city of Krasnodar 45.017486°N 38.966027°E (www.slavakubani.ru) – Official site of the troops	Decree of the President of the Russian Federation on April 24, 1998 № 448
	Irkutsk Cossack Host (Иркутское казачье войско)		The main headquarters is located in the city of Irkutsk 52.290219°N 104.280433°E (www.irkv.ru) – Official site of the troops	Decree of the President of the Russian Federation dated May 4, 1998 № 489
	Central Cossack Host (Центральное казачье войско)		The main headquarters is located in the city of Moscow 55.734933°N 37.409894°E (www.ckwrf.ru) – Official site of the troops	Decree of the President of the Russian Federation on May 3, 2007 № 574
	Black Sea Cossack Host (Черноморское казачье войско)		The main headquarters is located in the city of Simferopol (www.vko-chkv.ru) – Official site of the troops	2021

Note that under the new uniform regulations the open collar tunic, worn with a shirt and tie, has been replaced by a tunic with a standing collar.

=== Independent Districts ===
In addition to the military Cossack Hosts, there are other registered societies which are active auxiliaries:

Current

- Separate Northwest Cossack District (Territory of activity - Northwestern Federal District). Headquarters - St. Petersburg;
- District Cossack society "Baltic separate Cossack District - Baltic Cossack Union" (Territory of activity - the Kaliningrad region). Headquarters - Kaliningrad;

Former

- District Cossack society "Sevastopol Cossack District '(Territory of activity - Sevastopol). Headquarters - Sevastopol.
- Crimean Cossack District Society "Crimean Cossack troops" (Territory of activity, Republic of Crimea),. Headquarters - Simferopol.

Both of the above last two were integrated into the Black Sea Cossack host in 2015.

== Cossack ranks and insignia ==
Officers

The rank insignia of commissioned officers.

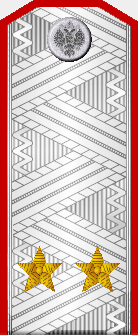
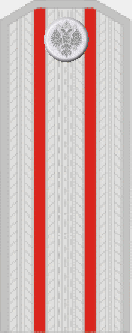
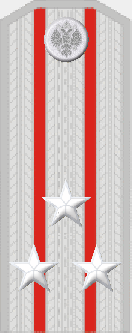
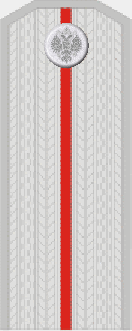
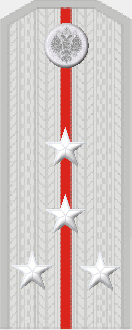
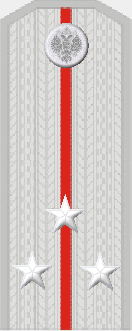
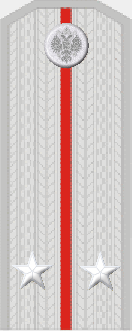
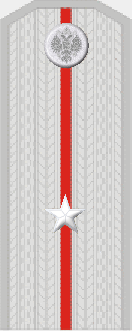
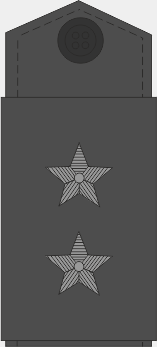
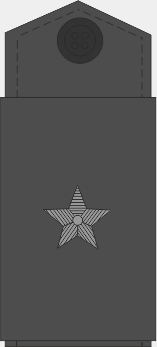
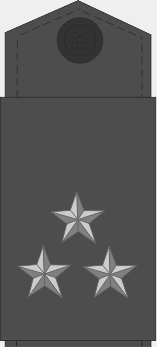
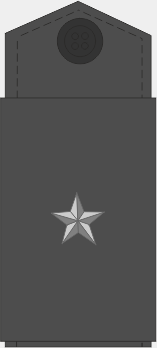
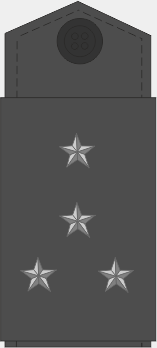
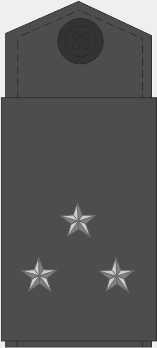
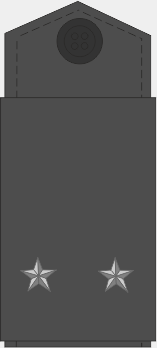
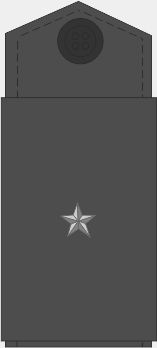
Rank group	General / flag officers	Senior officers			Junior officers
Registered Cossacks of the Russian Federation
Registered Cossacks of the Russian Federation	Казáчий генéрал Kazáchiy generál	Казáчий полкóвник Kazáchiy polkóvnik	Войсковóй старшинá Vojskovói starshiná	Есаýл; Yesaúl	Подъесаýл; Podyesaúl	Сóтник; Sótnik	Хорýнжий; Khorúnzhyi	Подхорýнжий; Podkhorúnzhiy
Field uniform
Army equivalent	Генера́л-лейтена́нт; Generál-leytenánt	Полко́вник; Polkóvnik	Подполко́вник; Podpolkóvnik	Майо́р; Majór	Kапита́н; Kapitán	Старший лейтена́нт Stárshiy leytenánt	Лейтенант; Leytenant	Mла́дший лейтена́нт Mládshiy leytenánt
Rank group	General/flag officers	Senior officers			Junior officers

Other ranks

The rank insignia of non-commissioned officers and enlisted personnel.

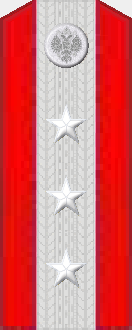
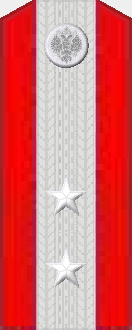
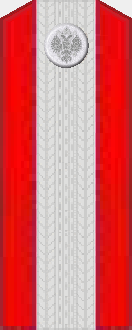
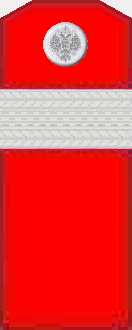
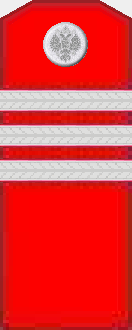
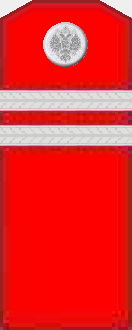
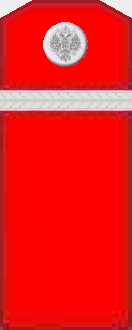
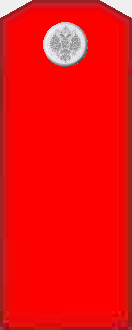
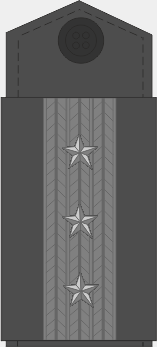
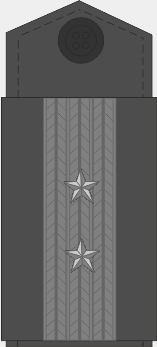
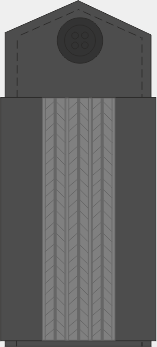
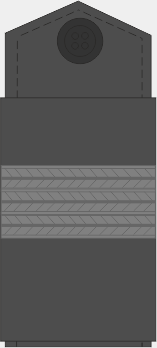
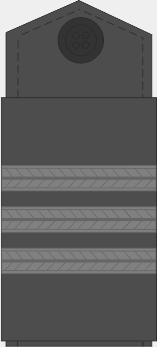
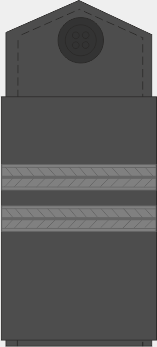
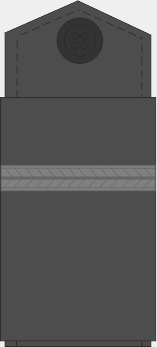
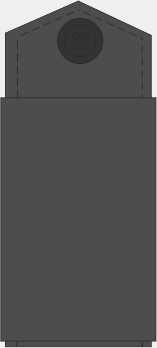
Rank group	Senior NCOs						Junior NCOs	Enlisted
Registered Cossacks of the Russian Federation
Registered Cossacks of the Russian Federation	Стáрший вáхмистр Stárshiy váhmistr	Вáхмистр; Váhmistr	Млáдший вáхмистр Mládshiy váhmistr	Стáрший урядник Stárshiy Uryádnik	Урядник; Uryádnik	Млáдший урядник Mládshiy Uryádnik	Прикáзный; Prikáznyi	Казáк; Kazák
Field uniform
Army equivalent	Ста́рший пра́порщик Stárshiy práporshchik	Пра́порщик; Práporshchyk	Старшина́ Starshyná	Ста́рший сержа́нт Stárshiy serzhánt	Сержа́нт; Serzhánt	Мла́дший сержа́нт Mládshiy serzhánt	Ефре́йтор; Efréĭtor	Рядово́й; Ryadovóy
Rank group	Senior NCOs						Junior NCOs	Enlisted

== See also ==
- History of the Cossacks
