= Dmitry Pokrass =

Soviet composer (1899–1978)

- Дмитрий Покрасс
- Born: 7 November 1899; Kiev, Russian Empire
- Died: 20 December 1978 (aged 79); Moscow, Soviet Union

Dmitry Yakovlevich Pokrass (Russian: Дми́трий Я́ковлевич Покра́сс; 7 November 1899 – 20 December 1978) was a Soviet composer, conductor and pianist. He composed popular music and scores for theatre and films, including in collaboration with his brothers. In 1975, he received the title of People's Artist of the USSR.

== Biography ==
=== Early years and education ===
Pokrass was born to a Jewish family in Kiev. At eight years of age, Dmitry Pokrass began performing as a means of earning money. He declaimed poetry, beating off a chechotka. Touring cities, he absorbed the music of the suburbs of old Kiev, of military bands, Jewish weddings and celebrations, the cinema, synagogue services, and cheerful Ukrainian dances. From 1914 to 1917, Pokrass studied piano at the Petrograd Conservatory. As a student, he composed romances and songs for actors of a variety show. Has published a series of romances "Irmochka" ("The Grimaces of Life") with the description: "Intimate cabaret songs in the style of Kremer, Vertinsky, Sabinin, Henkin". In the music of romances, he copied the stylistic manners of known actors, using the turns of fashionable tangos and other dances. He wrote songs of the "intimate genre" to be performed by Gipsy singer V. Shuysky: "The Bashful Tea Rose", "You Have Smiled at Me", "Warrant Officer Johns", and "Tango Dolores" (lyrics by P.German and O.Osenin). In 1917, he returned to Kiev, where he found work as an accompanist. In 1919, he worked at the "One-eyed Jimmy" variety theatre in Rostov-on-Don.

=== Military career ===
In 1919–1921, Pokrass served in the 1st Cavalry. In honour of the taking of Rostov by the First Cavalry, he wrote the song which gained national popularity, "Budyonny's March" (1920, lyrics by A.d'Aktilj). To his fellow soldiers of the First Cavalry, he dedicated further compositions: "Hey, hey, saddle the Horses" (D. Bednogo), a cantata "Forward" and a military march, "Red Cavalrymen", both with lyrics by S.Minin.

=== Professional career ===
Relocating to Moscow in 1923, Pokrass worked in different genres of variety music. He wrote music for theatres of miniatures and a cabaret, accompanied a Gypsy chorus, the Gypsy song performers E.Dobero and O.Vargina. Pokrass tried to overcome the stale character of the variety genre in romances by using lyrics of "highbrow" poetry by Alexander Blok ("I am at Your Feet"), Igor Severyanin ("I Feel How Flowers Fall"), and others.

From 1923 to 1926, Pokrass served as the principal conductor and musical director of the Moscow theatres "Oriental Carpets" and "Hermitage".

In 1940, Pokrass became a member of the Communist Party of the Soviet Union.

From 1926 to 1936, he was the principal conductor and musical director of the Moscow music hall. From 1932 to 1954, he worked in collaboration with his brother,Daniil. From 1936 to 1972, he was the artistic director of the Variety Orchestra of the Central House of Culture of Railway Workers (TsDKZh). He composed songs, film scores, and incidental music for the theatre, as well as military marches such as the March of the Soviet Tankmen. After Daniel's death, Dmitry wrote the "March of the Motorized Infantry" (lyrics by Yevgeniy Dolmatovsky, 1957), "Great City" ("A Song about Moscow", the Newcomer's Poems, 1974), (Lyuba, Lyubushka, Lyubov; lyrics by P. Gradov), "My Small Hometown" (lyrics by M. Svetlov, 1975), "The March of BAM" (lyrics by M. Vershinin, 1975). He also composed music for the stage plays "Red Devilkins" (1950) and "Konarmiya" (1950), works for the violin, and romances.
