= At War as at War =

- Directed by: Viktor Tregubovich
- Written by: Viktor Kurochkin
- Produced by: Vladimir Besprozvanny
- Starring: Mikhail Kononov; Oleg Borisov
- Cinematography: Yevgeny Mezentsev
- Music by: Georgy Portnov
- Production company: Lenfilm
- Release date: 23 February 1969
- Running time: 90 min
- Country: Soviet Union
- Language: Russian

At War as at War (Russian: На войне как на войне, romanized: Na voyne, kak na voyne) is a 1969 Soviet World War II film directed by Viktor Tregubovich. The film had 20 million theatre admissions.

== Plot ==
The dedication in the opening credits reads:

To the fallen and living soldiers of the 3rd Guards Tank Army under Marshal Pavel Semenovich Rybalko.

The film depicts the combat routine of a crew operating a self-propelled gun during the Liberation of Right-Bank Ukraine in 1944.

The protagonist, Junior Lieutenant Maleshkin, is a recently graduated officer assigned to command a SU-100 self-propelled gun (referred to as an SU-85 in the original book). His crew consists of older, more battle-hardened soldiers whose experience often overshadows his authority. This dynamic creates tension, as Maleshkin struggles to assert himself while facing frequent challenges to his leadership. His relationship with the crew alternates between conflict and reconciliation, and his battery commander remains critical of his perceived ineptitude, threatening to relieve him of command.

Maleshkin’s crew frequently encounters misfortunes, ranging from minor incidents, such as the driver appearing disheveled, to serious issues like discovering a live grenade with its pin removed inside the vehicle or mechanical failures during critical moments.

Despite these setbacks, the crew rises to the occasion during their first battle. Joined by infantryman Gromykhalo, they unexpectedly find themselves leading an assault and later isolated behind enemy lines. The self-propelled gun crew, tasked with following the tanks per regulations, instead engages superior enemy forces heroically, ensuring victory in the battle. However, the skirmish comes at a cost, as the gunner, Mikhail Domeshek, is killed in action.

== Cast ==
- Mikhail Kononov as 2nd Lt. Alexander Alexandrovich Maleshkin
- Oleg Borisov as Sgt. Mikhail Domeshek
- Victor Pavlov as Starshina Grigory Shcherbak
- Fyodor Odinokov as Gefreiter Osip Byankin
- Boris Tabarovsky as Lt. Bezzubtsev
- Mikhail Gluzsky as Col. Dey
- Pyotr Lyubeshkin as Timofei Vasilievich Ovsyannikov
- Valentin Zubkov as Col. Basov
- Boris Arakelov as 2nd Lt. Cheginichka
- German Kolushkin as Lt. Pavel Telenkov
- Pyotr Gorin as Cpt. Sergachyov
- Boris Sichkin as Sr. Lt. Selivanov
- Yuriy Dubrovin as private Gromykhalo
- Irina Zamotina as Antonina Vasilyevna

The film was Irina Zamotina's acting debut.

== See also ==
- Soviet Tankmen's Song
