= All-Russian Cossack Society =

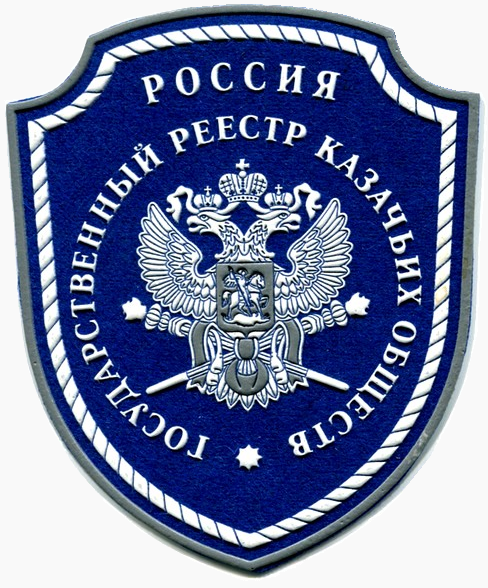
All-Russian Cossack Society

The All-Russian Cossack Society (Russian: Всероссийское казачье общество) is a government sponsored Cossack advocacy organization in the Russian Federation. It is responsible for the coordination of activities between the 11 registered Cossack hosts. In particular, it works in the spheres of patriotic education and the continuing historical Cossack customs and traditions. Both registered and non-registered Cossack organizations can be part of the society. It is headed by the Society Ataman, Cossack General Vitaly Kuznetsov.

== History ==
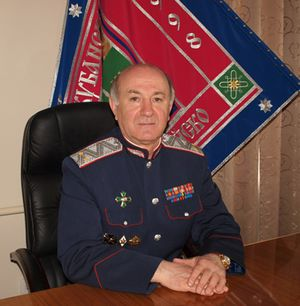
Ataman Nikolai Doluda.

On 4 November 2019, Russian President Vladimir Putin appointed Kuban Vice Governor and Kuban Cossack Host Ataman Nikolai Doluda as Ataman of the Society. Cossack General Doluda was appointed two years after the atamans and the Cossacks created it in October 2017. The idea was first proposed in 1994. On 27 November 2018, delegates of the Constitutive Assembly voted for the establishment of the society and adopted its official statute. Doluda was then nominated for head of the society, in which he was backed by the Presidential Council on Cossack Affairs. In November 2023, Doluda resigned voluntarily to focus on legislative work. The head of the Terek Cossack Society, General Vitaly Kuznetsov, was appointed in his place.

== Authority ==
In July 2019, the State Duma voted to give President Putin the exclusive right to appoint and remove the Society Ataman, as well as to require that all Cossack units obey the procedures of the society.

== Public activities ==
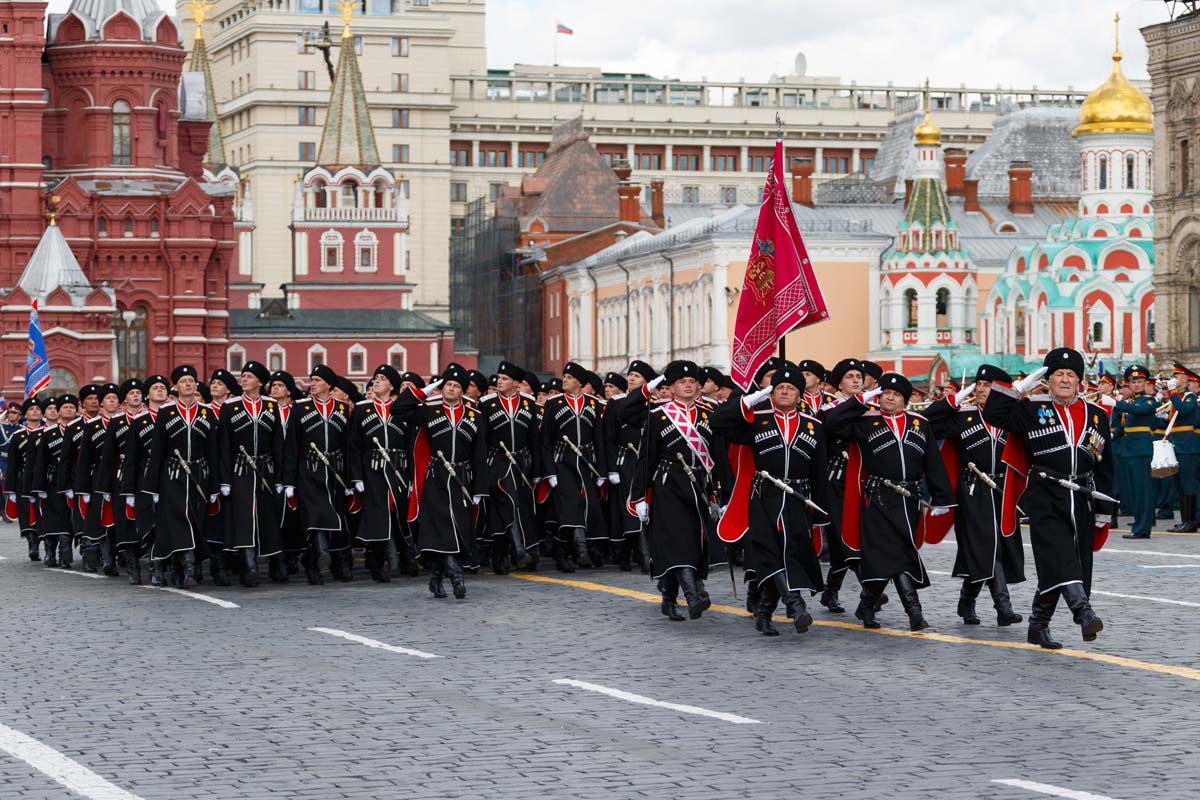
Kuban Cossacks, representing the society with its unit banner, on Red Square during the 2021 Moscow Victory Day Parade.

=== National parades ===
The 4th Guards Cossacks Cavalry Corps took part in the Moscow Victory Parade of 1945 on Red Square. This was the first time that Cossacks have appeared on such a large scale celebration in Russia. In 2015, a contingent of Kuban Cossacks led by General Doluda took part in the 70th anniversary Moscow Victory Day Parade for the first time. Although the Kuban Cossacks were not able to return to the parade for the 75th anniversary in 2020 (due to COVID-19 restrictions), a Don Cossack contingent took part in its place, representing the society and carrying a military flag handed by President Putin. General Doluda described the participation of the Cossacks in the Victory Day Parade as "an example of an unbroken spirit".

=== Krasnodar parade ===
In late April of every year, the society organizes a parade of the Kuban Cossack Army in Krasnodar, dedicated to the anniversary of the adoption of the law on the rehabilitation of the Cossacks. There is usually a traditional prayer service, before the Cossack pass along Krasnaya Street to the City Square, to which the parade begins at 12:00 am. The parade is opened by a platoon of drummers of the Novorossiysk Cossack Cadet Corps and among the participants in the parade are equestrian groups, honor guards and youth cadet corps.

== See also ==
- Registered Cossacks of the Russian Federation
