= Peter Kirichek =

Soviet singer

Peter Kirichek (Russian: Пётр Тихонович Киричек, Pyotr Tikhonovich Kirichek; 1902 — 1968) was a Soviet singer, a bass-baritone. After graduating from the Moscow Conservatory, he worked as a soloist at the Bolshoi Theater (1934–1944) and then mostly toured with programs devoted to romances and contemporary Soviet songs. He was awarded the title of Meritorious Artist of the RSFSR in 1960. Kirichek performed or recorded such songs as "March of the Soviet Tankmen" ("Марш советских танкистов"), "Anthem of the International Union of Students" ("Гимн международного союза студентов"), "Goodbye, Rocky Mountains" ("Прощайте, скалистые горы"). Composer Anatoly Novikov praised him as a real tribune and a real fighter who didn't care about the conditions under which he had to sing, who performed in factories, at field camps and on ships and gave about 1,500 concerts on the front line during the Great Patriotic War.
