= Pokrass brothers =

The Pokrass brothers were Soviet composers and siblings who collaborated with each other:

- Samuel Pokrass (1897–1939) — the elder brother; emigrated to the United States in 1920s
- Dmitry Pokrass (1899–1978)
- Daniil Pokrass (1905–1954) — the youngest brother, Soviet musician

Dmitry was the most famous of the brothers. He wrote most of his songs together with Daniil.

They also had a fourth brother:

- Arkady Pokrass — pianist and accompanist

== Selected works by the Pokrass brothers ==
- "March of the Soviet Tankmen" ("Марш советских танкистов")
- "Welcome Us, Beautiful Suomi (Finland)" ("Принимай нас, Суоми-красавица", "Suomi-kaunotar")
- "You Won't Mow Us Down with a Sharp Sabre" ("Не скосить нас саблей острой")
- "White Army, Black Baron" (The Red Army is the Strongest) - ("Белая армия, чёрный барон")
- "If Tomorrow Brings War" ("Если завтра война")
- "Red Cavalrymen" ("Красные кавалеристы")
- "Three Tankmen" ("Три танкиста")
- "I'm at Your Feet" ("Я у ног твоих")
- "I Feel How Flowers Fall" ("Я чувствую, как падают цветы")
- "Moscow in May" ("Москва майская")
- Cossacks in Berlin
