= Na pole tanki grokhotali =

Soviet military song

Na polye tanki grokhotali (Russian: На поле танки грохотали, lit. 'Across the Field Tanks Thundered') is a Soviet military song, popularized by the 1968 film At War as at War (Russian: На войне как на войне, romanized: Na voyne, kak na voyne), about the crew of an SU-100 (SU-85 in the basic novel) tank destroyer. The song melody originated from the old Russian miners' song "Sirens Sounded Alarm" ("Гудки тревожно прогудели"), popularized in the 1940 film A Great Life. The lyrics of the song were replaced during World War II.

== See also ==
- March of the Soviet Tankmen
