= Nikolai Doluda =

Russian politician (born 1952)

- Николай Долуда
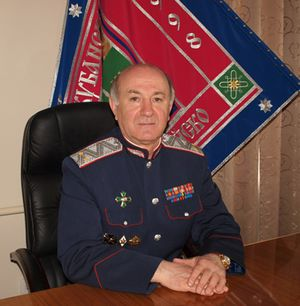

Deputy of the 8th State Duma
- Incumbent
- Assumed office 19 September 2021

Vice-Governor of the Krasnodar Krai
- In office 2006 – 25 January 2020

Ataman of the Kuban Cossack army
- In office 6 February 2008 – 25 January 2020

Personal details
- Born: 10 June 1952 (age 74) Myroliubovka, Kharkov Oblast, Ukrainian SSR, USSR
- Party: United Russia
- Education: Rostov State University of Economics

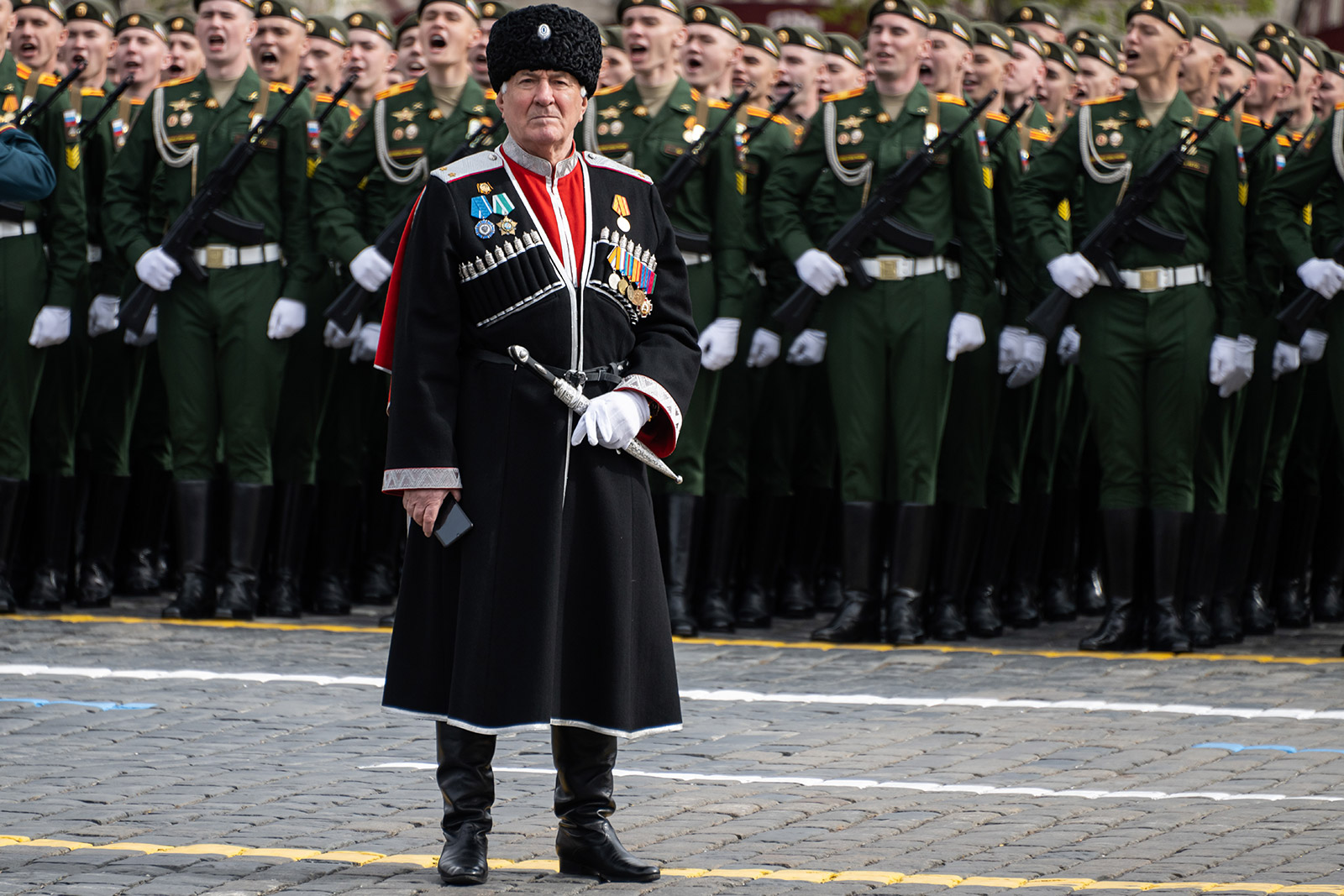
At the 2022 Moscow Victory Day Parade.

Nikolai Aleksandrovich Doluda (Russian: Никола́й Алекса́ндрович Долу́да; Ukrainian: Микола Олександрович Долуда, romanized: Mykola Oleksandrovych Doluda) is a Soviet Ukrainian-born Russian political figure and a deputy the 8th State Duma. In 1998 he held the position of Deputy Mayor of the city of Yeysk. In 2001, he started working at the administration of the Krasnodar Krai. On 24 May 2006 he was appointed Deputy Governor of the Krasnodar Krai. In November 2007, Nikolai Doluda was elected ataman of the Kuban Cossack army. Three years later, he headed the Council of military atamans. He left the post in 2020 to become the new head of the All-Russian Cossack Society. In November 2023, he resigned from his post of his own free will to focus on developing legislation on the Cossacks.

Since 2021, he has served as a deputy of the 8th State Duma.

== Sanctions ==
On 24 March 2022, the United States Treasury sanctioned him in response to the 2022 Russian invasion of Ukraine.

He was sanctioned by the UK government in 2022 in relation to the Russo-Ukrainian War.

== Awards ==
=== State ===
- Order of Friendship (2012)
- Medal of the Order "For Merit to the Fatherland," 2nd class (April 3, 2012)
- Jubilee Medal "60 Years of Victory in the Great Patriotic War of 1941–1945"

=== Departmental ===
- Medal "For the Return of Crimea" (Ministry of Defence of Russia)
- Medal "For Strengthening the State Information Security System," 2nd class

=== Regional ===
- Medal "Hero of Labour of Kuban" (March 26, 2014) — for high professionalism and major personal contribution to the preparation of the XXII Olympic Winter Games and the XI Paralympic Winter Games in Sochi
- Order of the Republic of Crimea "For Loyalty to Duty" (March 13, 2015) — for courage, patriotism, active socio-political activity, personal contribution to strengthening unity, and the development and prosperity of the Republic of Crimea, and in connection with the Day of the Reunification of Crimea with Russia
