= March of the Soviet Tankmen =

Song by Peter Kirichek
- Composer: Pokrass brothers
- Lyricist: Boris Laskin

Audio
- "March of the Soviet Tankmen" on YouTube

The "March of the Soviet Tankmen" (Russian: Марш советских танкистов, romanized: Marsh sovetskikh tankistov) is a 1939 Soviet military march song composed by the Pokrass brothers and with lyrics by Boris Savelyevich Laskin (Борис Савельевич Ласкин), whose debut was in the 1939 movie Tractor Drivers, in which the role of Klim Yarko is played by Nikolai Kryuchkov. Later the song was used in World War II short titled "Fascist Jackboots Shall Not Trample Our Motherland" by Ivanov-Vano (1941). Valery Dunaevsky commented that the song "was full of fighting spirit" in his book A Daughter of the "Enemy of the People" (2015).

== Lyrics ==
Russian original

Броня крепка, и танки наши быстры,
и наши люди мужества полны!
В строю стоят советские танкисты,
своей великой Родины сыны!

Припев:
Гремя огнём, сверкая блеском стали,
пойдут машины в яростный поход!
Когда нас в бой пошлёт товарищ Сталин,
и первый маршал в бой нас поведёт!

Заводов труд, и труд колхозных пашен
мы защитим, страну свою храня!
Ударной силой орудийных башен
и быстротой, и натиском огня!

Припев

Пусть помнит враг, укрывшийся в засаде:
мы начеку, мы за врагом следим!
Чужой земли мы не хотим ни пяди,
но и своей вершка не отдадим!

Припев

А если к нам полезет враг матёрый,
он будет бит повсюду и везде!
Тогда нажмут водители стартёры,
и по лесам, по сопкам, по воде!

Припев

Romanization of Russian

Bronja krepka, i tanki naši bystry,
i naši ljudi mužestva polny!
V stroju stojat, Sovetskije tankisty,
svojej velikoj Rodiny syny!

Pripev:
Gremja ognjom, sverkaja bleskom stali,
pojdut mašiny v jarostnyj pohod!
Kogda nas v boj pošljot tovarišč Stalin,
i pervyj maršal v boj nas povedjot!

Zavodov trud, i trud kolhoznyh pašen,
my začitim, stranu svoju hranja!
Udarnoj siloj, orudijnyh bašen,
i bystrotoj, i natiskom ognja!

Pripev

Pustj pomnit vrag, ukryvšijsja v zasade:
my načeku, my za vragom sledim!
Čužoj zemli, my ne hotim ni pjadi,
no i svojej, verška ne otdadim!

Pripev

A jesli k nam, polezet vrag matjoryj,
on budet bit, povsjudu i vezde!
Togda nažmut, voditeli startjory,
i po lesam, po sopkam, po vode!

Pripev

English translation

Hard is our armour, fast are our tanks,
full of courage are our men!
Ready for action are the Soviet tankmen,
sons of their Great Motherland!

Chorus:
Thunderin' with fire, glintin' with steel,
the tanks shall begin a harsh campaign!
When we're called to battle by Comrade Stalin,
the First Marshal shall lead us in this battle!

In keepin' our country, we guard
the work of factories and farms!
By power of our gun turrets,
by our speed and pressure of fire!

Chorus

Let the foe hidden in ambush remember:
for him we watch, on guard we are!
We want not a foot of foreign land,
but we for sure ain't givin' up our land!

Chorus

But if the inveterate foe attacks us,
we'll defeat him wherever he is!
Tankdrivers will start the engines,
drive through forests, mountains, and on seas!

Chorus

== See also ==
- "Soviet Tankmen's Song"
