= VKPO uniform =

Russian military layered clothing system

The Russian all season set of field uniforms (VKPO; (Note: Russian: Всесезонный комплект полевого обмундирования (ВКПО), romanized: Vsesezonnyy komplekt polevogo obmundirovaniya (VKPO), lit. 'All-season set of field uniforms') formerly VKBO) (Note: Russian: Всесезонный комплект базового обмундирования, romanized: Vsesezonnyy komplekt bazovogo obmundirovaniya, lit. 'All-season basic kit') is a layered clothing system (popularly known as капуста/kapusta "cabbage") manufactured by the Russian BTK Group and adopted as a standard field uniform by the Russian military, designed for use at temperatures from +15 °C (59 °F) to −40 °C (−40 °F).

The initial VKPO kit is in EMR but in 2023, Russia has adopted Multicam as a standard camouflage of its new Army field uniform kit, VKPO 2.0, VKPO 3.0 and VKPO 4.0.

== Description ==
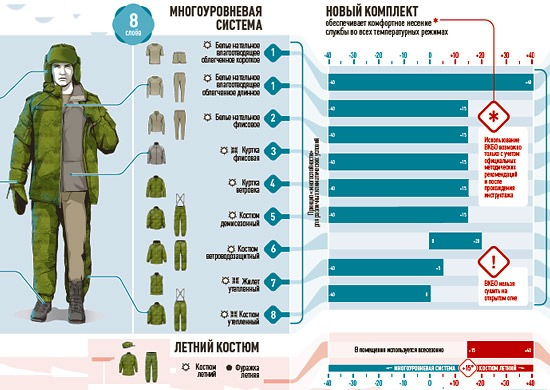
VKPO All-season set of the Russian army.

The full set of VKPO (VKBO) is a multi-level system that includes up to eight layers of clothing. The use of various combinations of these layers makes it possible to provide comfortable work for a serviceman under different weather conditions with different physical loads. The minimum composition of the clothes of the VKPO kit is designed to work at temperatures above + 15 °C.

In the maximally insulated VKPO (VKBO) configuration it protects from temperatures down to -40 °C. The ability to combine layers in accordance with the weather and the planned intensity of work is one of the main advantages multigrade set of field uniforms.

== The layers ==
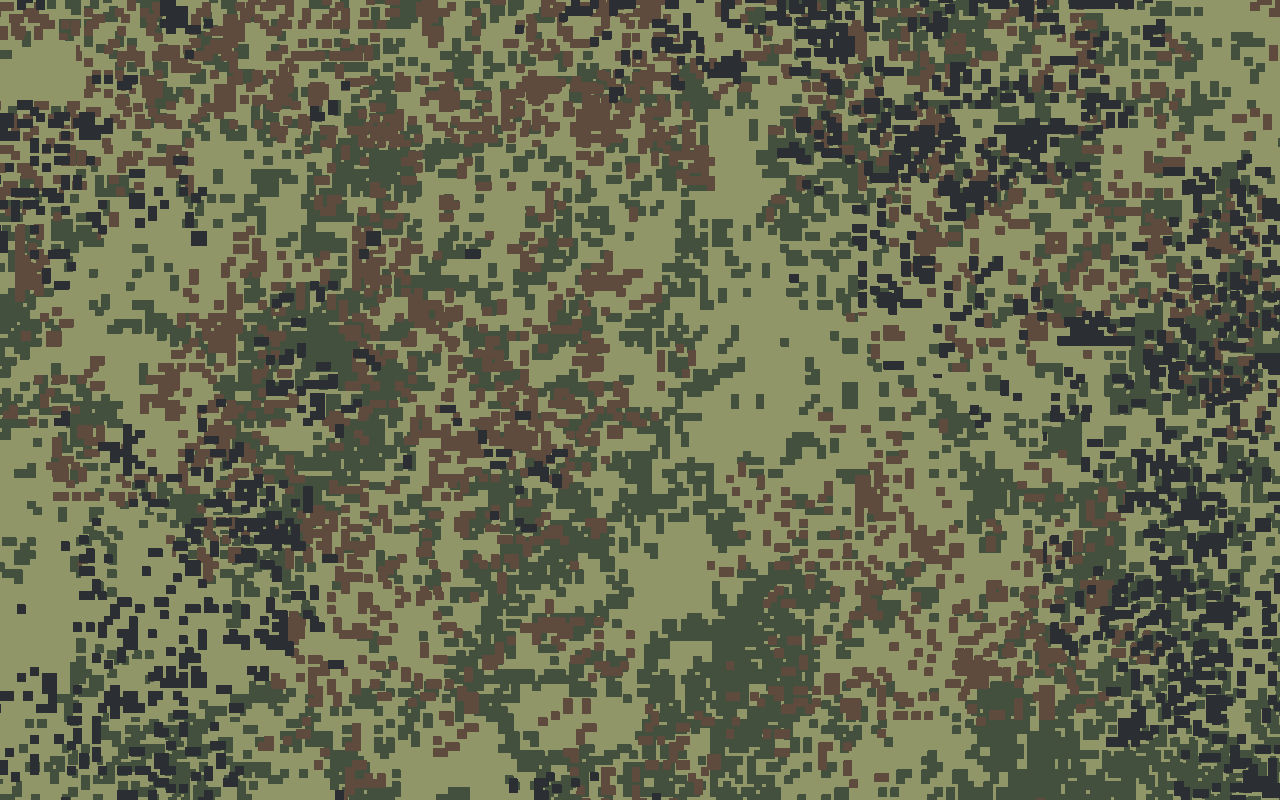
EMR camouflage pattern

All layers are worn with the basic two-piece EMR camouflage suit.

Layers 1 and 2 are worn under the EMR summer suit.

- Layer 1: Base layer of two types of underwear both made of polyester,
  - a warm-weather set consisting of a khaki crew neck undershirt and boxer-brief shorts and
  - a cool-weather long underwear set with long legs and long sleeves
- Layer 2: fleece long underwear with long legs and long sleeves worn over Layer 1,

Layers 3 through 8 are worn over the EMR summer suit.

- Layer 3: Fleece jacket, in khaki, worn over the EMR summer camouflage suit,
- Layer 4: Windbreaker Jacket in EMR camouflage,
- Layer 5: two-piece "Demi-Season" Suit consisting of a water resistant jacket and suspendered trousers,
- Layer 6: two-piece water proof and wind proof suit in EMR camouflage,
- Layer 7: an insulated, water and wind resistant vest in EMR camouflage worn typically over Layer 5 or Layer 6,
- Layer 8: essentially the "shinel (greatcoat)" of the modern Russian army, though it is designed to be worn with many layers underneath, in EMR camouflage. It serves as both an insulation layer and a shell layer. Per regulations, it is worn with the VKPO winter cap (the modern Ushanka), VKPO winter mittens, and VKPO winter boots.

The VKPO clothing system includes all in EMR unless otherwise noted:

- VKPO winter ushanka hat
- VKPO Balaklava in black or EMR
- VKPO mittens
- VKPO Haversack
- VKPO Patrol cap
- VKPO tube scarf
- VKPO belt in black or olive nylon webbing
- VKPO black leather combat boots in summer and winter versions.
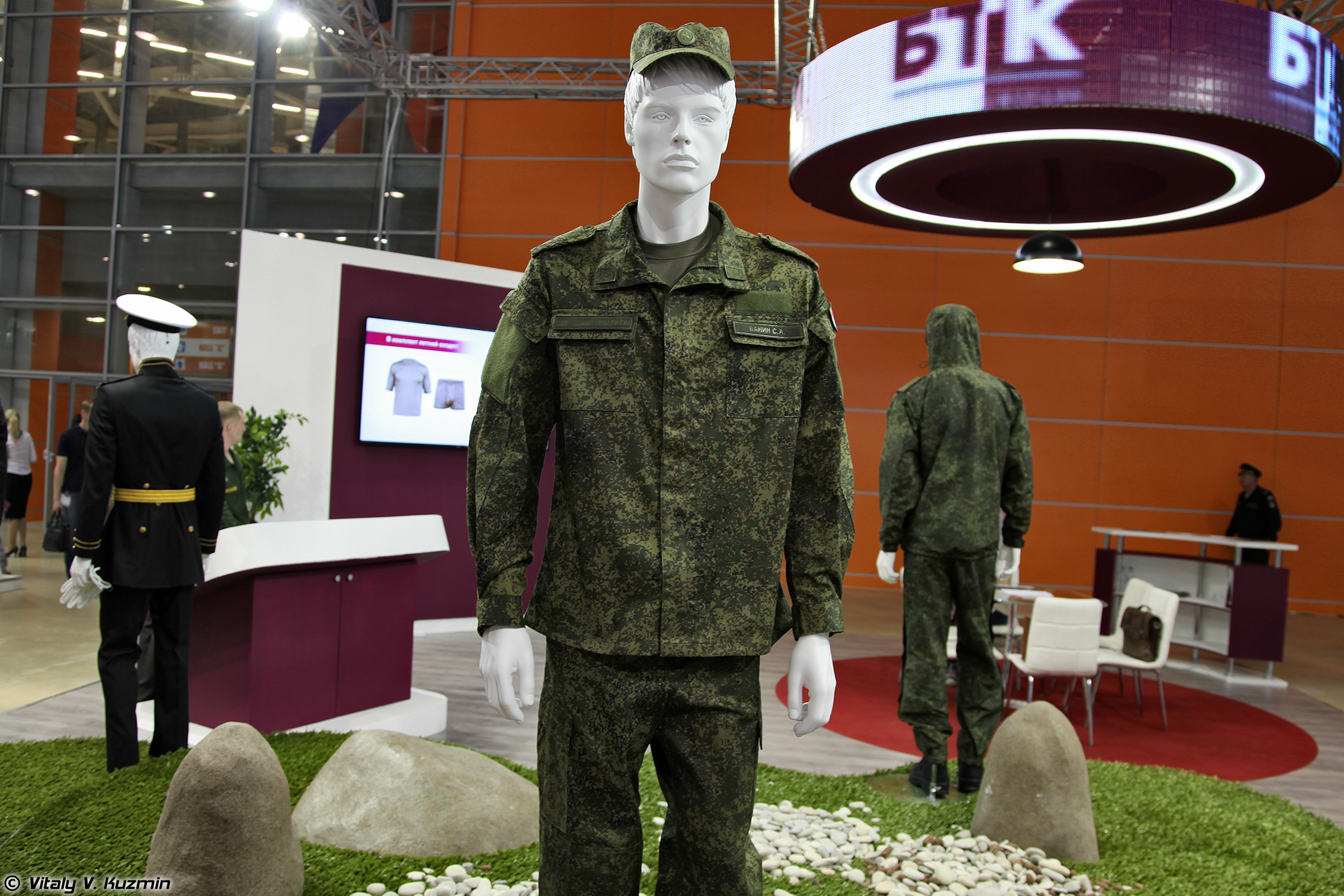
EMR Summer uniform

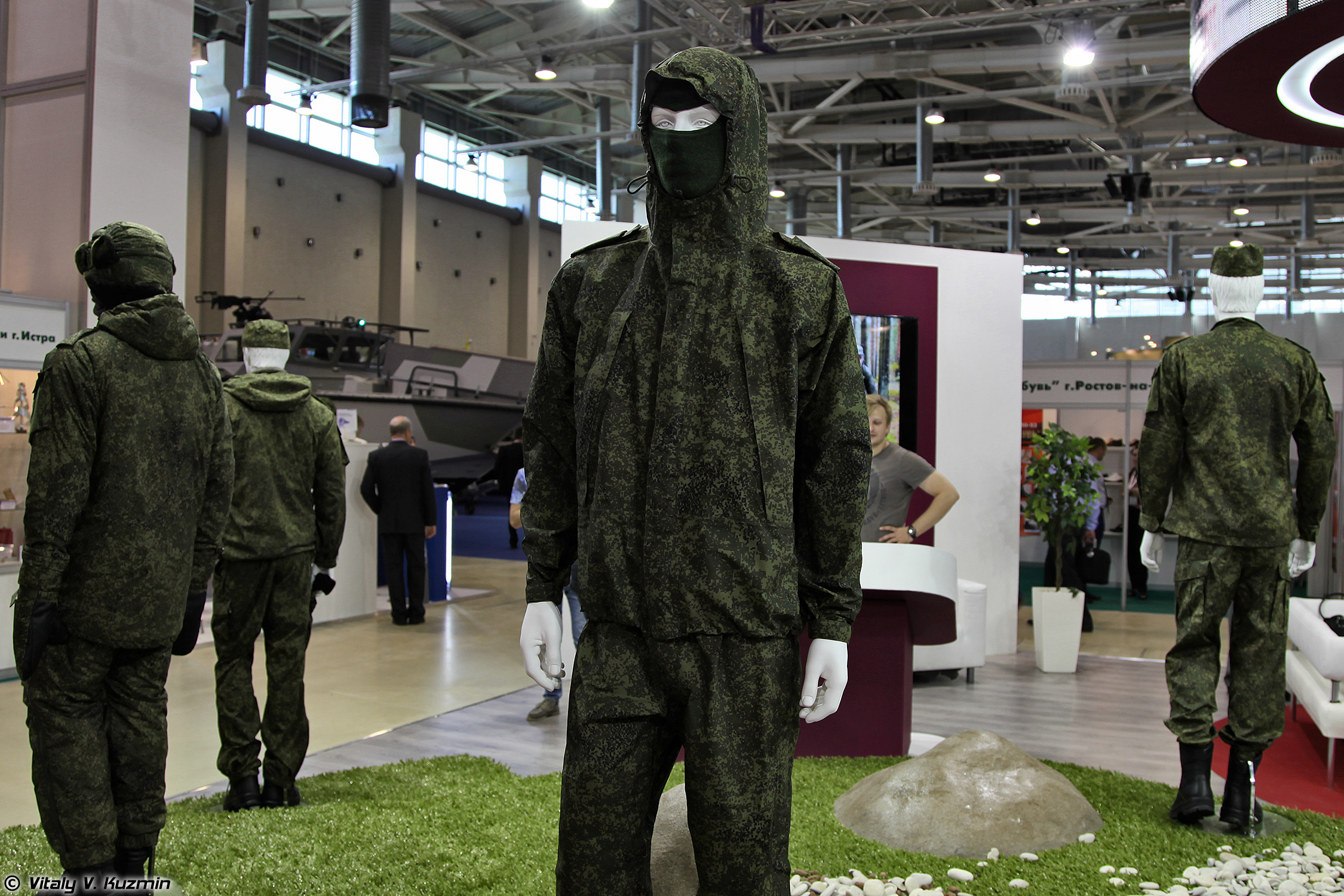
Layer 6

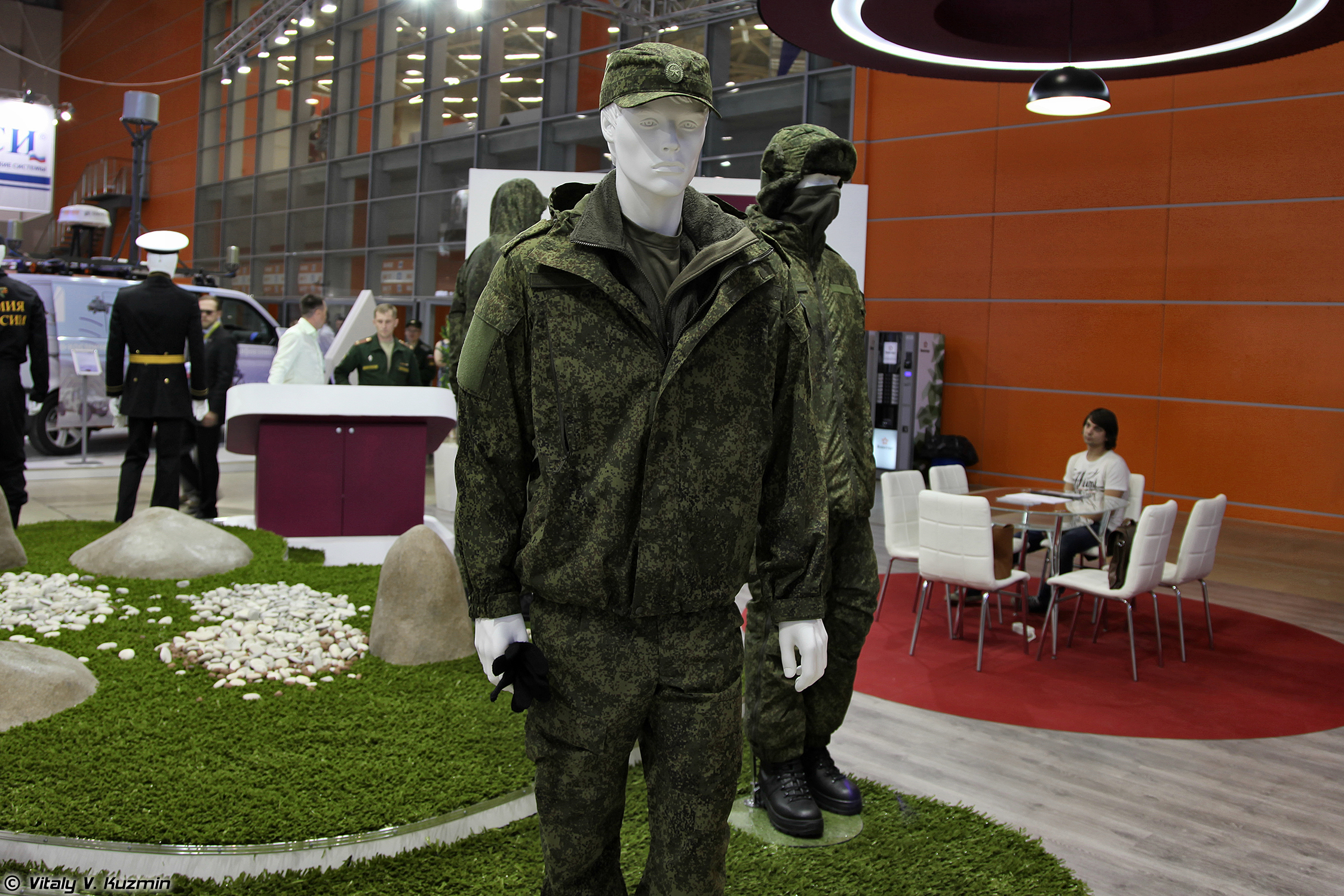
Layer 5

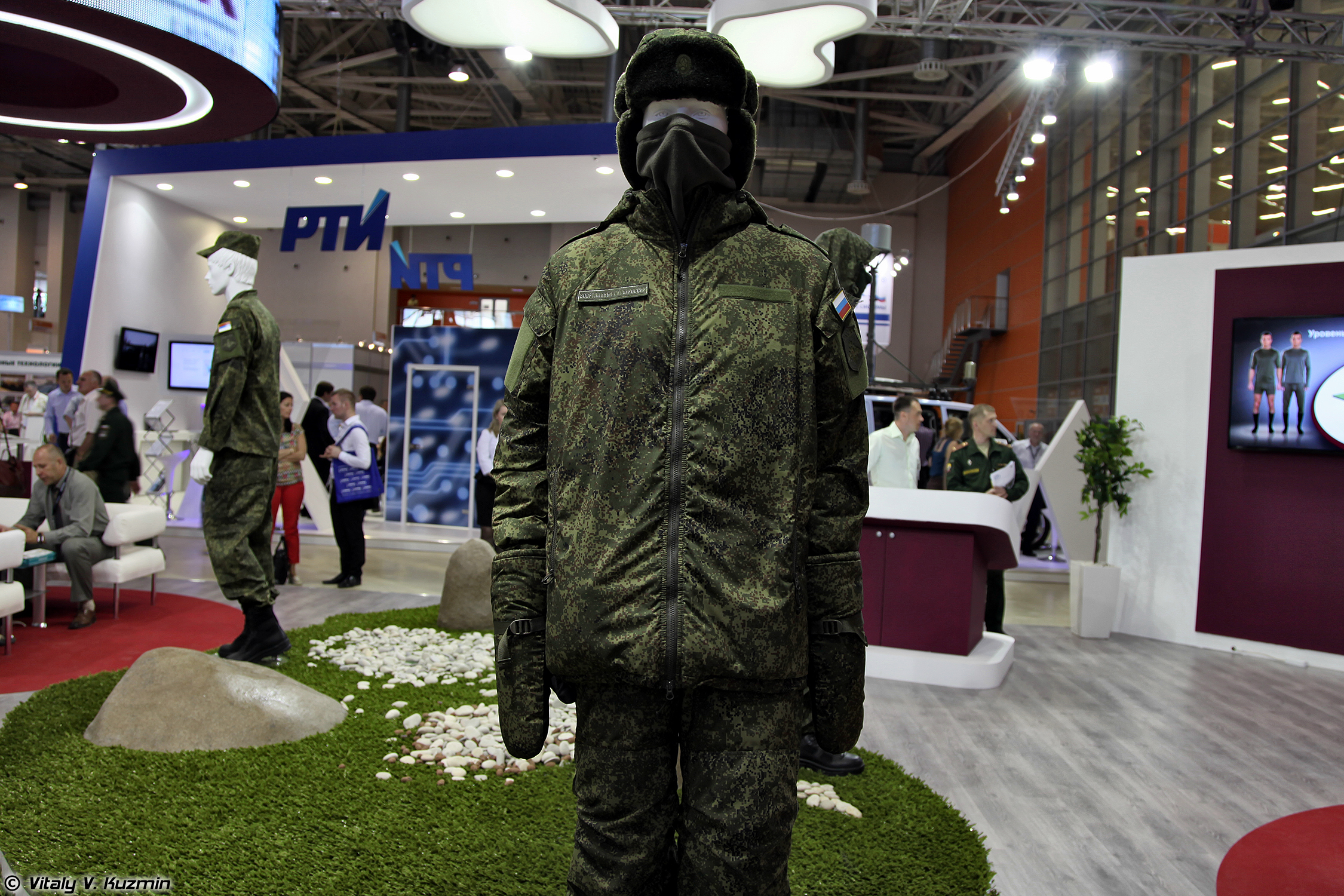
Layer 8

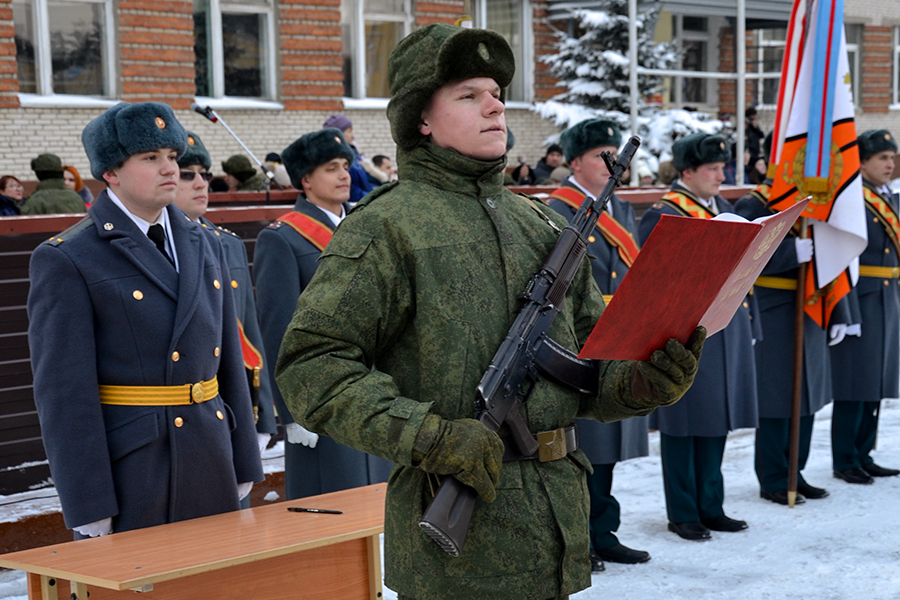
Soldier in Yudashkin Suit

== See also ==
- Extended Cold Weather Clothing System - the US Army's equivalent
