= EMR camouflage =

Russian military digital camouflage pattern

EMR Camouflage
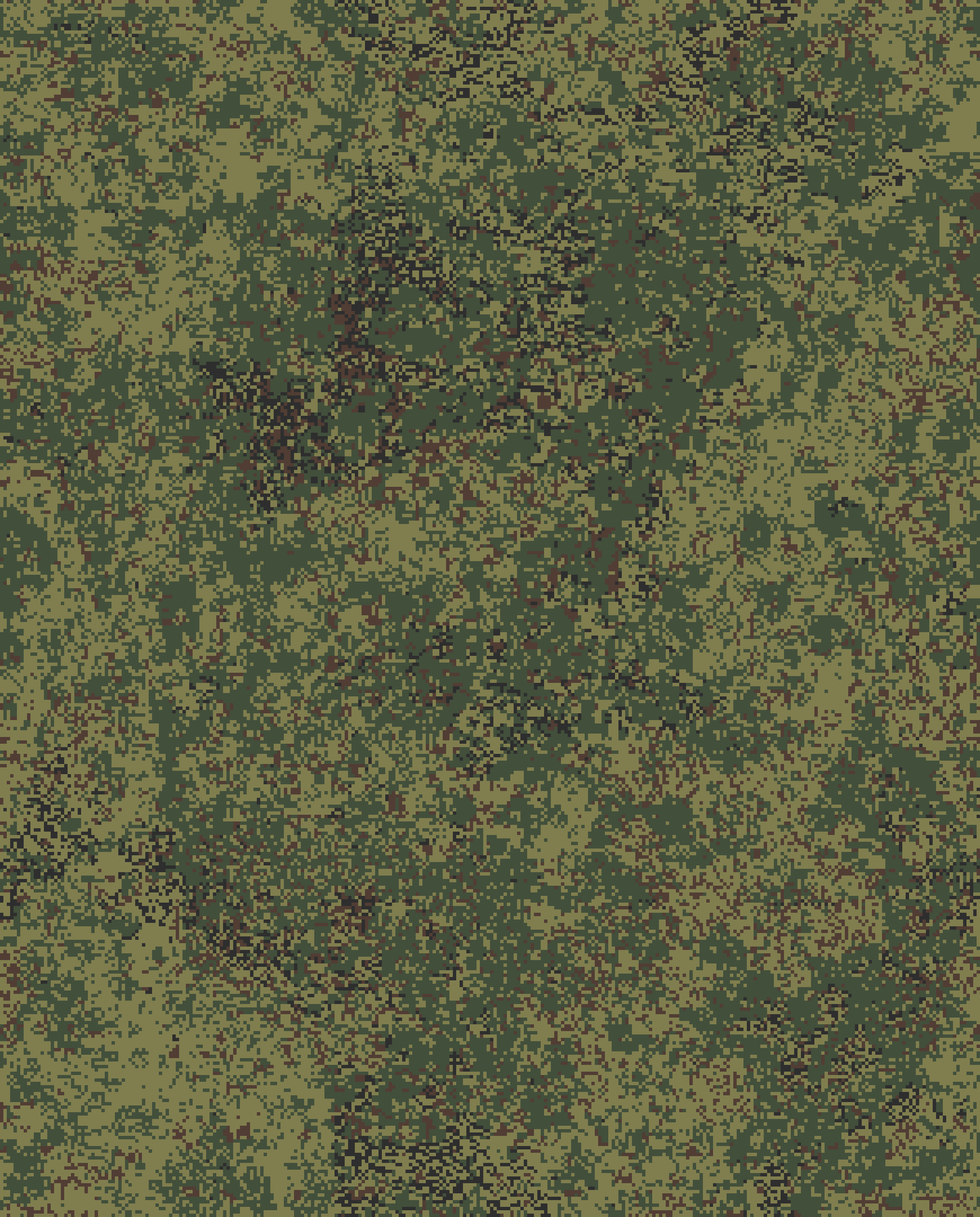
- Most common variant of EMR, as seen on VKPO suits.
- Type: Military camouflage pattern
- Place of origin: Russia

Service history
- Used by: See Users
- Wars: Russo-Ukrainian War; Russian invasion of Crimea; War in Donbas; Russian invasion of Ukraine; Syrian Civil War; 2022 Kyrgyzstan–Tajikistan clashes

Production history
- Designer: 15 Central Research Institute, Russian Ministry of Defense
- Designed: 2008
- Manufacturer: AO Voentorg; BTK Group
- Produced: 2008–present
- Variants: Leto (summer); Sever (northern region)

The EMR (Russian: Единая маскировочная расцветка [ЕМР], romanized: Edinaya maskirovochnaya rascvetka [EMR]) or Universal Camouflage Colorway in English, is a military camouflage pattern in use by the Russian Armed Forces. It is sometimes referred to by the unofficial nicknames RUSPAT, Tetris, Tsifra and Digital Flora. EMR camouflage is the standard camouflage pattern of the Russian Military's V.K.B.O. All-Season Uniform.

Developed as a single camouflage pattern, EMR was developed at 15 Central Research Institute of the Ministry of Defence of the Russian Federation as a universal pattern. Depending on the color palette, it can be adapted to a variety of terrain conditions with good camouflage properties. It was the main pattern of the Ratnik combat system.

The Armed Forces of Belarus uses it as their standard camouflage. However, it is believed that it uses a slightly different pattern. The EMR has also been adopted by a number of Russian-backed partially-recognized statelets, militias, and paramilitary forces.

== History ==
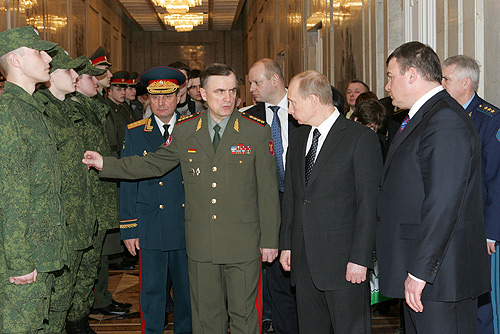
President of Russia Vladimir Putin with Defence Minister Anatoly Serdyukov inspecting the new EMR camouflage uniforms, January 2008

The camouflage appeared in 2008 after a fundamental decision was made to change Flora. Initially, it was assumed that since "Flora" roughly corresponds to the American Woodland, which in the US Armed Forces was changed to digital camouflages, then the Russian Armed Forces should keep up with this process. Full-scale adoption began in 2011.

The creation of the EMR was heavily influenced by the German Flecktarn camouflage, the developers of which managed to "combine the incompatible": small spots that perform an imitation function are combined in this color scheme so that they form groups of large spots that perform a deforming function.

The developers of EMR followed the same path, taking into account the results of studies that showed the effectiveness of extremely small ("pixel") spots as constituent elements of the texture pattern.

In 2016, Russian troops in Syria were reported to be wearing a desert variant of the EMR.

It was reported in 2017 that Russian soldiers in the National Guard would discontinue using EMR and instead, use Izlom or Moss-based camouflage patterns instead.

The EMR uniform kit is also used for some ceremonial purposes. However, significant variations not covered by the official uniform code exist when used for ceremonial purposes including; white parade gloves, white leather buckled parade belts, white aiguillettes, coloured branch shoulder boards, branch-distinctive lapel badges, pressed-collar buttoned jackets as opposed to the zipper jacket used in the standard uniform kit, and berets used as the main headdress as opposed to patrol caps or peaked caps.

Occasionally jackboots are issued for foot columns and colour guards wearing EMR. Other variations, such as office uniforms, by different manufacturers, such as Splav, not covered by the official uniform code are tolerated.

== Design ==
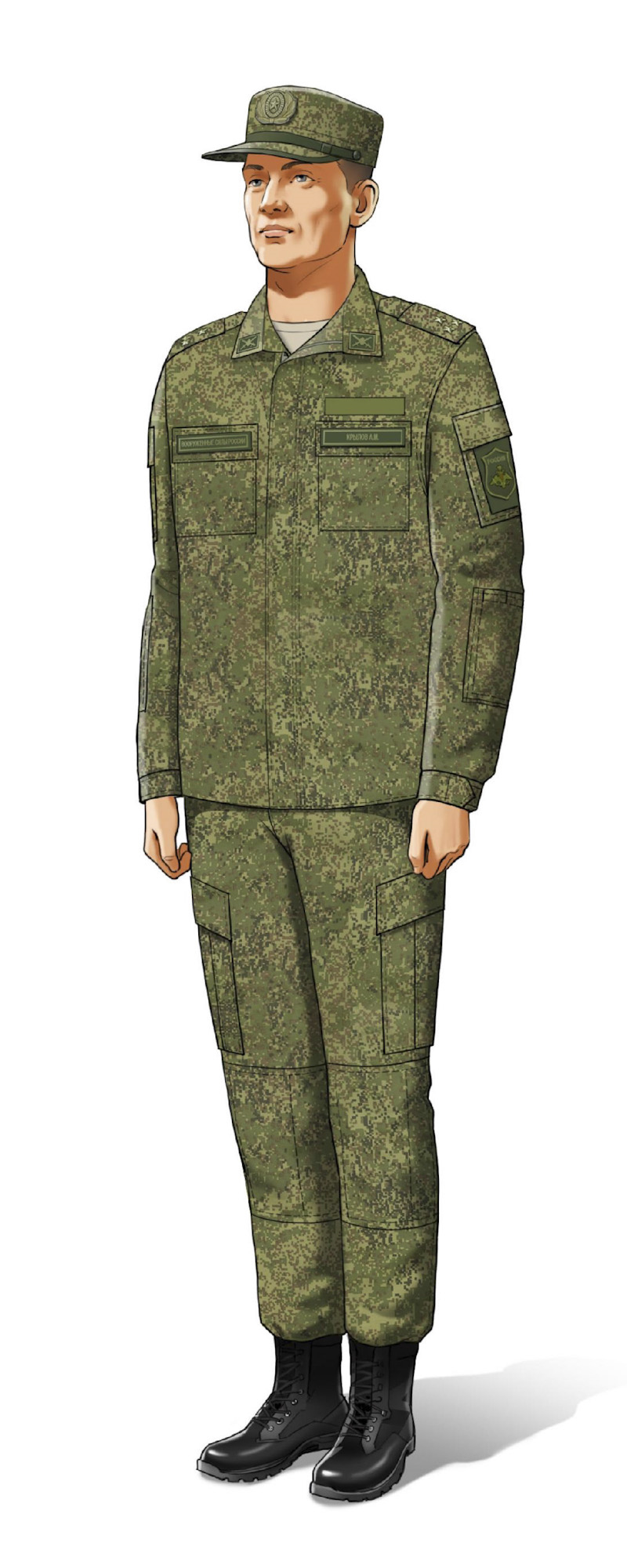
1st pattern field uniform in EMR camouflage pattern

The basic uniform is as follows:

- The straight cut jacket has a standing collar (early versions have a stand-and-fall collar), is closed by a central zipper, has two breast patch pockets with flaps with hidden button closures, the back has two vertical pleats, there are patch pockets on the upper sleeves with large velcro patches (earlier versions did not have the velcro patches), the sleeves have elbow pads. The bottom of the sleeves have adjustment tabs. The jacket can be worn tucked into or outside the trousers.
- the straight cut combat trousers have a one-piece waistband with seven belt loops and are closed by a button and a zipper. The trousers have two side slash pockets and there are large pleated patch pockets with flaps on the outside thighs. The pocket openings are angled for easier access. The back of the trousers have slash and flap pockets with flaps closed by a hidden button. The trousers have reinforcing pads in the knees while there is an extra layer of fabric in the seat.

Several variations of this pattern have been produced, they are as follows:

- Summer is a pixelated version of black, brown, and dark green pixels on a light green background.
- "Desert" is a desert version with beige, darkish beige and brown pixels on a sandy background.
- Sever is an arctic camo with light gray and dark gray pixels on a white background.
- "City" is an urban version of it.

Full-scale adoption began in 2011.

According to TsNIITochMash, the fabric used in EMR is waterproof, flame-proof, tear-resistant and breathable.

It is reported that EMR camouflage fabrics have been made in China due to it being cheap. Depending on the manufacturer, there may be other EMR pattern variants.

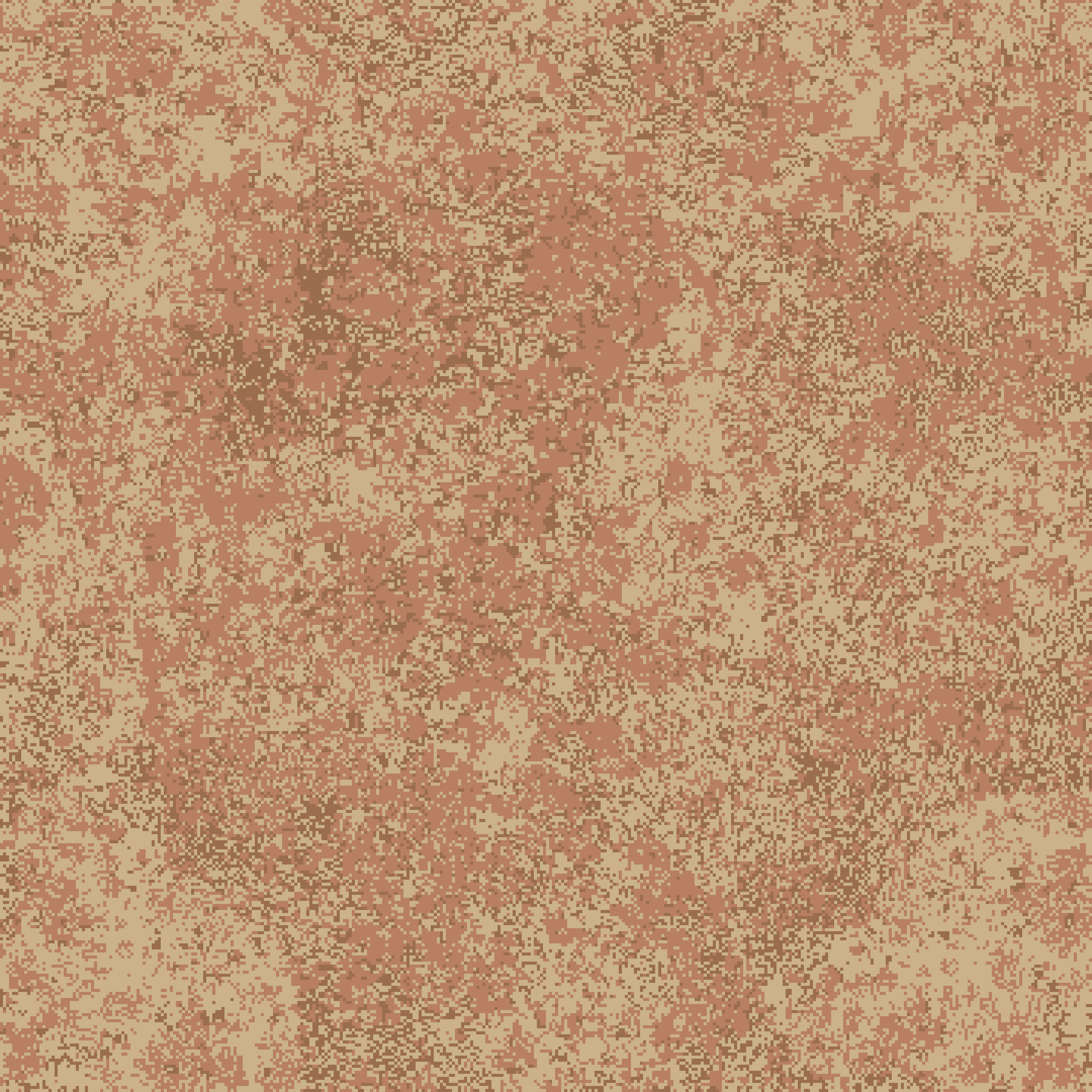
Desert variant of E.M.R. used by the Russian troops in Syria.

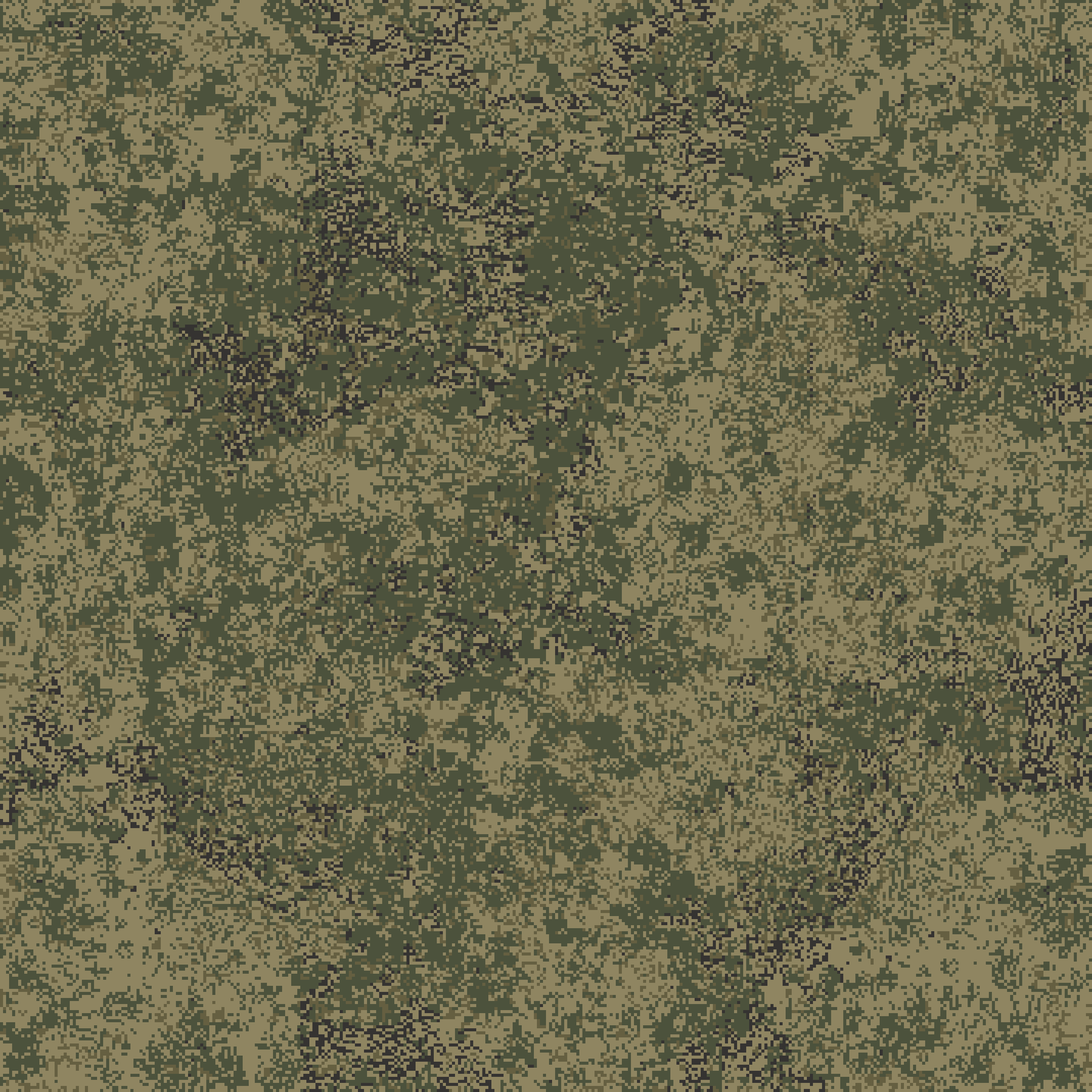
Belarusian variant used by the Armed Forces of Belarus, which uses different colours compared to the Russian E.M.R. camouflage.

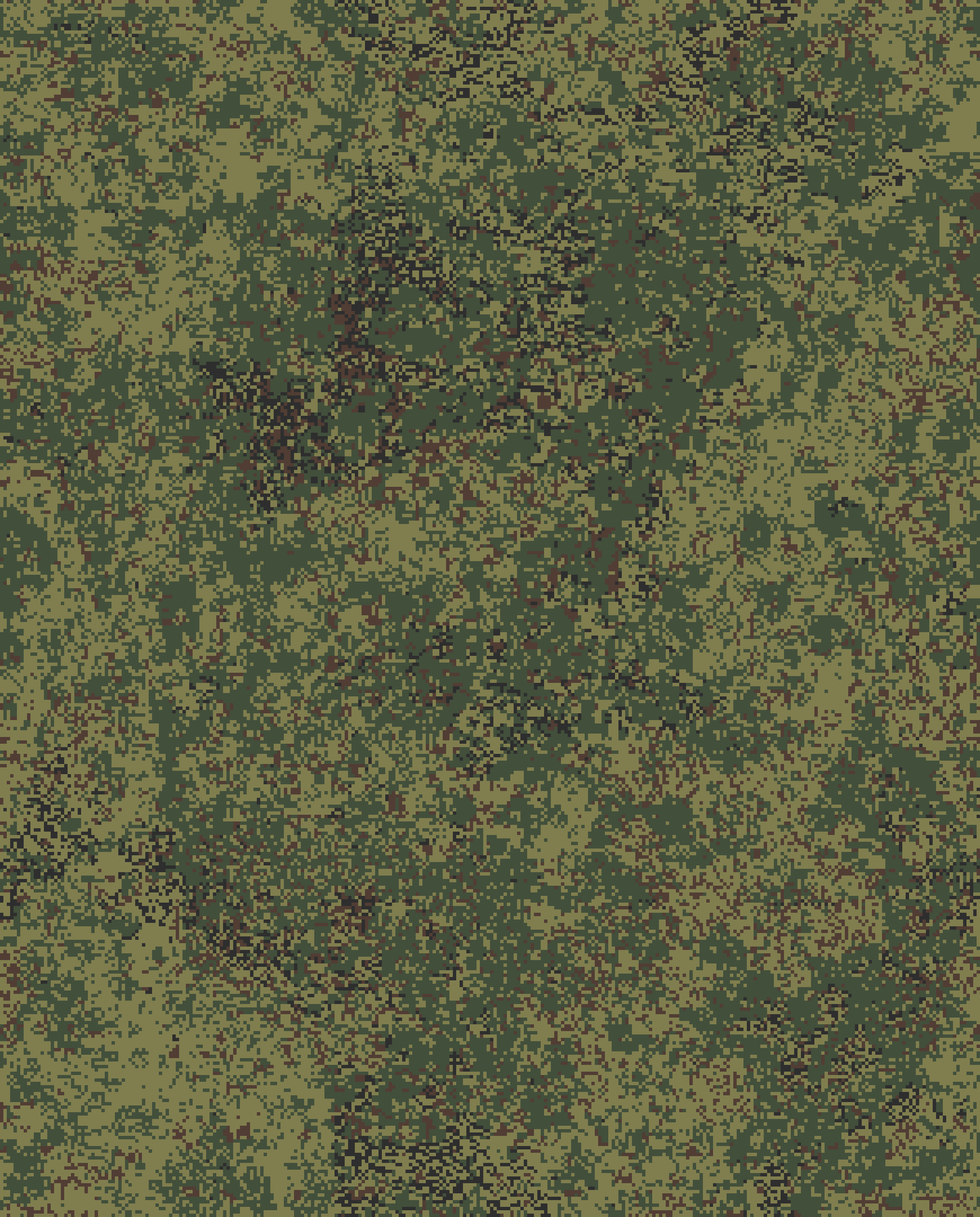
« Standard » summer pattern used predominantly by default in the Russian Armed Forces.

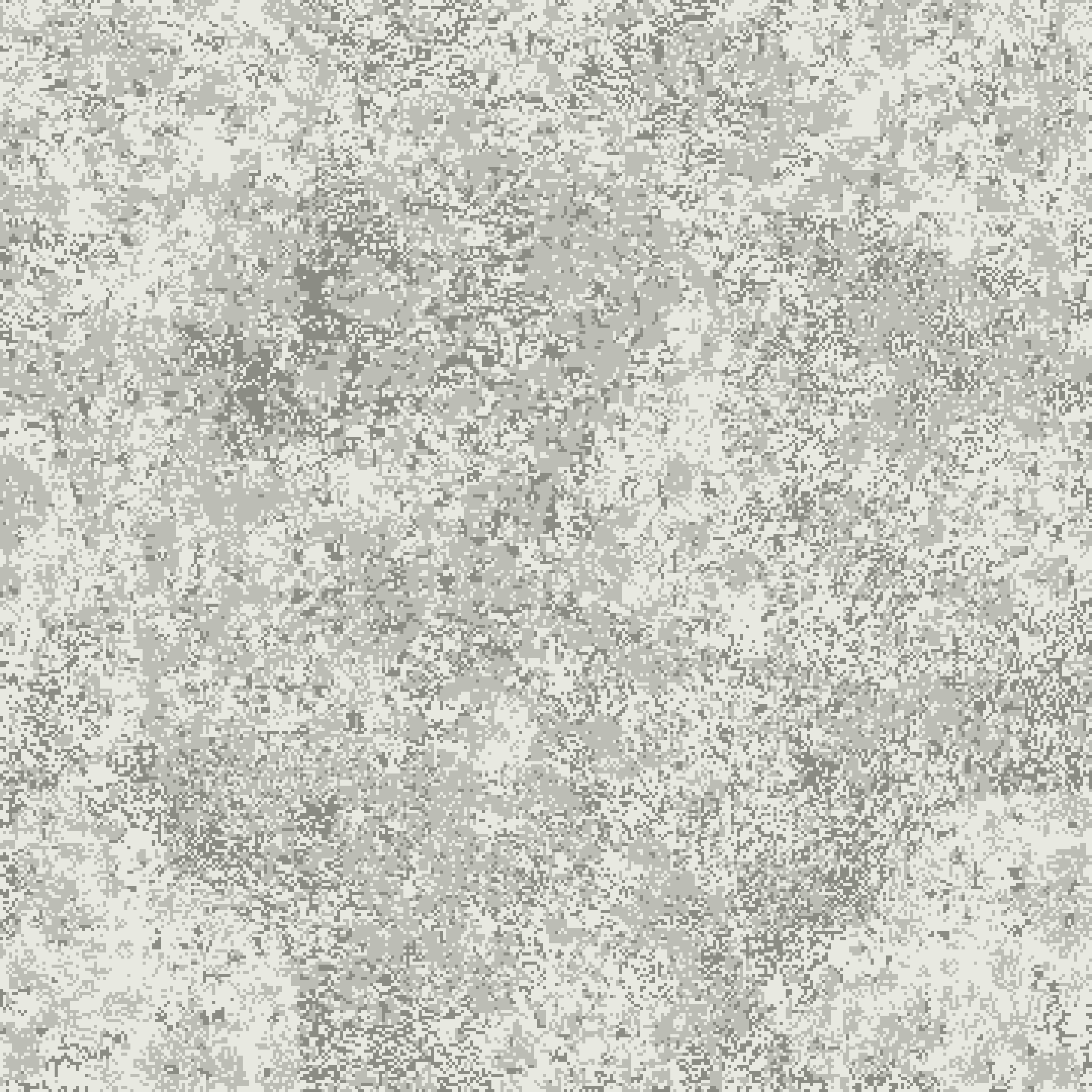
Arctic variant of E.M.R. camouflage used by the Russian troops of the Leningrad Military District in its arctic/snowy territories.

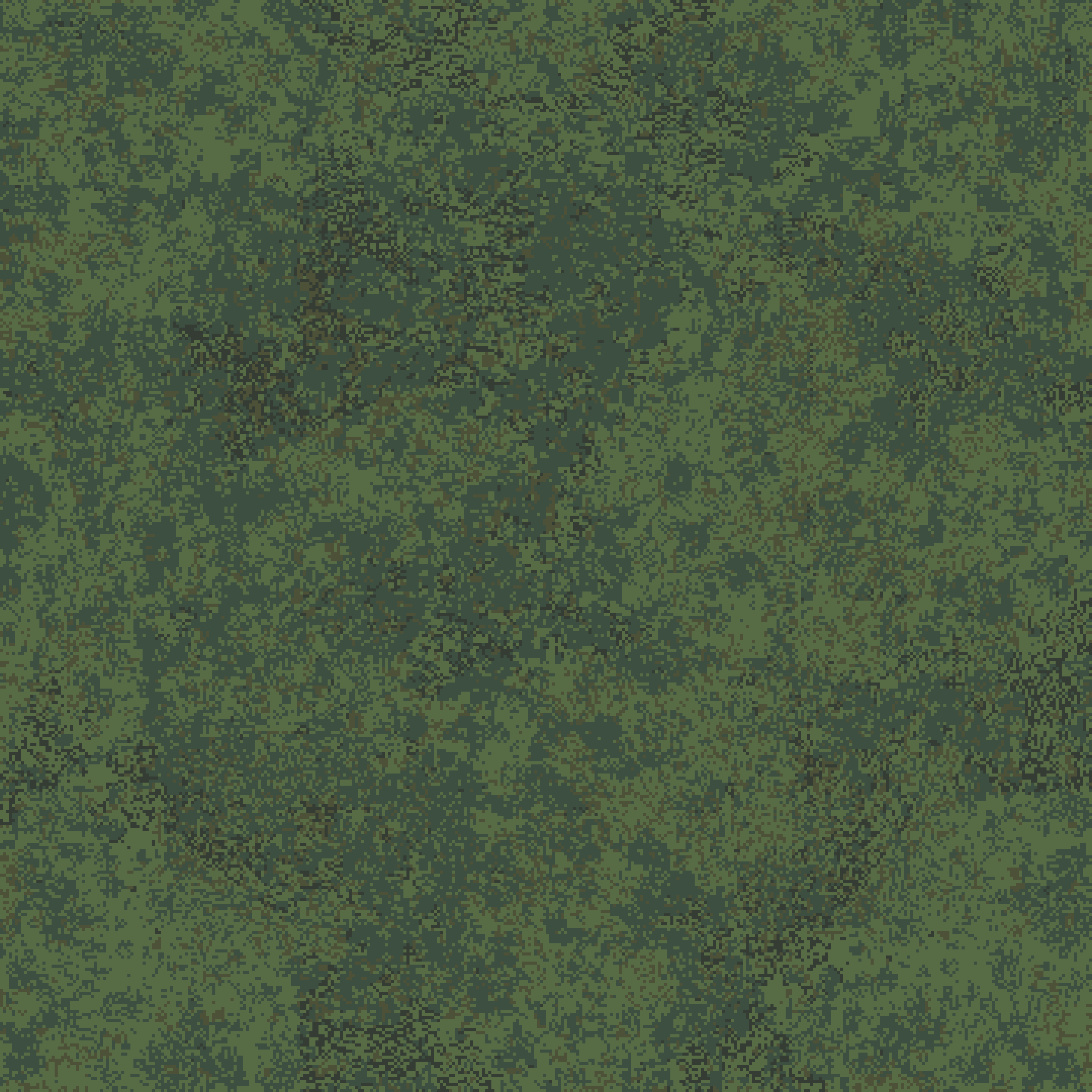
"Green men" old and first version of E.M.R. camouflage pattern used for the first time during the Russian annexation of Crimea by the Russian Armed Forces.

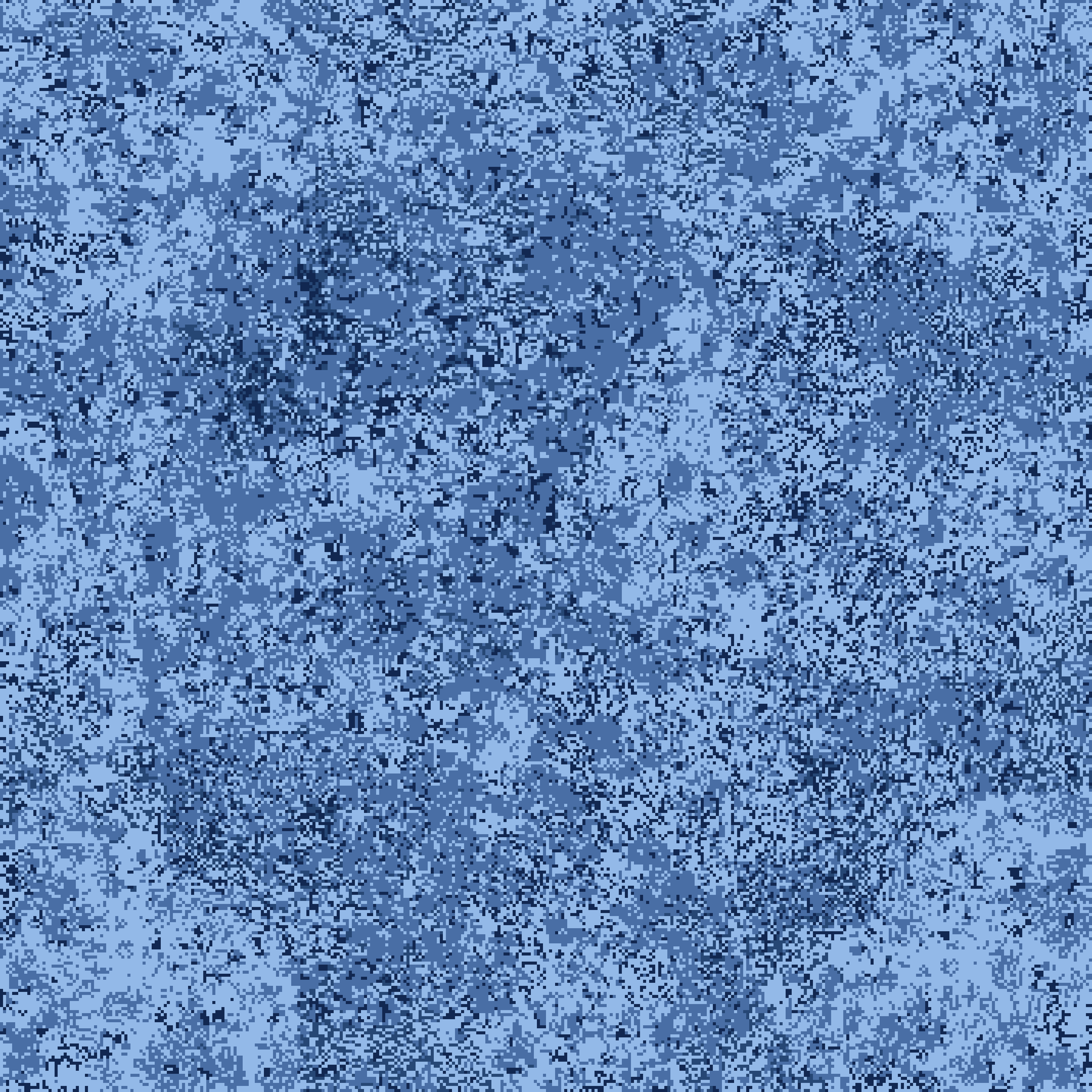
Urban E.M.R. camouflage used by the troops of the Russian Ministry of Internal Affairs.

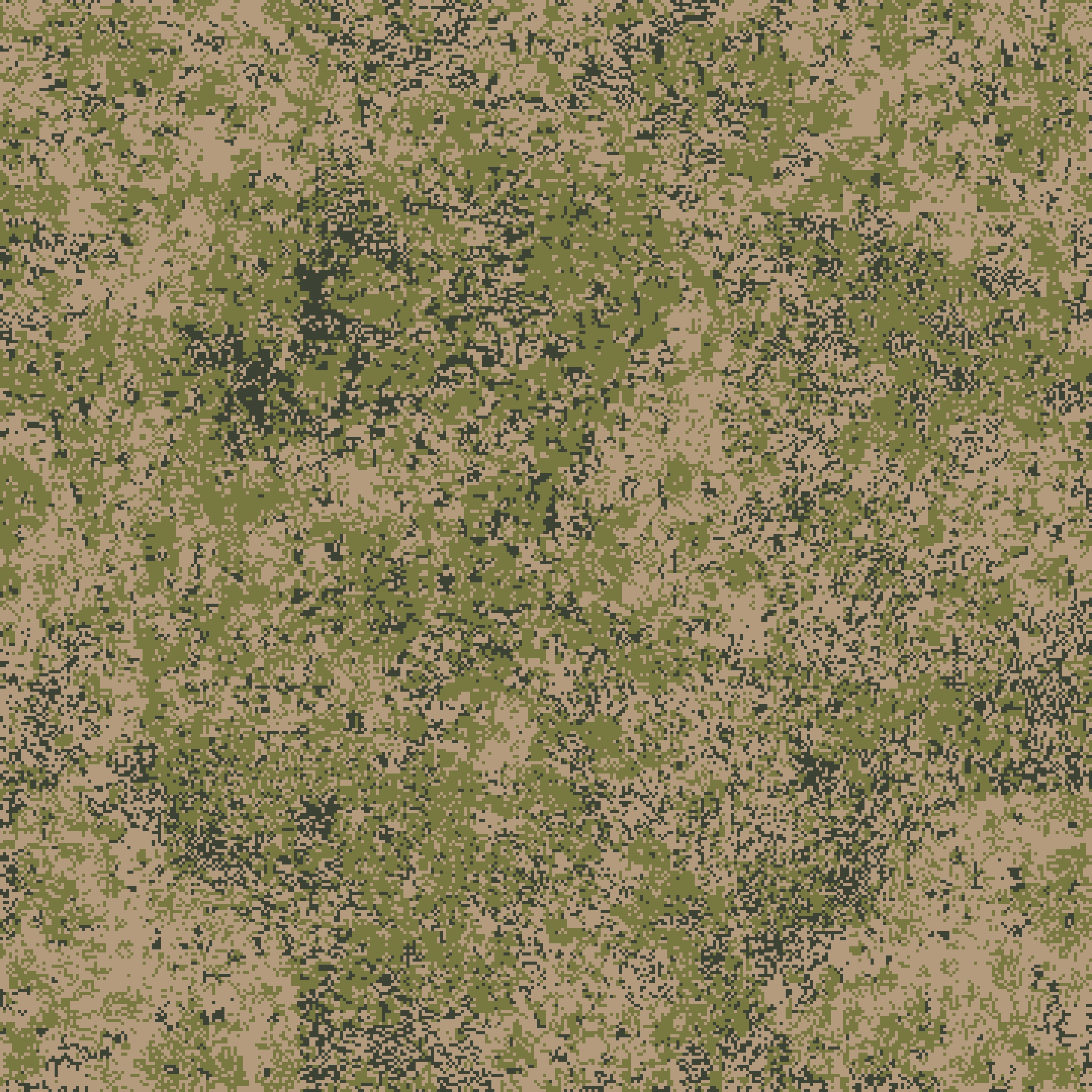
Spring variant of the E.M.R. camouflage used on the obverse side of the 6sh122 oversuit by the Russian Armed Forces.

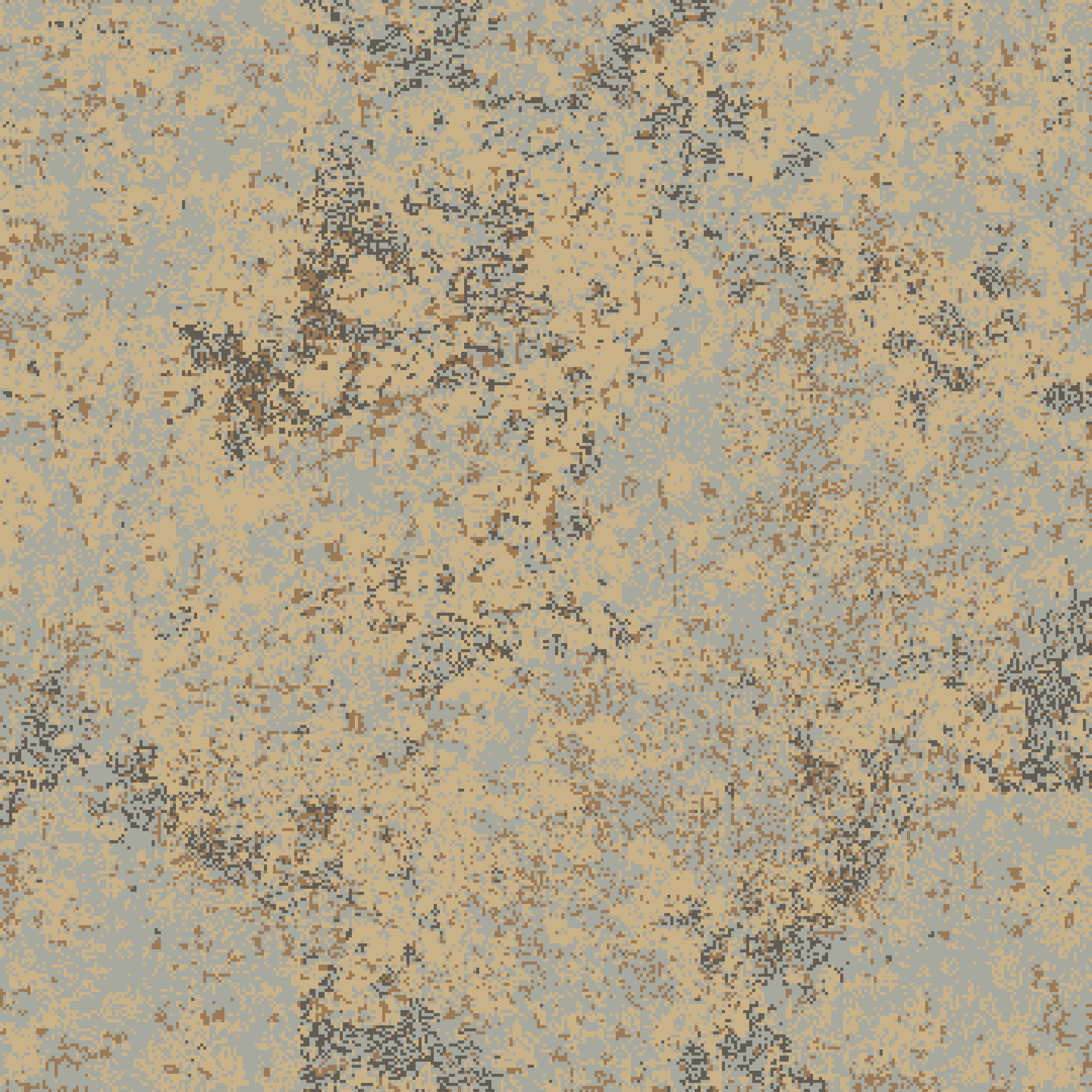
Autumn variant of the E.M.R. camouflage pattern used on the back side of the 6Sh122 oversuit by the Russian Armed Forces.

== Users ==
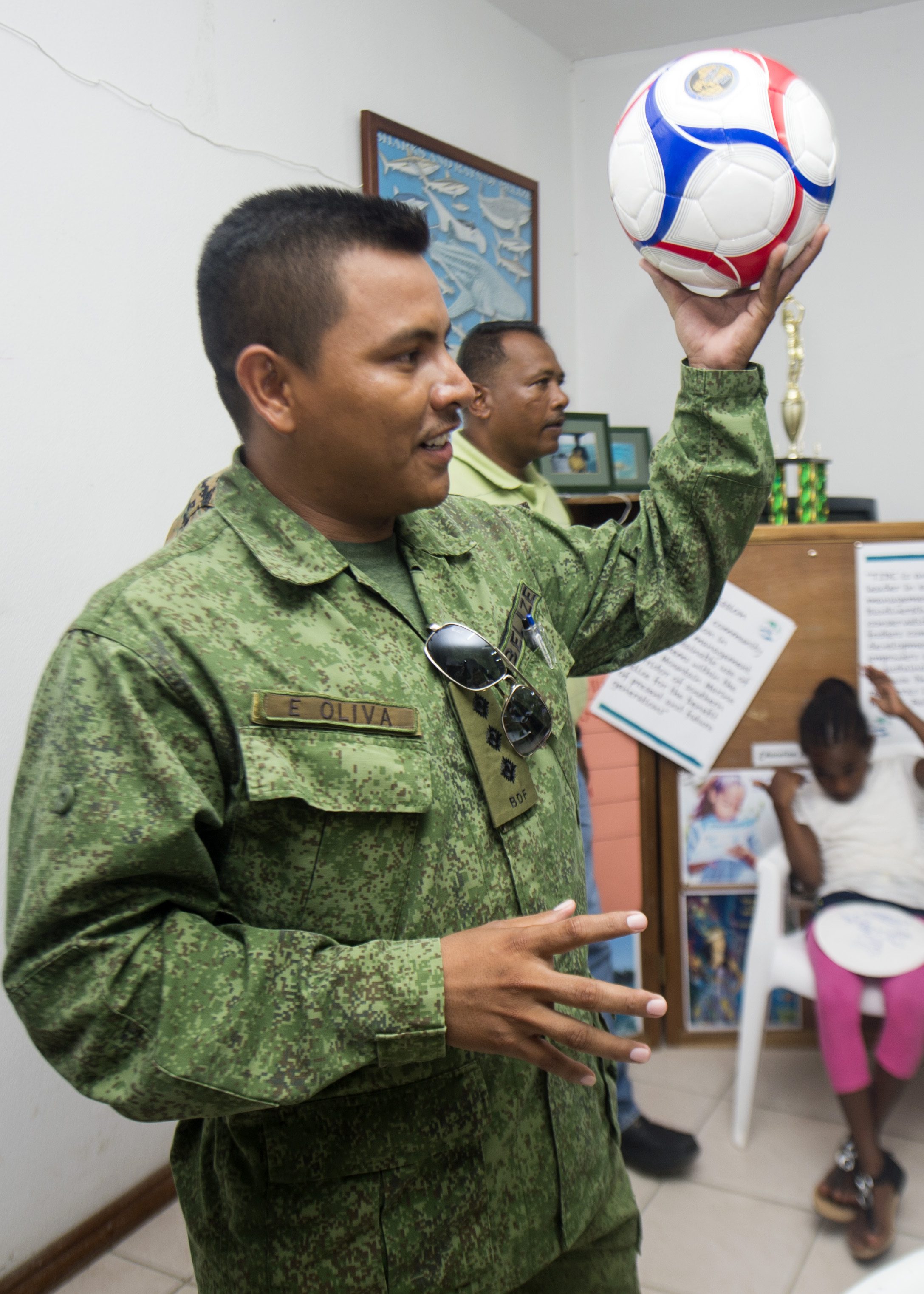
Belize Defense Force officer wearing an EMR clone.

- Belarus: Armed Forces of Belarus, with slightly different color scheme. They were first seen with paratroopers from the 38th Airmobile Brigade.
- Belize: EMR clones adopted by Belize Defense Force in October 2011 to replace their non-digital camouflage uniforms.
- Russia: Adopted by the Russian Armed Forces to replace Flora camouflage uniforms.
  - Donetsk People's Republic
  - Luhansk People's Republic
- North Korea: Issued to North Korean units deployed in the Russo-Ukrainian war.
- Tajikistan: Used by the Tajik Army.

=== Partially-recognized states ===
- Abkhazia
- South Ossetia
- Transnistria

=== Non-state actors ===
- People's Defence Force

=== Former ===
- Syria: Used by Republican Guard and special forces.

== Gallery ==
=== Russia ===
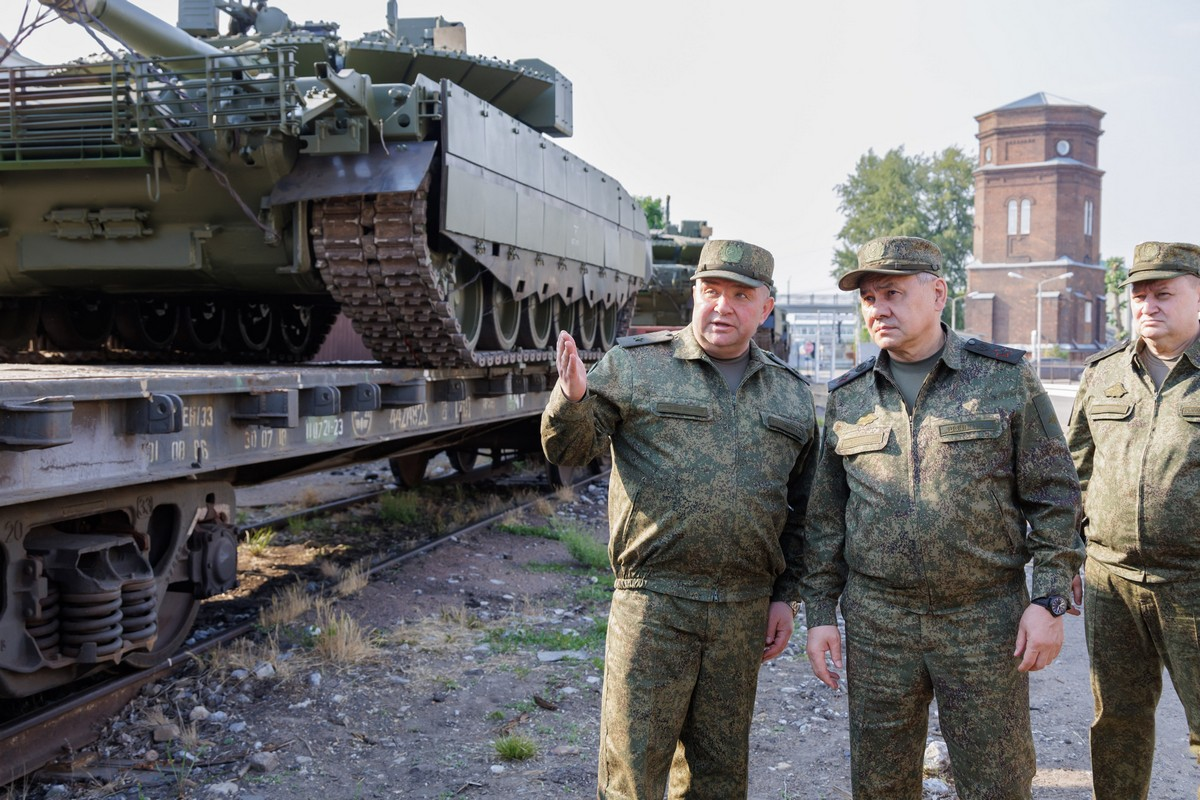
Sergei Shoigu (In the middle), who served as Minister of Defence until 2024, wearing an office uniform in EMR

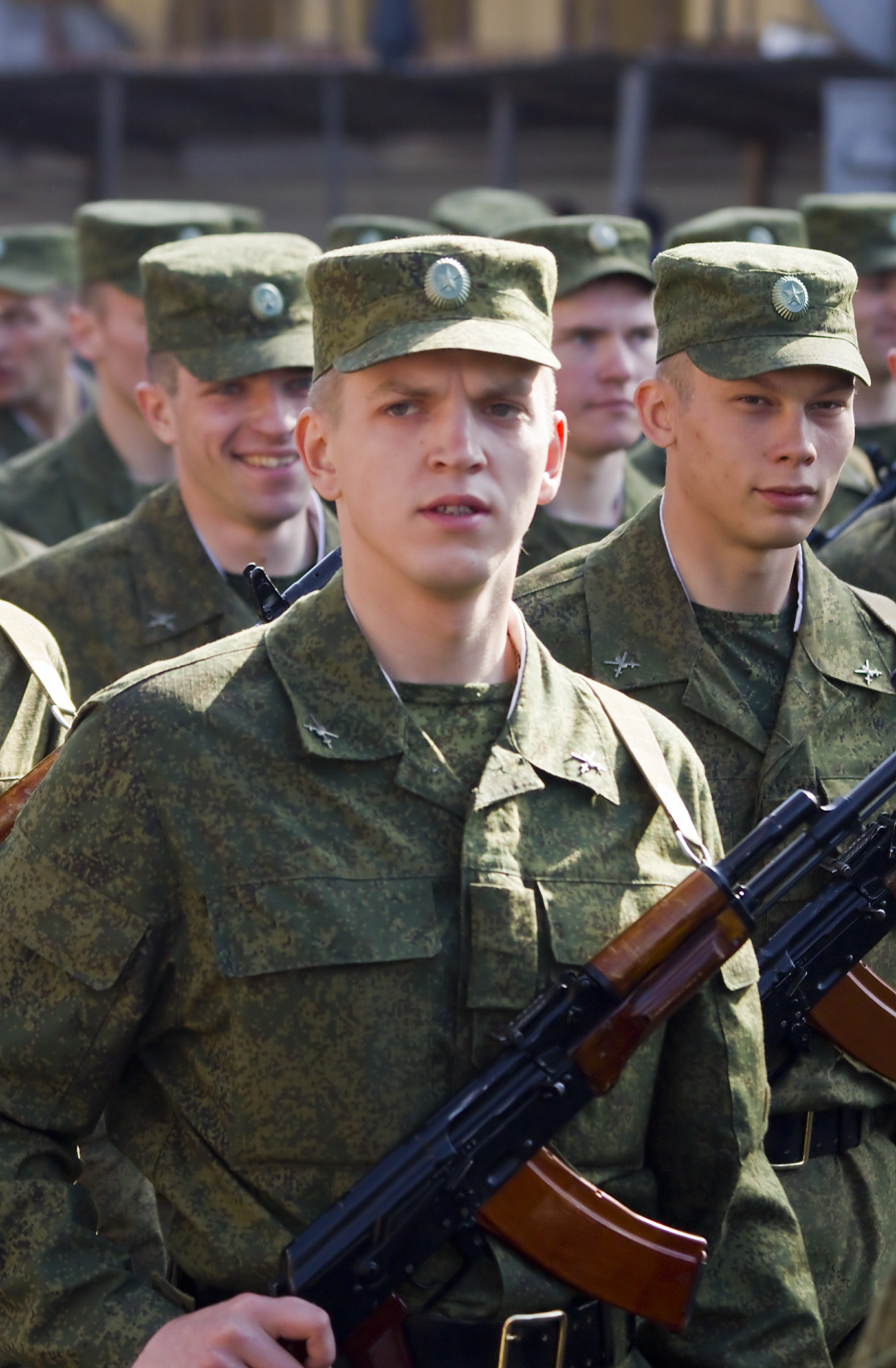
Russian soldiers wearing the first pattern EMR

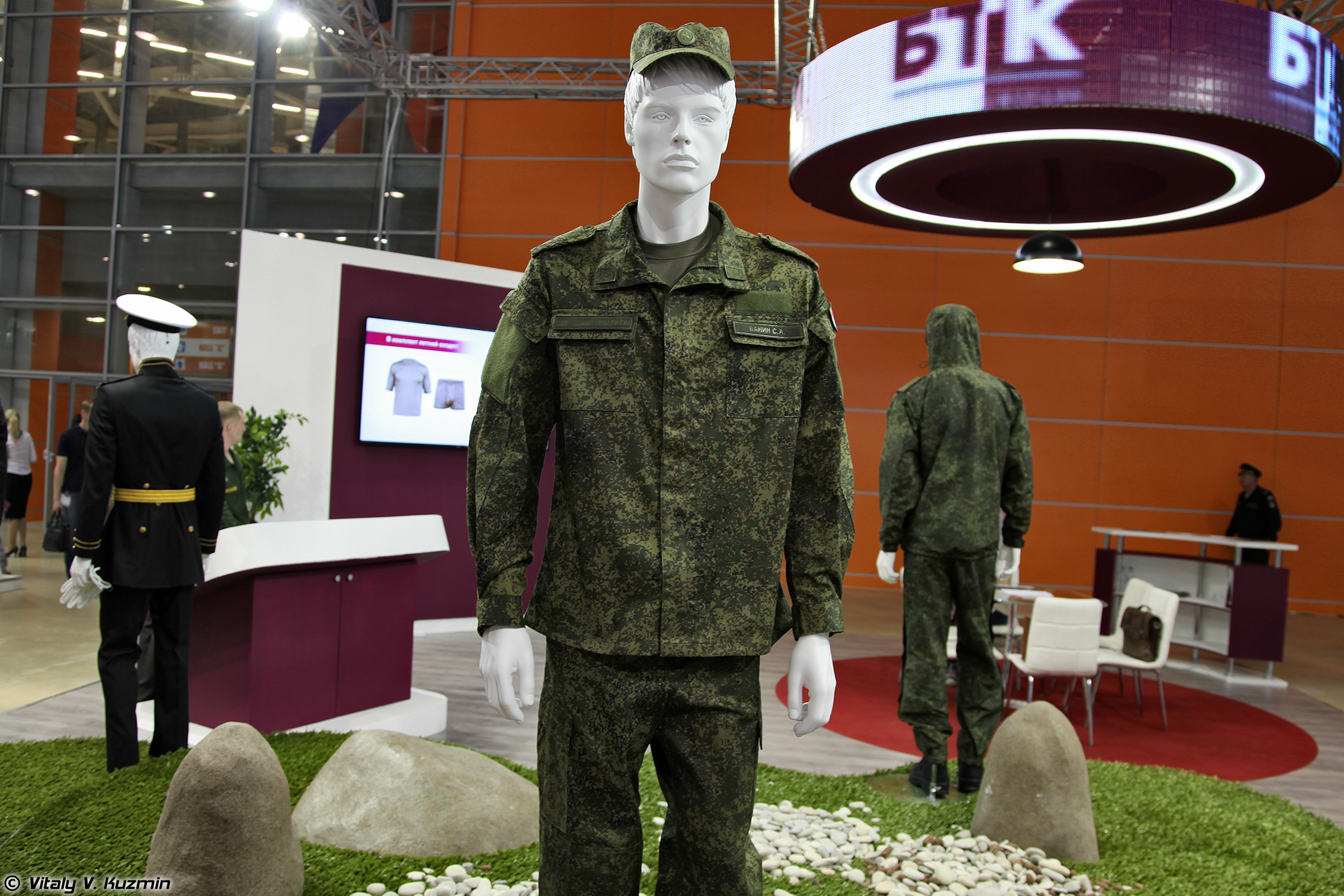
Display of the second EMR combat uniform

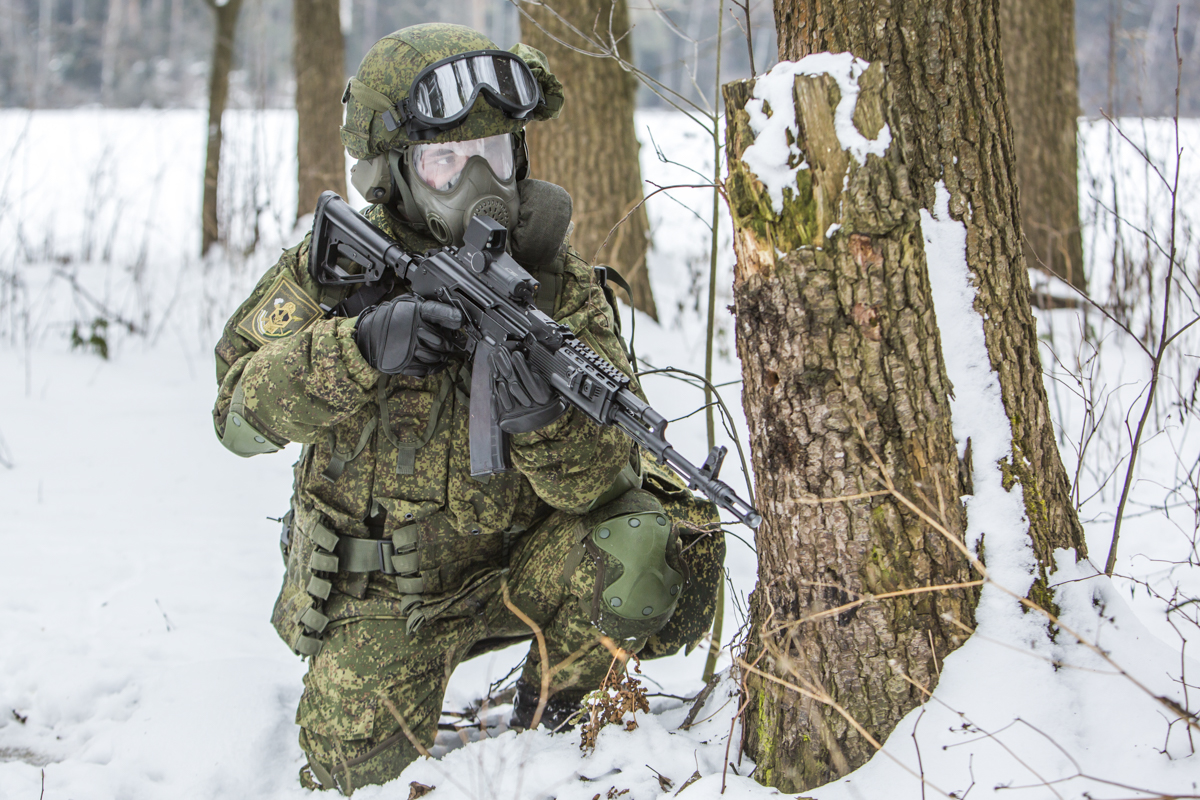
Russian soldier training in their Ratnik combat gear, an AK-74M rifle and PMK-4 gas mask

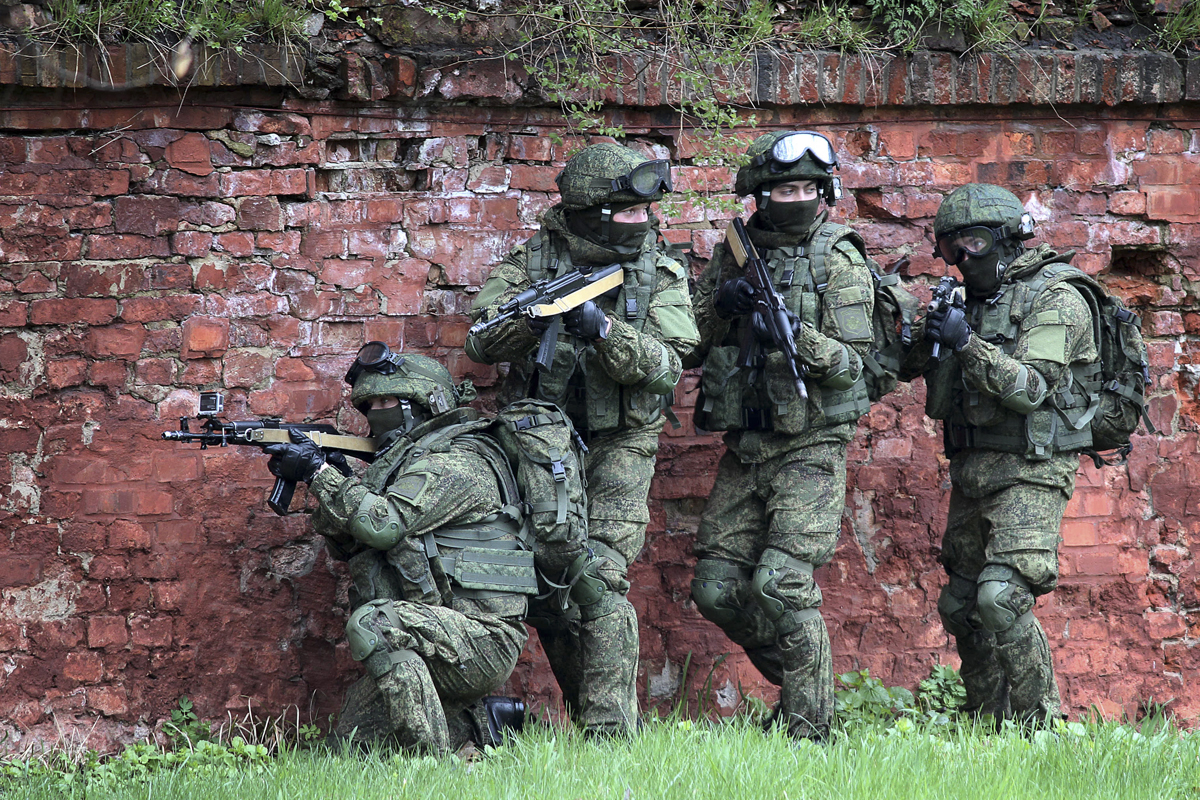
Russian commando frogmen conducting training exercises

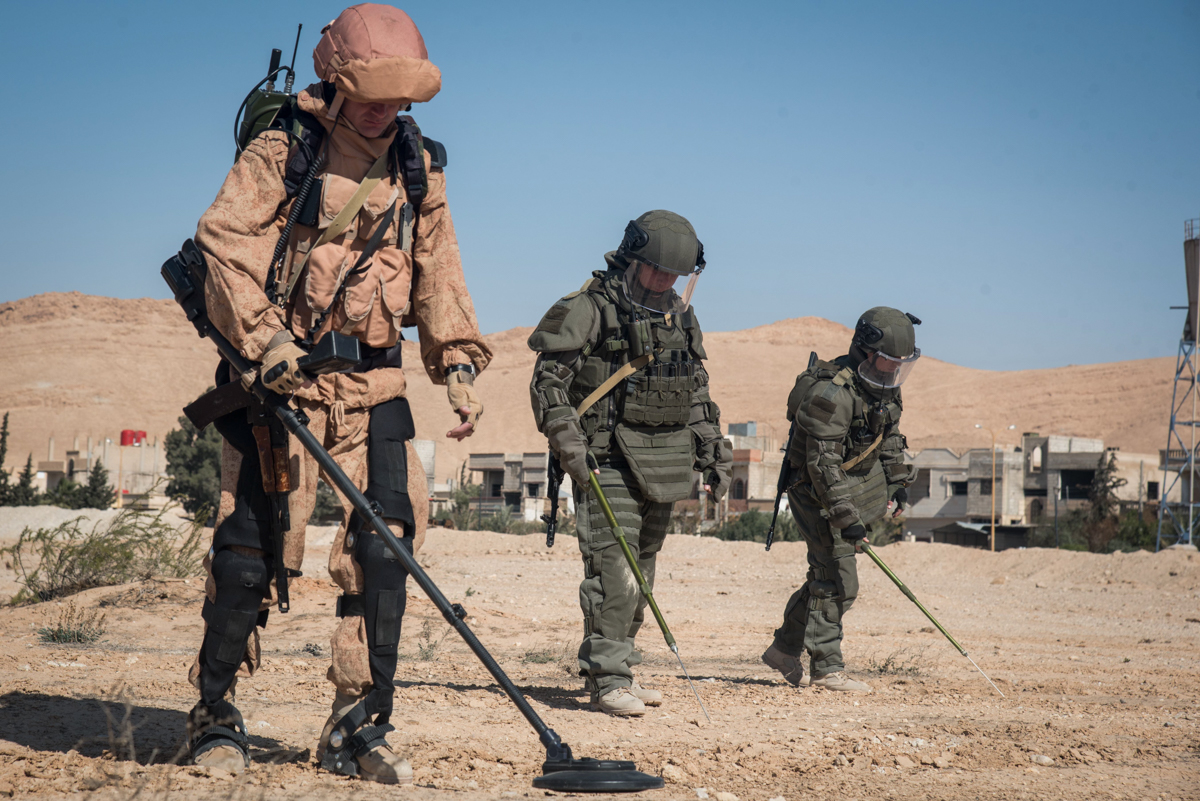
Russian sappers in Palmyra, Syria. Soldier on the left is wearing the desert variant of EMR camouflage

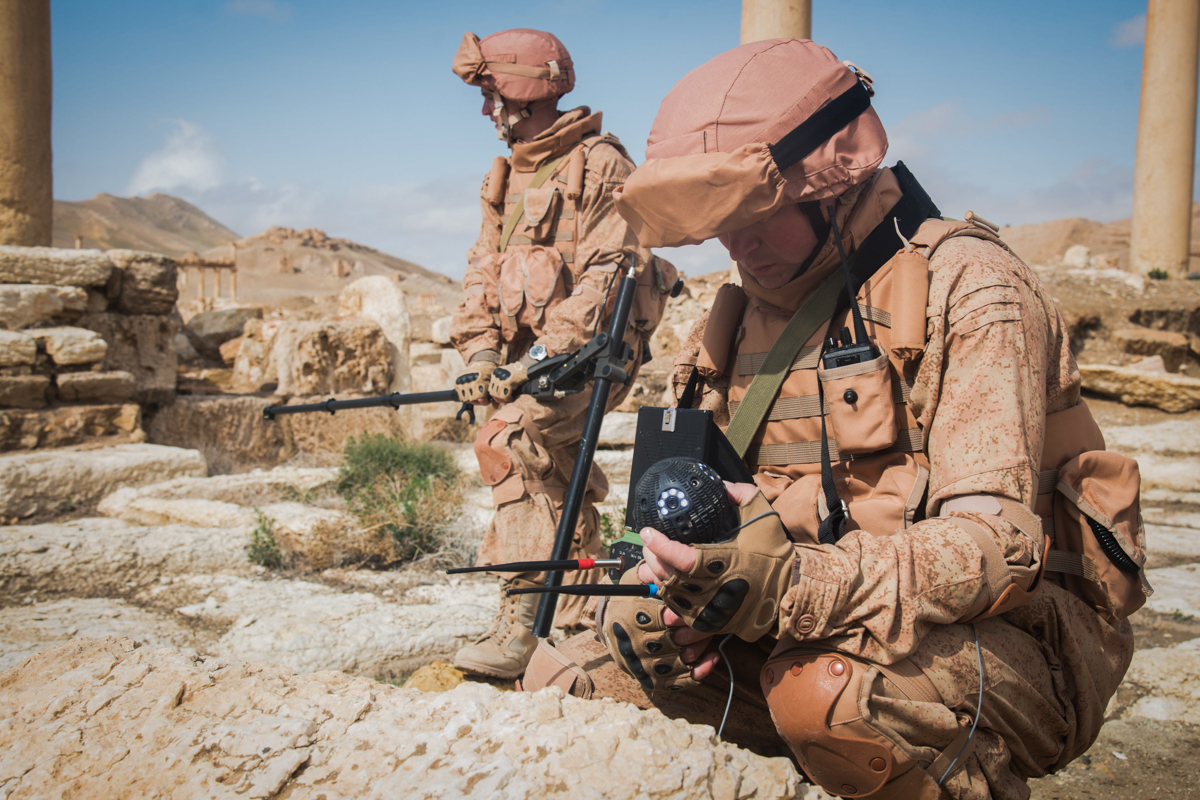
Close view of desert EMR

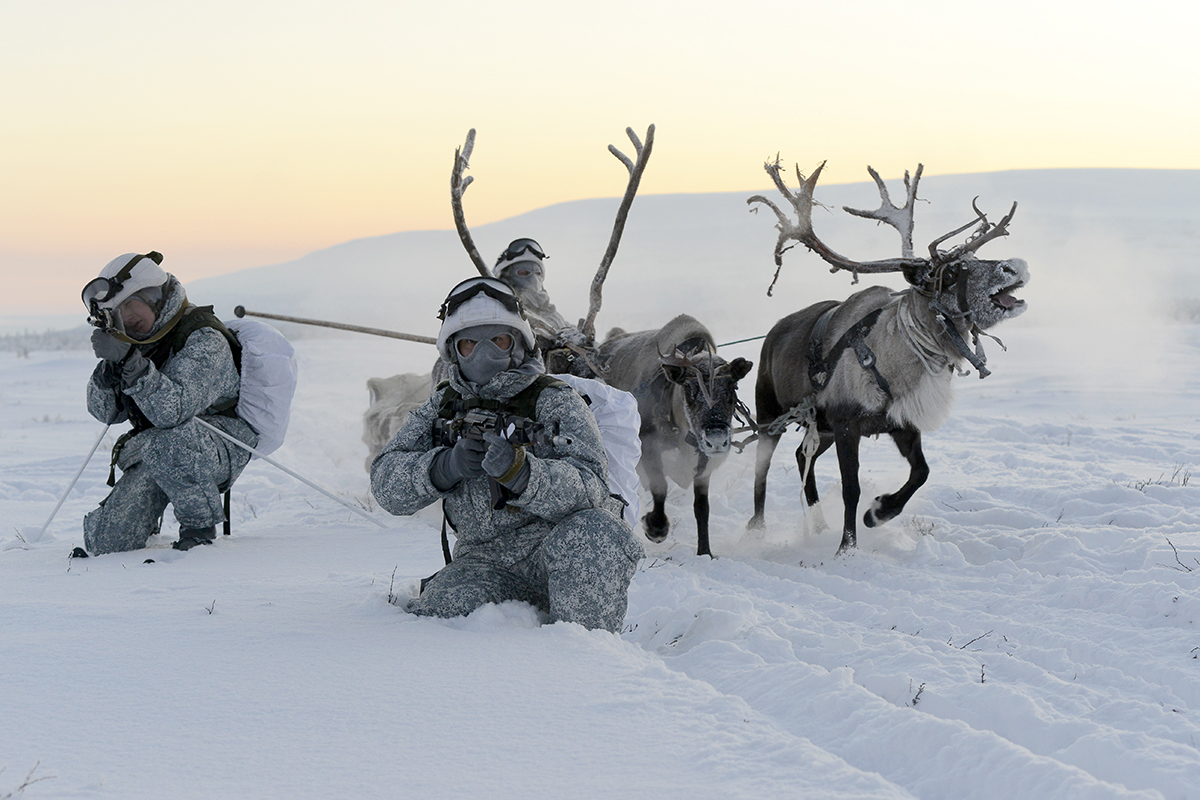
Soldiers of the 80th Arctic Motor Rifle Brigade wearing the Arctic pattern EMR

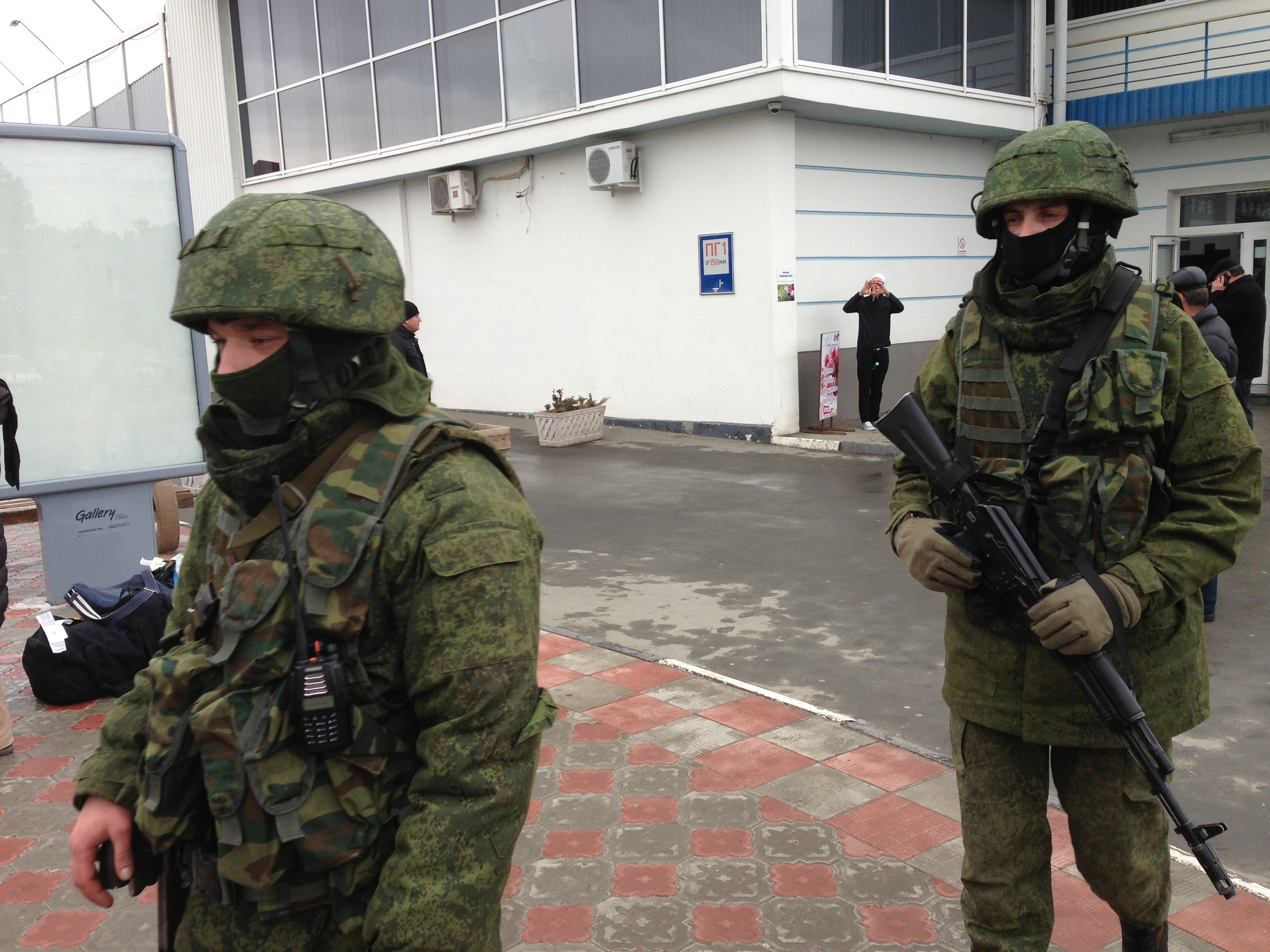
Little Green Men at the Crimean Crisis of 2014

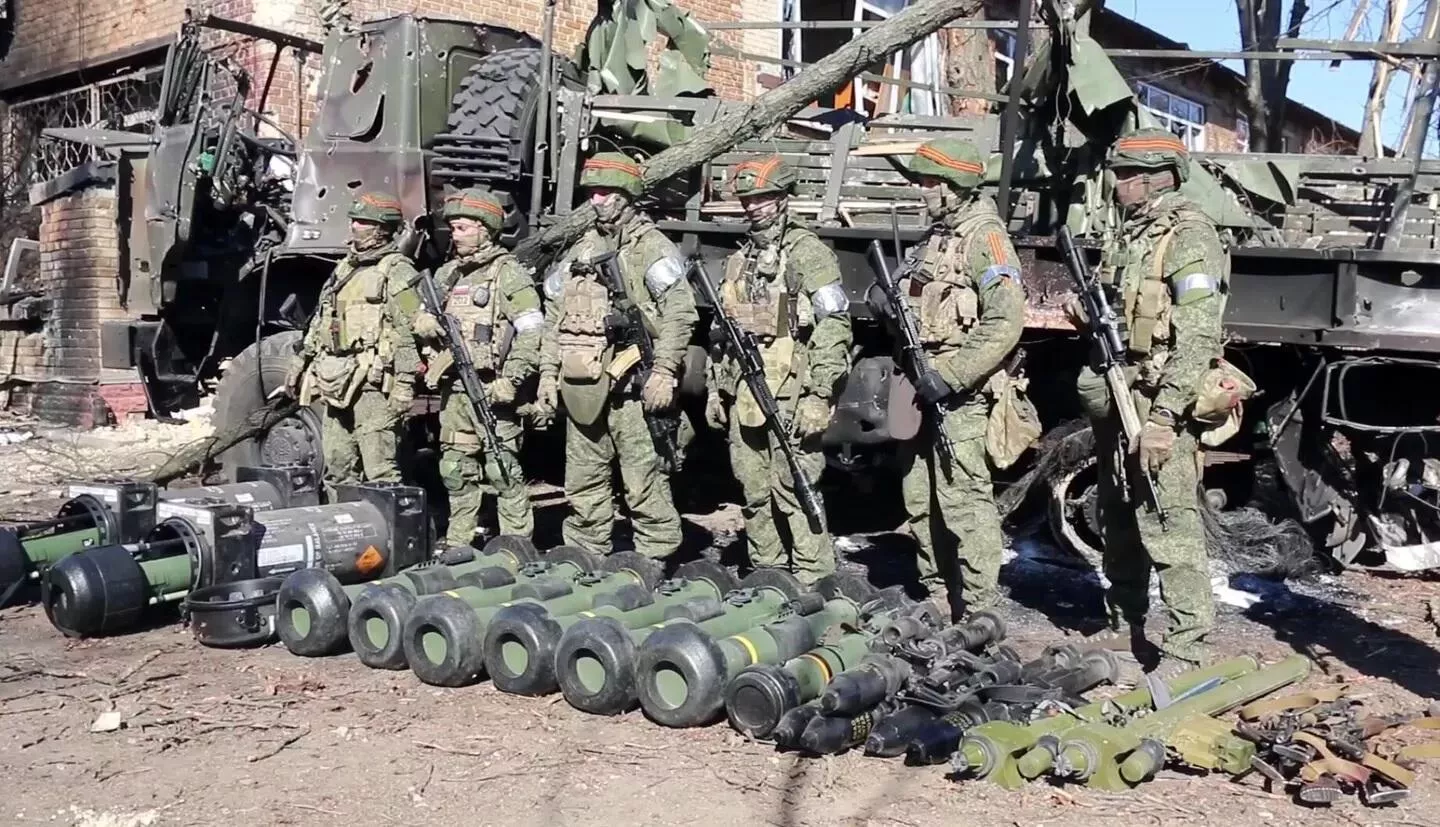
Russian soldiers wearing EMR posing with captured weapons, 2023

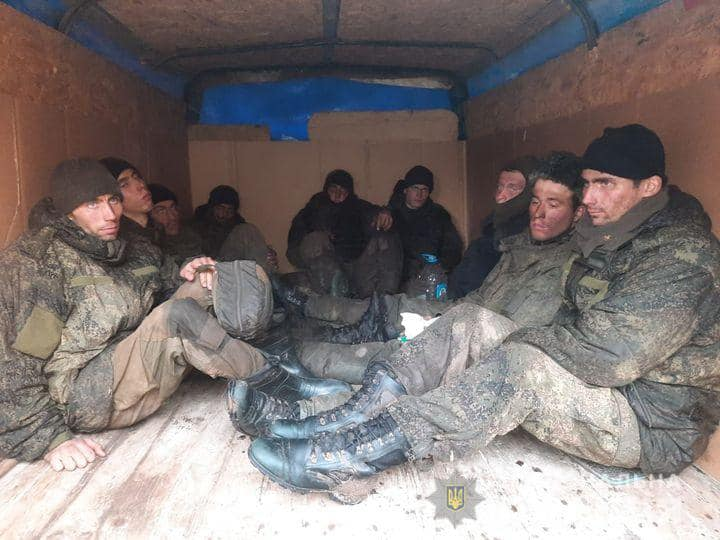
Russian prisoners of war at the Battle of Sumy in 2022 wearing EMR uniforms

=== Belarus ===
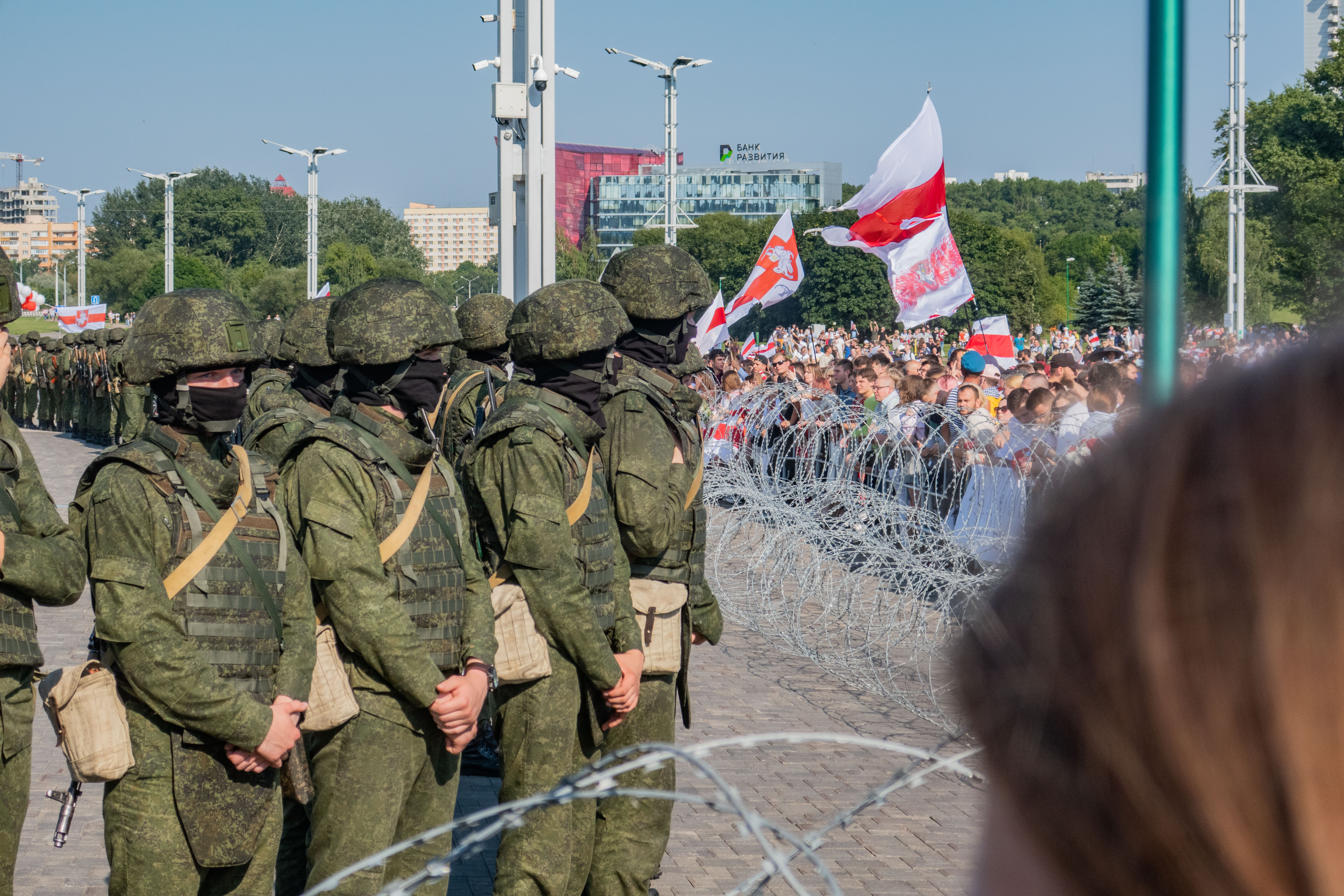
Belarusian soldiers with EMR uniforms during the 2020 Belarusian protests

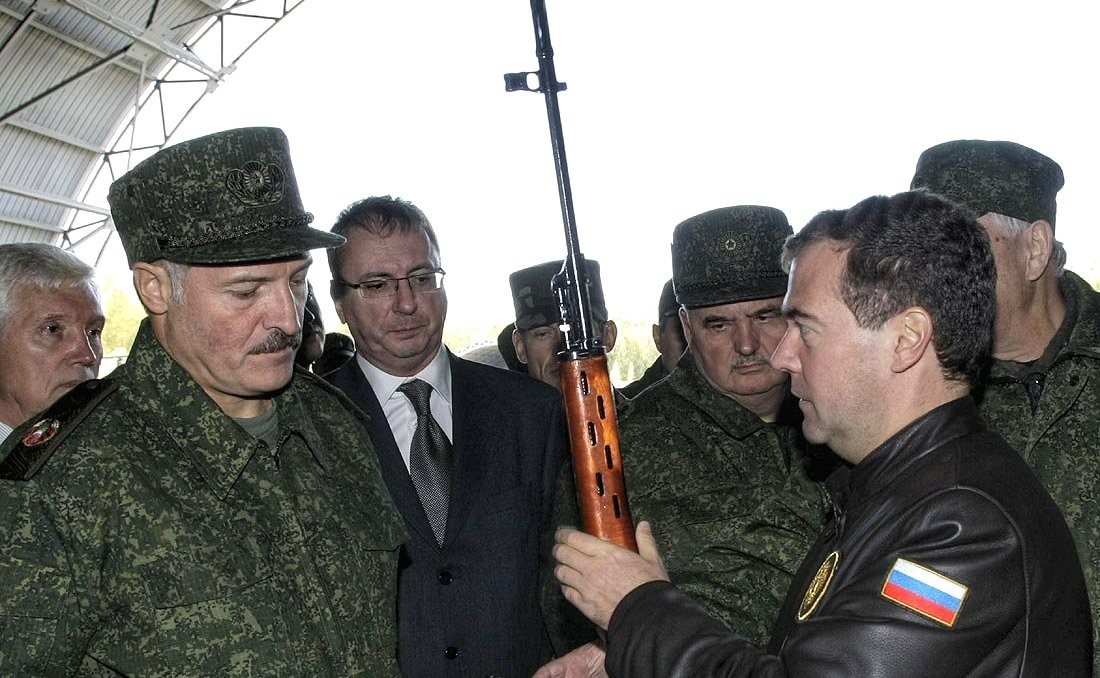
President of Belarus Alexander Lukashenko wearing an EMR uniform in a meeting with President of Russia Dmitry Medvedev in 2009

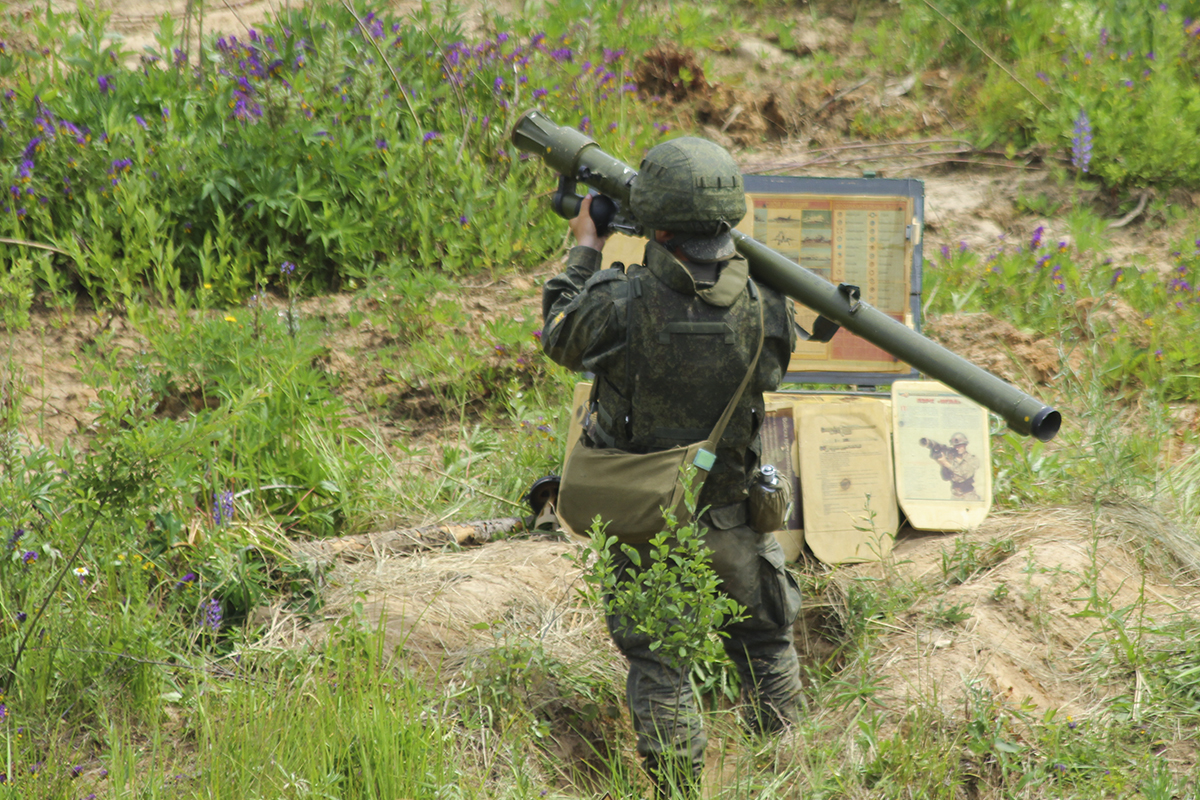
Belarusian soldier in a joint military exercise with Russia in 2018

=== Belize ===
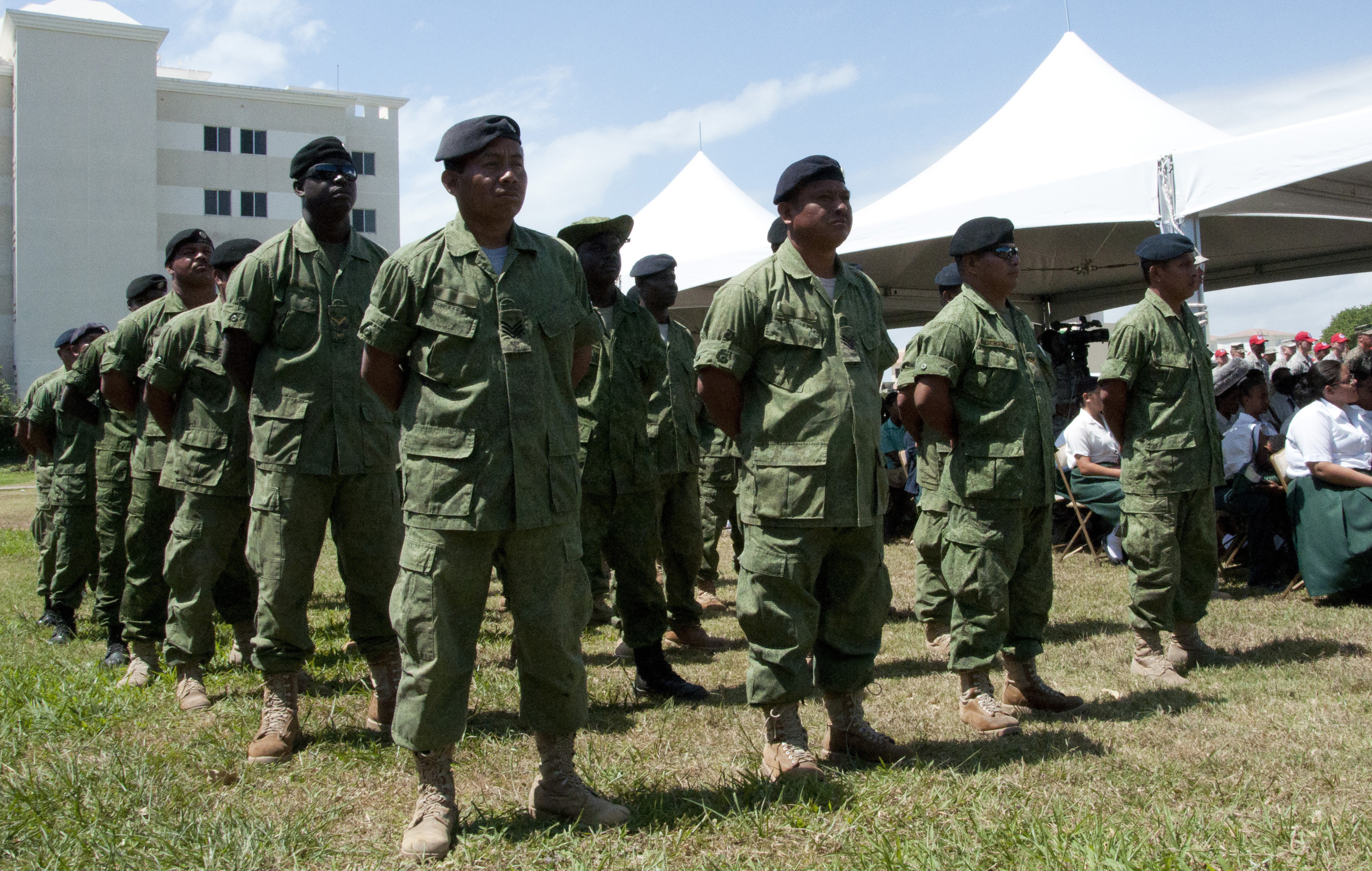
Belize Defence Force soldiers in a ceremony

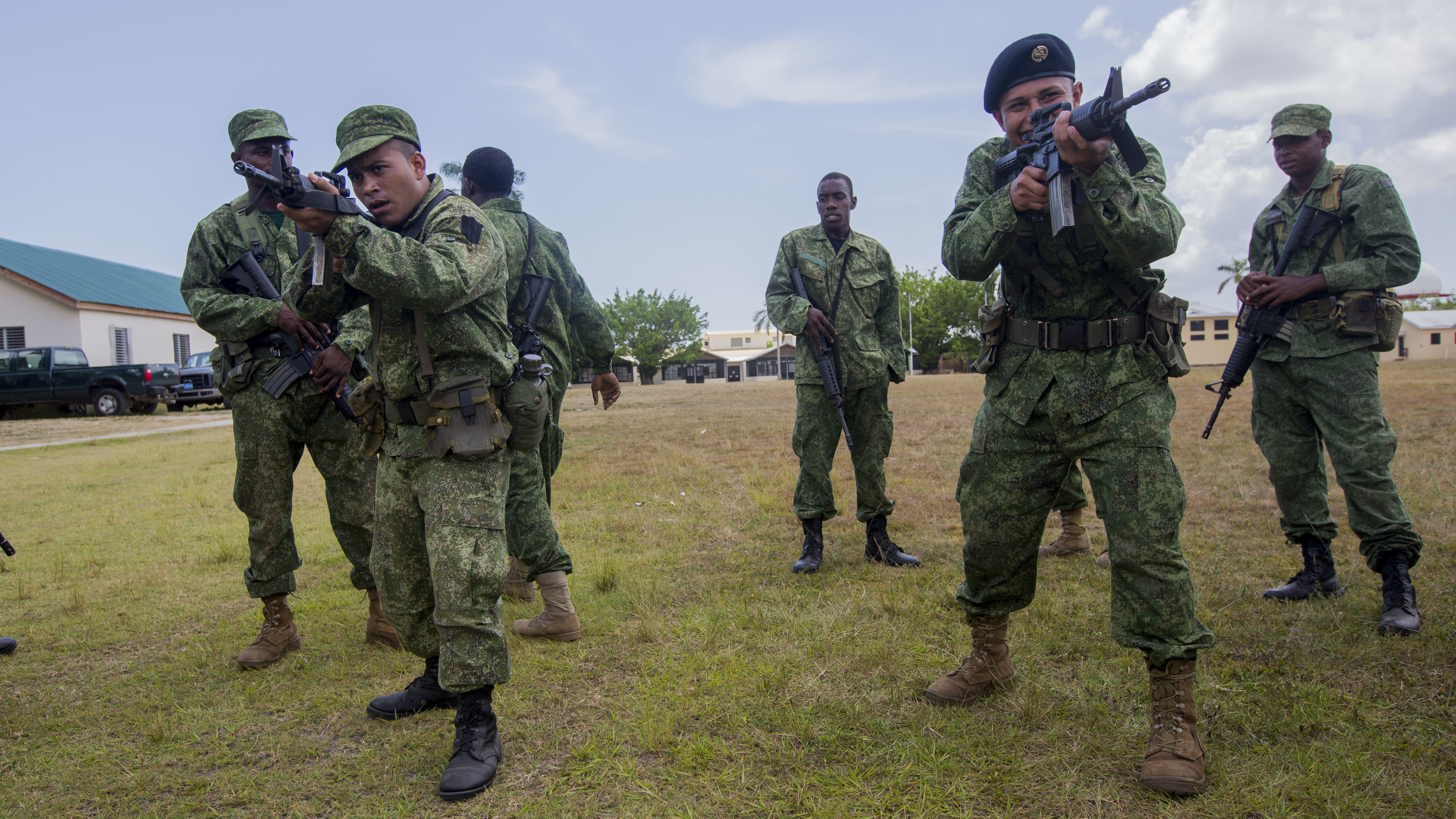
Belizean soldiers in marksmanship training

=== Tajikistan ===
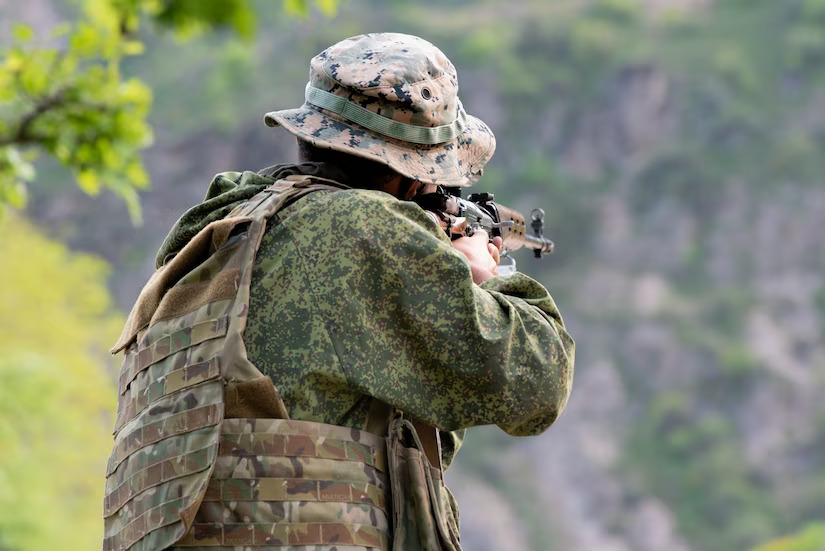
Tajik Soldier with SVD wearing an EMR uniform

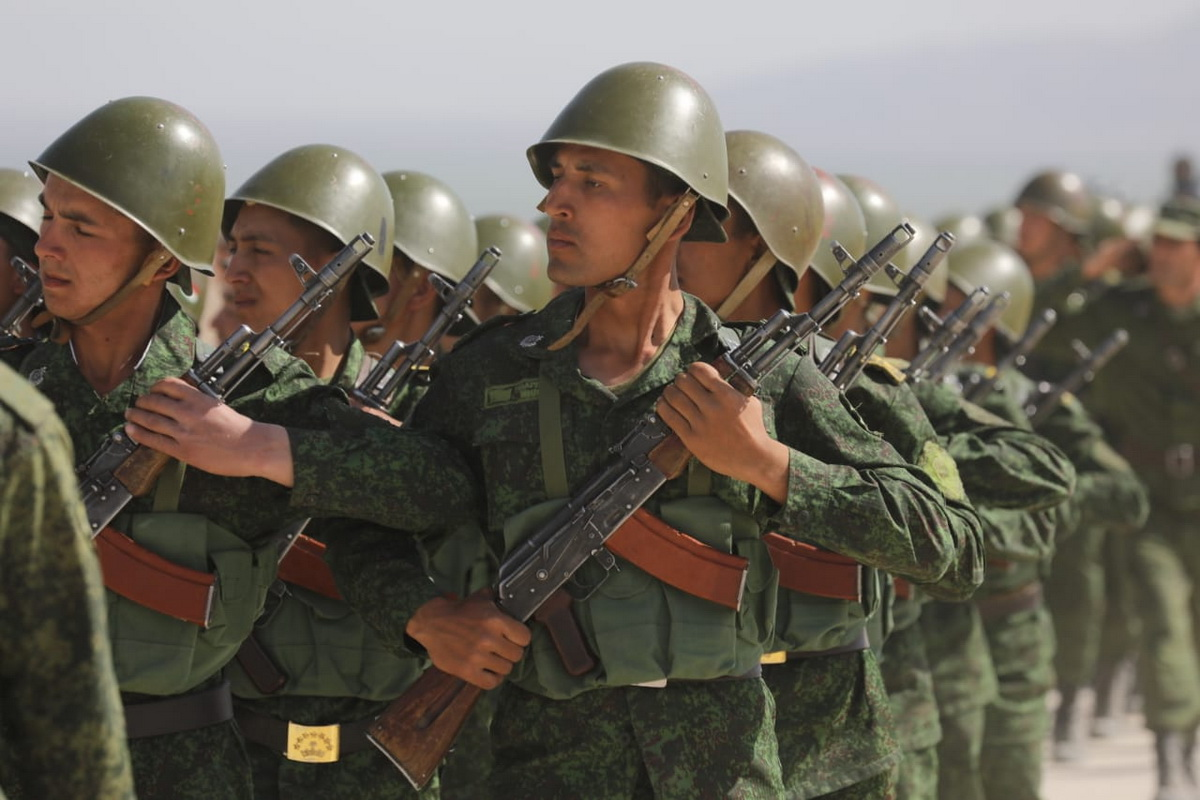
Tajik soldiers with EMR uniforms and old Soviet-era SSh-68 helmets

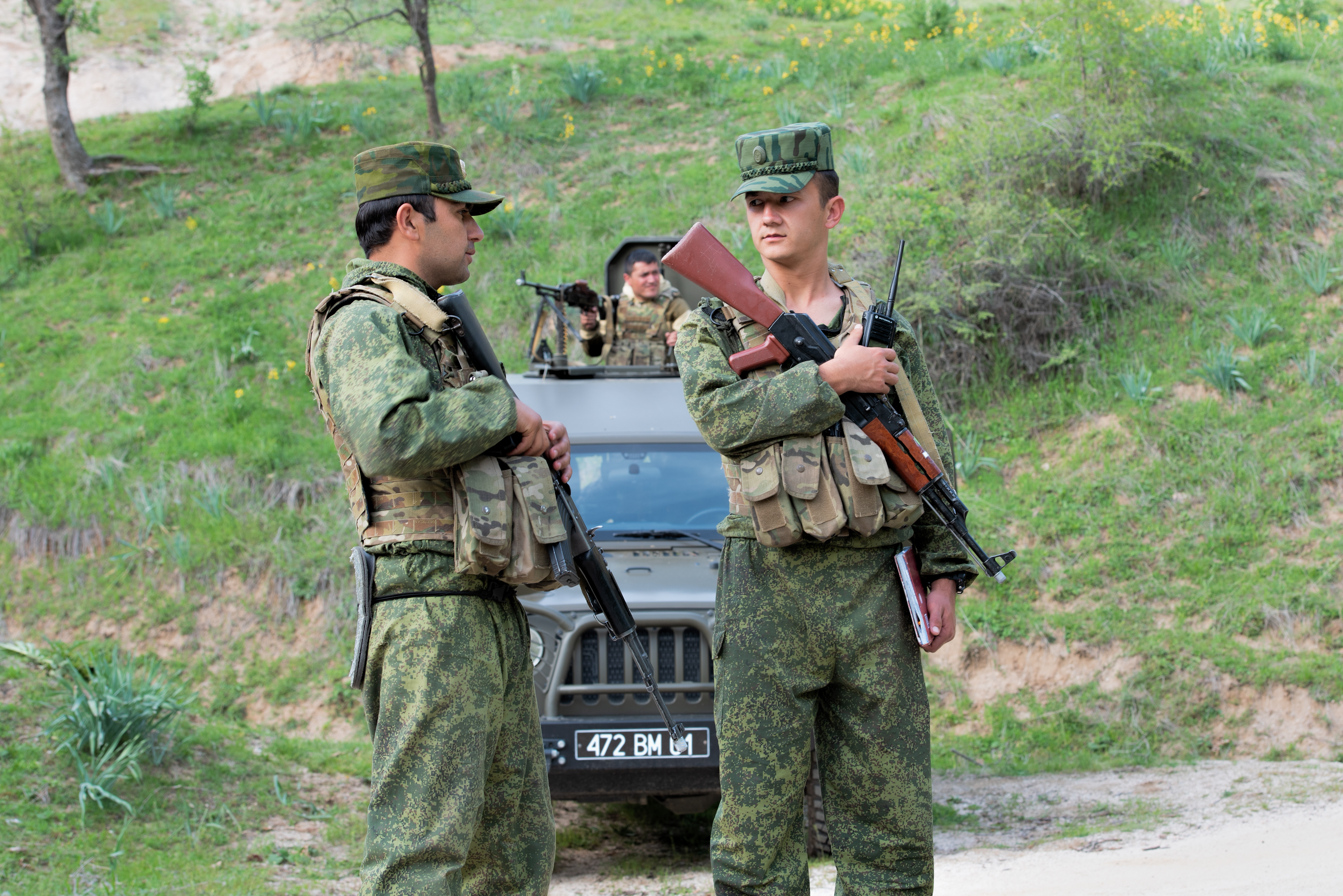
Two Tajik soldiers with EMR uniforms

=== Donbas ===
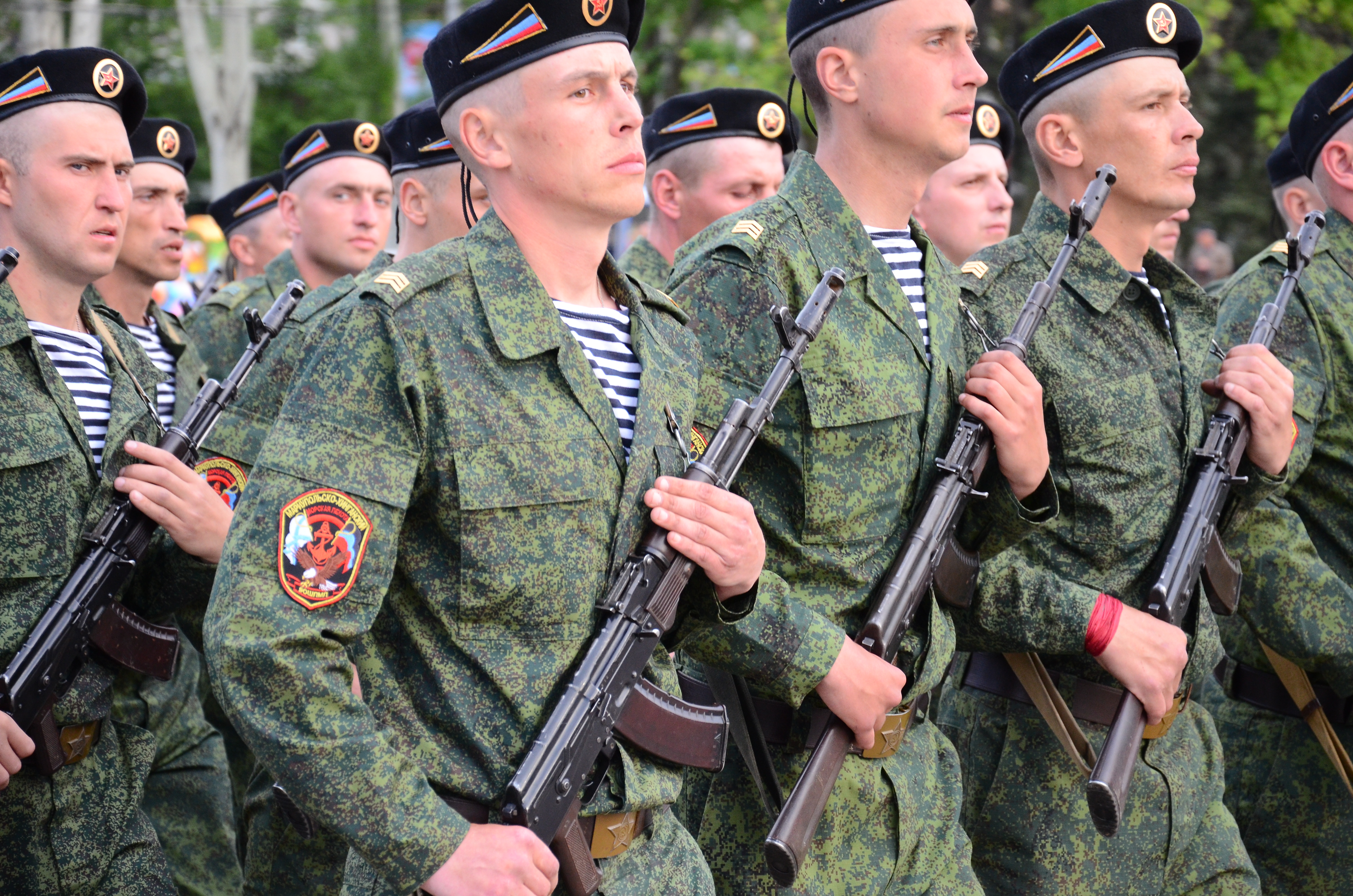
Marines of the Mariupol-Khingan Naval Infantry of the DPR People's Militia with EMR uniforms, wearing iconic telnyashkas thereunder.

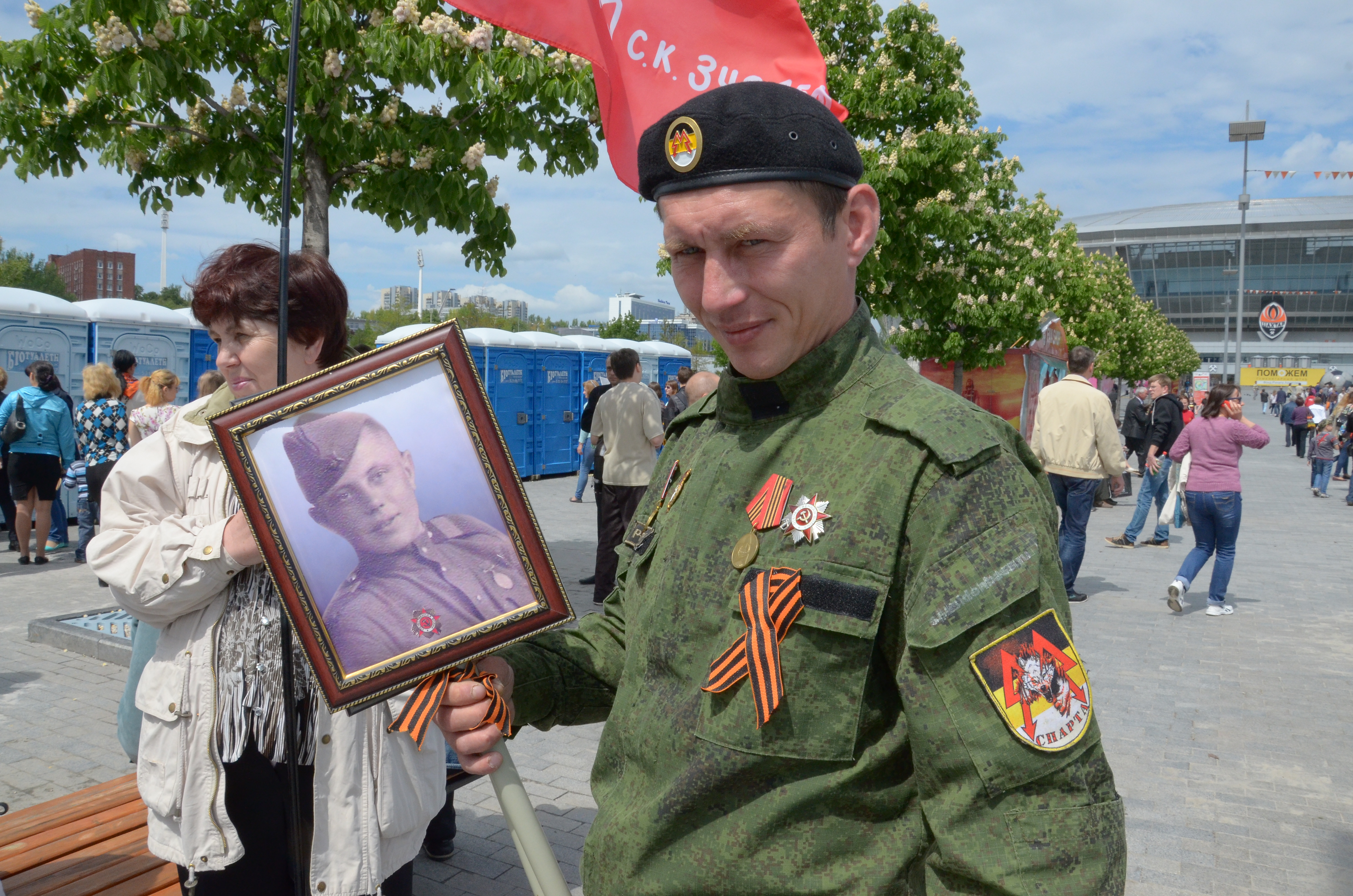
Sparta Battalion soldier wears an EMR uniform and a Ribbon of Saint George during the 2016 Victory Day parade in Donetsk.

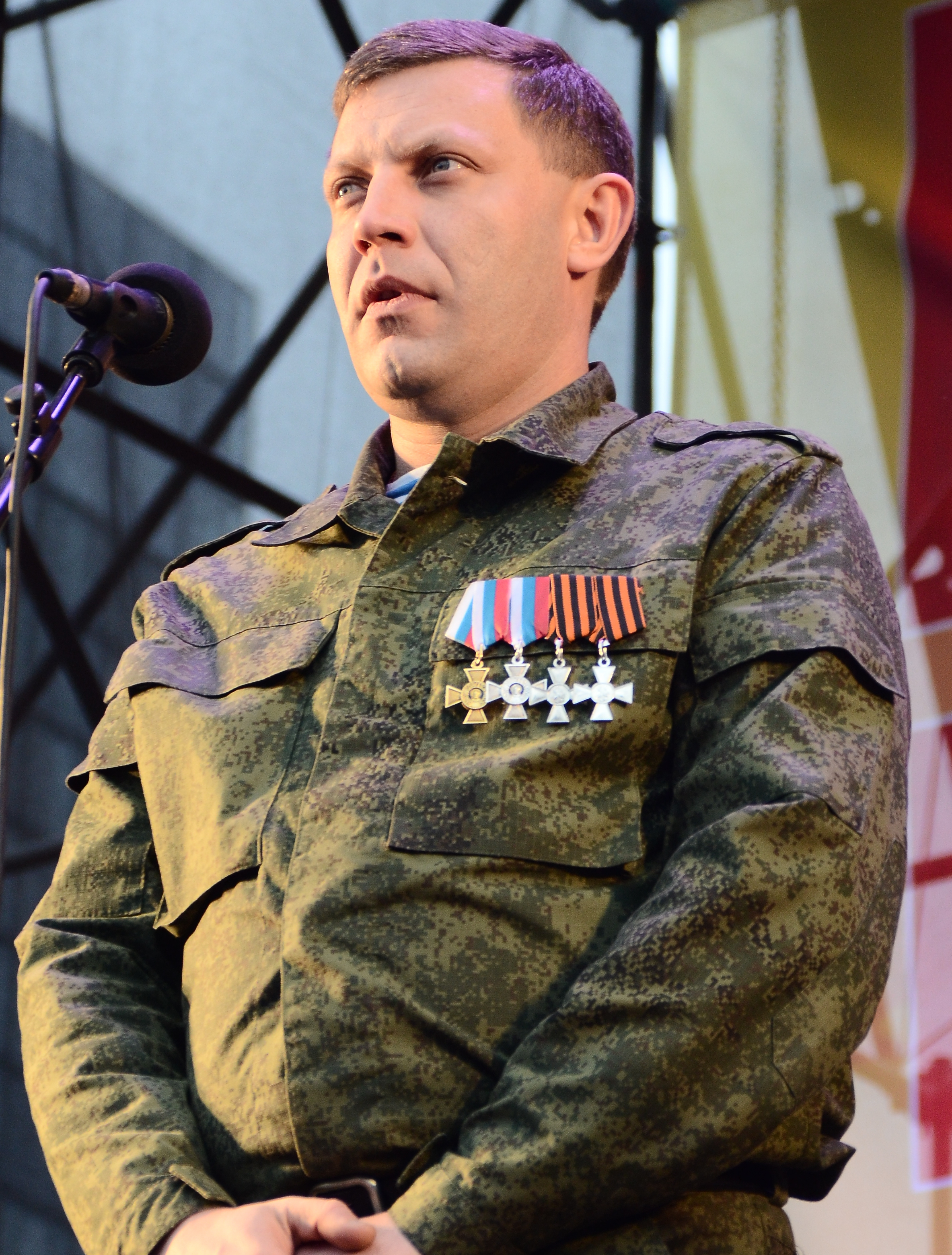
Head of the Donetsk People's Republic Alexander Zakharchenko with EMR fatigues

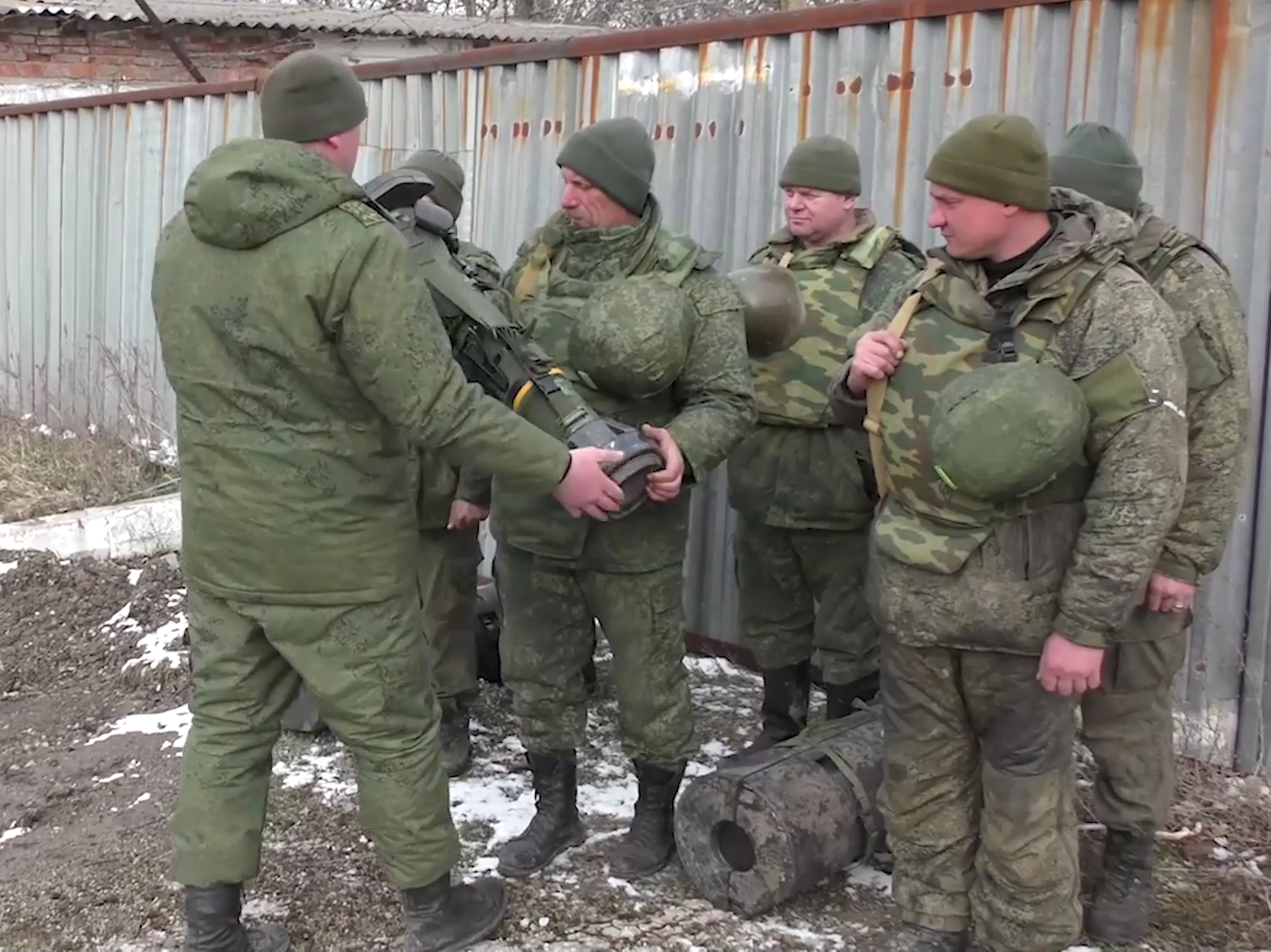
Separatist troops with EMR uniforms during the Russian invasion of Ukraine in 2022

== See also ==
- Uniforms of the Russian Armed Forces
