= Superimposition =

Artistic technique

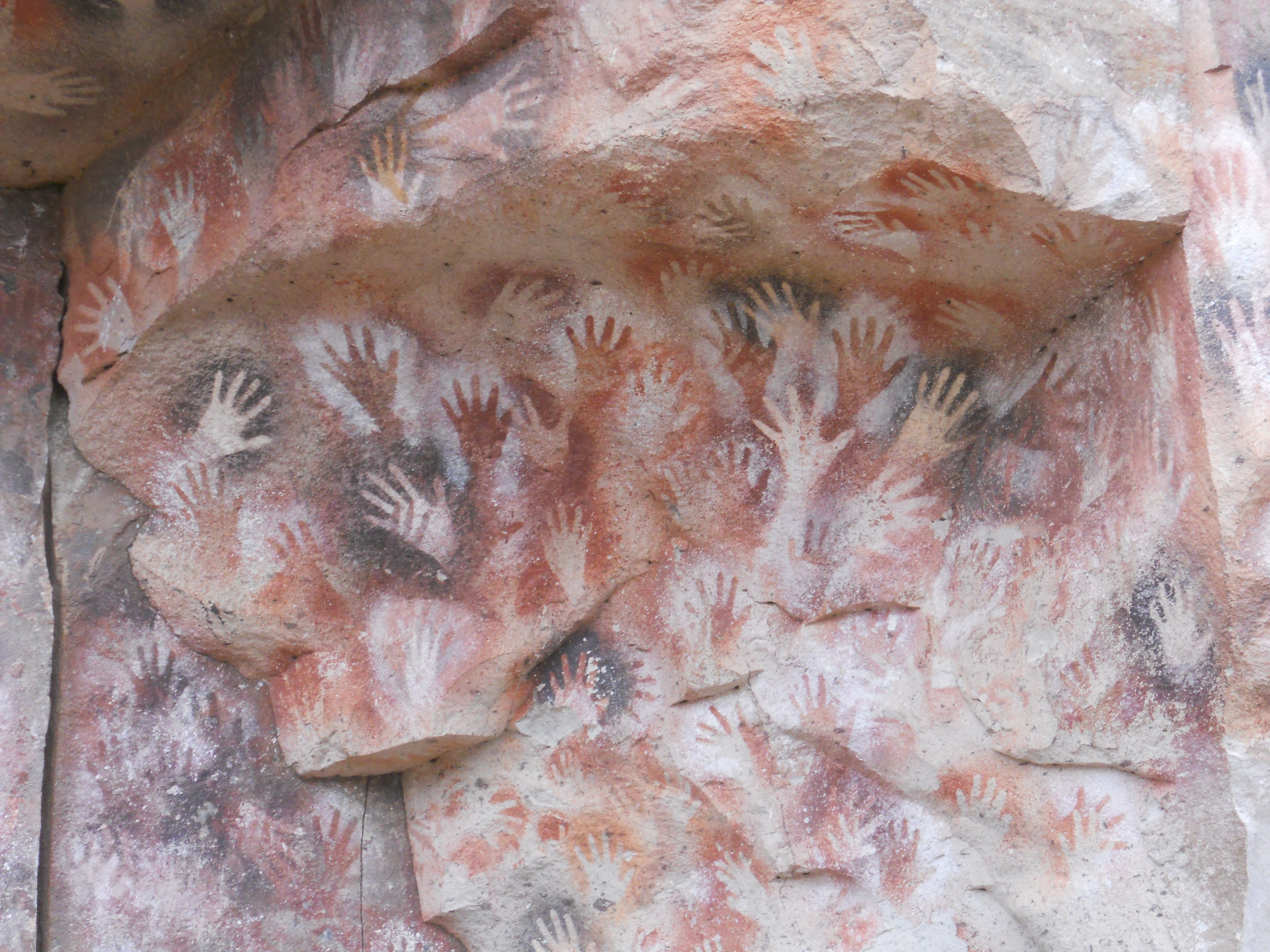
Superimposition of hand stencils at Cueva de las Manos

Superimposition is the placement of one thing over another, typically so that both are still evident. Superimpositions are often related to the mathematical procedure of superposition.

== Audio ==
Superimposition (SI) during sound recording and reproduction (commonly called overdubbing) is the process of adding new sounds over existing ones without completely erasing or masking the existing sound. Some reel-to-reel tape recorders of the mid-20th century provided crude superimposition facilities that were implemented by killing the high-frequency AC feed to the erase head while recording as normal via the read-write head.

== 2D images ==
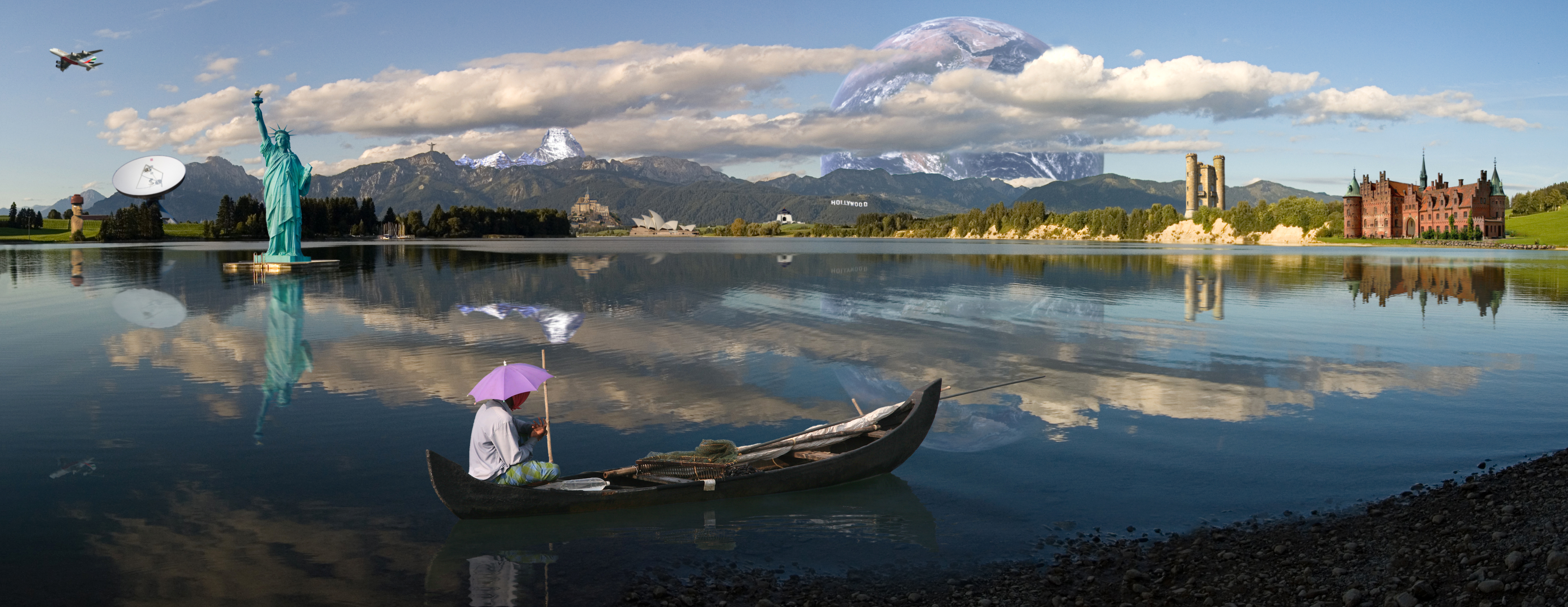
A digitally manipulated image featuring various images superimposed onto a photograph of a lake

In graphics, superimposition is the placement of an image or video on top of an already-existing image or video, usually to add to the overall image effect, but also sometimes to conceal something (such as when a different face is superimposed over the original face in a photograph).

Superimposition of two-dimensional images containing correlated periodic grid structures may produce moiré patterns. Superimposition of two correlated layers comprising parallel lines or curves may give rise line moiré patterns. The movement of one of the layers results in a faster movement of the line moiré superimposition image. Such optical acceleration is known as moiré speedup (check for the formulas of optical speedup for curved patterns). When superimposing two identical layers comprising randomly spaced parallel lines, at a small angle or with a small scaling difference random line moiré patterns, namely line Glass patterns (after Leon Glass, 1969) appear. Similarly, when superimposing two identical layers of randomly scattered dots at a small angle or with a small scaling difference random dot Glass patterns, namely random dot moiré, appears. When one of the layers embeds complex shapes, such as sequences of symbols forming a text, and another layer contains parallel lines or curves, the superimposition image may give rise to magnified shapes, called shape moiré patterns.

=== Cartography ===
This technique is used in cartography to produce photomaps by superimposing grid lines, contour lines and other linear or textual mapping features over aerial photographs.

=== Forensics ===
Photographic superimposition is a forensic technique. This can include craniofacial superimposition, which compares skulls of the deceased with images of them through the overlap of photographs.

== See also ==
- Forensic facial reconstruction
- Multiple exposure
