= Moire (disambiguation) =

A moire, moiré pattern or moiré fringe is an interference pattern.

Moire or Moiré may also refer to:

- Moiré, Rhône, a commune in France
- Moire (fabric), a textile with a wavy appearance
- Emmanuel Moire (born 1979), French singer
- Milo Moiré (born 1983), Swiss pornographic actress and artist

== See also ==
- Line moiré, a type of moiré pattern
- Moiré deflectometry, produces results that appears similar to an interferometry technique
- Shape moiré, a type of moiré pattern
- Moires, a town and a former municipality in Greece
- Moir (disambiguation)
