= Boho-chic =

Fashion style

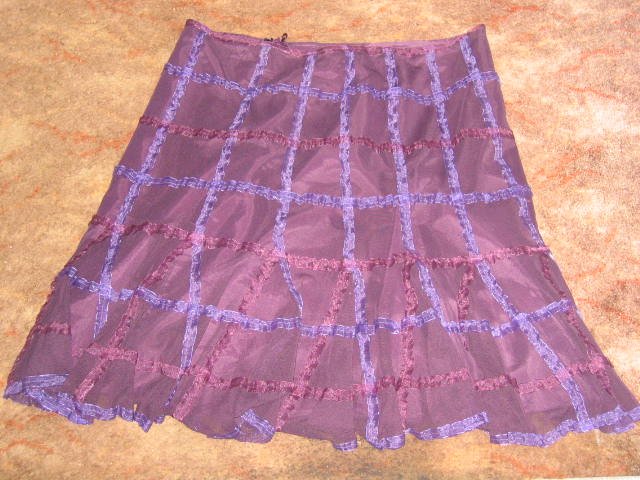
Short floaty skirt, 2005

Boho-chic is a style of fashion drawing on various bohemian and hippie influences, which, at its height in late 2005 was associated particularly with actress Sienna Miller, model Kate Moss in the United Kingdom and actress/businesswoman Mary-Kate Olsen in the United States. It has been seen since the early 1990s and, although appearing to wane from time to time, has repeatedly re-surfaced in varying guises. Many elements of boho-chic became popular in the late 1960s and some date back much further, being associated, for example, with pre-Raphaelite women of the mid-to-late 19th century.

Luxe grunge (also known as luxe bohemian) may be a synonym; a chicer updated grunge-boho collection with an unkempt approach to wardrobe. First motivated by Seattle's groundbreaking rock scene in the 1990s – the modern update contains all the mainstays of yesterday's grunge (flannel, plaid, layers and leg warmers) alongside today's sophisticated pieces, including capes, shawls and jackets. Grunge elements featured strongly in fashion collections in Autumn 2006, including styles referred to "cocktail grunge" and "modern goth". Lisa Armstrong, fashion editor of the London Times, referred to Patrick Lichfield's iconic 1969 photograph of Talitha Getty on a Marrakesh roof-top as "typif[ying] the luxe bohemian look"

== Lexicography ==
Sherlock Holmes "upon the sofa in a purple dressing gown" in The Adventure of the Blue Carbuncle (Illustration by Sidney Paget, Strand Magazine, 1891)

=== "Boho" ===
"BoHo" is a shortened form of bohemian, self descriptive of the style.

Virginia Nicholson (granddaughter of Vanessa Bell, one of the pivotal figures of the unconventional, but influential "Bloomsbury Group" in the first half of the 20th century) has described it as a "curious slippery adjective". Although the original Bohemians were inhabitants of central Europe, the term has, as Nicholson noted, "attached itself to individuals as disparate as Shakespeare and Sherlock Holmes". The writer and historian A. N. Wilson remarked that, "in his dress-sense as in much else", Winston Churchill was "pre-First World War Bohemian", his unbleached linen suit causing surprise when he arrived in Canada in 1943.

In Arthur Conan Doyle's first short story about Holmes for The Strand, Doctor Watson noted that the detective "loathed every form of society with his whole Bohemian soul". Designer Savannah Miller, elder sister of actress Sienna Miller, described a "real bohemian" as "someone who has the ability to appreciate beauty on a deep level, is a profound romantic, doesn't know any limits, whose world is their own creation, rather than living in a box".

=== "Chic" ===
"Chic" was borrowed from French in the late 19th century and has come to mean stylish or elegant.

== Elements ==
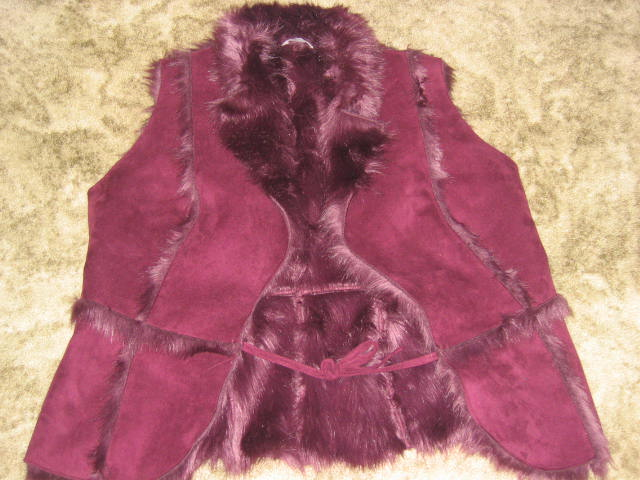
Furry gilet, Autumn 2005

The boho look, which owed much to the hippie styles that developed in the middle to late 1960s, became especially popular after Sienna Miller's appearance at the Glastonbury Festival in 2004, although some of its features were apparent from photographs of her taken in October 2003 and of others living in or around the postal district of W10 (North Kensington), an area of London associated with bohemian culture since the mid-1950s.

By the spring of 2005, boho was almost ubiquitous in parts of London and was invading stores in almost every British high street. Its adherents were sometimes referred to as "Siennas", this eponym even being applied to Miller herself: "Sienna's Sienna-ishness", as Jessica Brinton put it in the Sunday Times in 2007. Features included "floaty" skirts (notably long white ones), furry gilets, embroidered tunics, cropped jackets, large faux-coin belts, sheepskin (UGG) boots and cowboy boots, baggy cardigans and "hobo bags". Demand was so great that there were allegations the following year of some sub-contractors' having used cheap child labour in India for zari embroidery and beading.

Footless tights or "leggings", of which Miller was a proponent, were a contributory factor in the halving of sales of stockings in Britain between 2003 and 2007.

== Trends ==
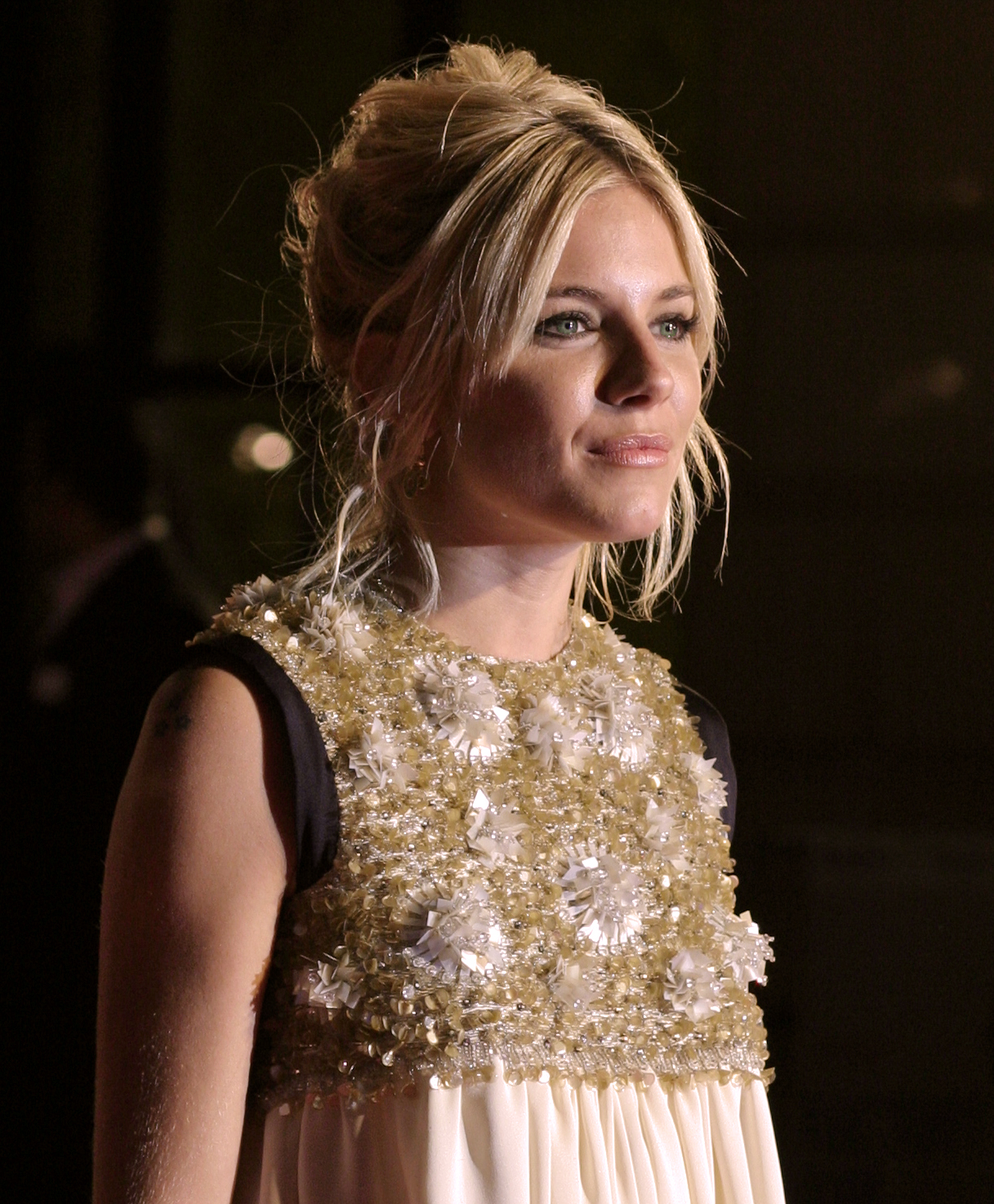
Sienna Miller at the London premiere of Factory Girl, 2007

=== Sienna Miller in the mid 2000s ===
Sienna Miller's relationship with – and, for a time, engagement to – actor Jude Law, after they had starred together in the 2004 film, Alfie, kept both her and her style of dress in the media headlines during 2004–05. In December 2004, Vogue featured Miller on its front cover and described her as "the girl of the year". Later, the ending of her relationship with Law (which resumed temporarily in 2009–10) seemed to signal that boho too was past its peak. In fact, as early as May 2005 the Sunday Times Style magazine had declared that "overexposed" white peasant skirts were "going down" and had advised adherents of boho to "update your boho mojo" by mixing the look with metallic items (anticipating so-called "boho-rock" in 2006) or with layers. By the end of 2005, Miller herself, who claimed later that her boho look was not very original – "I think I'd just come back from traveling or something" – had adopted other styles of dress and her shorter, bobbed hairstyle – ironically a feature of bohemian fashion in the quarter century before World War II – helped to define a new trend in 2007. She was quoted in Vogue as saying "no more boho chic ... I feel less hippie. I just don't want to wear anything floaty or coin-belty ever again. No more gilets ...". Even so, in 2008, Miller reflected that

It was a strange social experiment, to be responsible for all that. It made me self-conscious, which, inherently, I'm not. People would say, "I'm sick of boho", and now I stand up and say, "But I liked those clothes – it's not my fault that they were copied, you wore them and now you're sick of them. Also, I did not start the trend."

=== 2007–08: folk, "diluted", and Balearic boho ===
In the autumn of 2006, The Times' style director Tina Gaudoin observed that "when the women's wear buyer at M[arks] & S[pencer] is quoted saying 'boho is over', you know the trend is well and truly six foot under." Even so, the so-called "folk" look of spring 2007, with its smock tops and flounce hemmed dresses, owed much to boho-chic, while embracing such trends as the re-emergence of the mini-dress: as the Sunday Times put it, "if you are still bemoaning the passing of the gypsy look, then the folk trend could be your saving grace". The Sunday Times cited the 1960s singer Mary Hopkin as influencing the use of bandannas, while, around the same time, Sienna Miller's appearance as 1960s "starlet" Edie Sedgwick in the film Factory Girl positioned her once more as a bohemian style icon. London Lite observed in May 2007 that:

You may baulk at the very word, but this summer's style has definite nuances of boho – albeit in a very diluted form. Sienna Miller's gipsy skirt brigade somehow didn't finish this feminine trend off for good, and some of the less contrived ingredients – embroidery, leather, gentle frills – are back

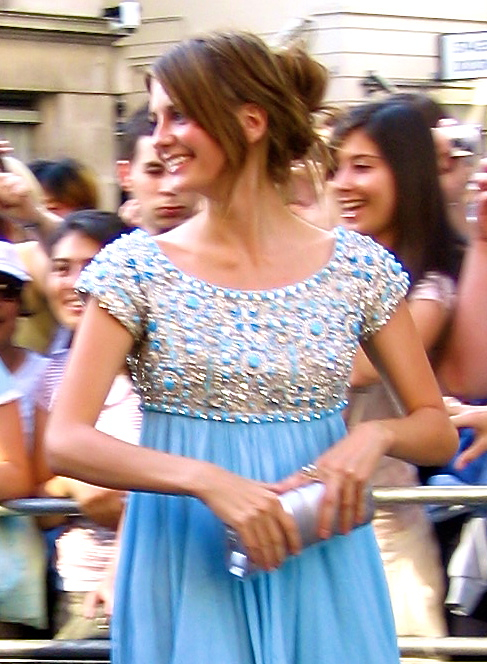
Mischa Barton in 2006

Noting that "this time it's much more about a deconstructed, looser version of English Country Garden style", London Lite recalled the early 1970s designs of Laura Ashley – "all folds of floral cotton and centre partings". Actresses Mischa Barton and Milla Jovovich were cited as exponents of this look, while Jade Jagger (daughter of Sir Mick Jagger, of the Rolling Stones, and Bianca Jagger) was said to be promoting her own style of "Balearic boho" on the Mediterranean island of Ibiza, a long-time haven for beatniks and hippies who colonised the village of Sant Carles in the 1960s.

The Tatler wrote of Jagger – "the original 'Boho'" – that she "lives, breathes and creates a certain kind of contemporary "bohemian" chic", although Jagger herself claimed to be "a little wary of the word "bohemian"", describing her approach as "daring to mix ... combining things that are unexpected". Jagger modelled for designer Matthew Williamson, whose style has been described as combining "Ibiza glamour" with "London cool". Sienna Miller has written that, when she first met Williamson, whose muse she became, in her mother's kitchen in 2001

she had a magazine on the table with Jade Jagger wearing the most beautiful bright dress I had ever seen. I remember thinking it was my dream dress. I now feel that way about almost every dress of Matthew's I have worn".

In 2011 "destination dressing" for Ibiza was still deemed to "embrace boho chic with a hint of understated glamour"

When, in August 2007, Sienna and Savannah Miller launched their own fashion label, Twenty8Twelve (so-called after Sienna's birthday, 28 December), one commentator referred to Sienna's "own brand of Notting Hillbilly chic" (a reference to London W10) and remarked that, "with [her] love of all things boho, it's unsurprising to see a thread of louche, folksy styling running through the line". However, the same writer observed wryly that "quite how many French peasants hoed fields in printed smocks is undocumented" and felt that one particular shirt-dress was "a little too reminiscent of Nancy in Oliver Twist". The following year, the Sunday Times, noting that one in two Americans and one in five Britons were reportedly sporting tattoos, observed that Miller "complete[d] her luxe-layabout look with a cluster of stars on her silken shoulder"; that she had also a tattoo of a bluebird, the subject of both a poem by Charles Bukowski and a drawing by Edie Sedgwick; and that Kate Moss displayed "two swallows diving into her buttock crack".

=== Recession of 2008–10: broderie, exotic lingerie, 70s glam/beatnik ===
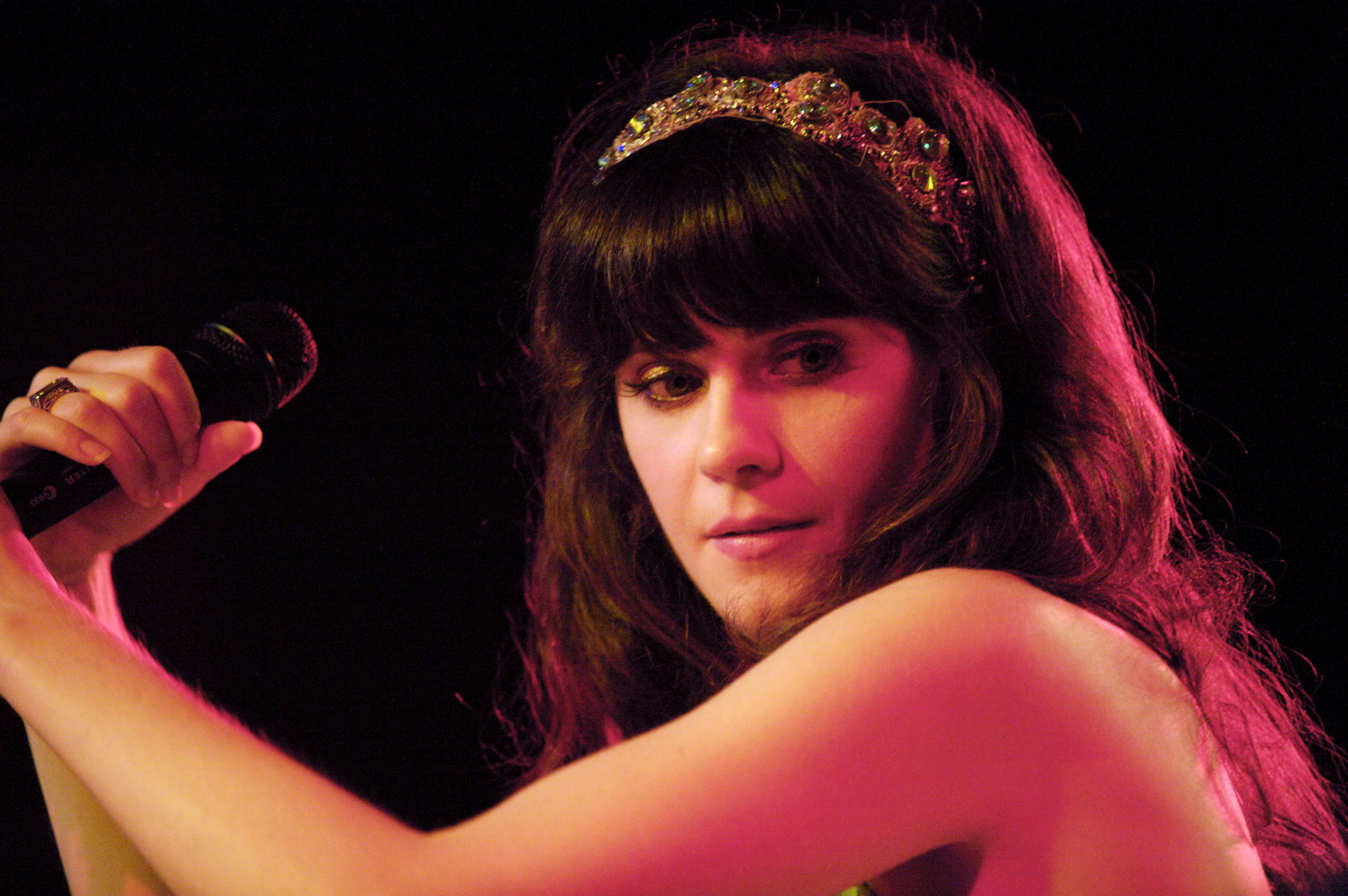
Zooey Deschanel in 2008

In 2008 fashion consultant Gok Wan cited a broderie anglaise top worn by Nadine Coyle of the group Girls Aloud as evidence that "the folk/boho look is so hot for summer", while Marks & Spencer employed the headline "Bohemian Rhapsody" to summarise its summer range, which owed much to the colours and patterns of the early 1970s. At the beginning of June that year fashion writer Carrie Gorman announced that "this week, shopping is about going bright and bold with a boho feel", citing, among other trends, multi-coloured tank tops ("or dress, according to your height") by Harlow, said to be the favorite label of American actress Rachel Bilson. Bilson has cited Kate Moss and actress Diane Keaton as among her stylistic influences; striped multi-colored panties with brodierie edging were a feature of her photographic shoot for Stuff magazine in 2004.

Another, rather distinctive, exponent of the "vintage" look was actress and singer Zooey Deschanel, who, in June 2008, appeared on the front cover of the magazine BlackBook in a black lace-edged swimsuit. In the same year, a journalist wrote of Deschanel:

... she's the antistarlet ... She tiptoes in looking like a graceful version of boho-chic 29-year-olds found everywhere from Brooklyn to Silver Lake, with an Obama [Democratic Presidential candidate] button on her vintage coat and [t]he New Yorker rolled up in her pocket...

Deschanel's "kooky" style subsequently found a popular outlet as Los Angeles teacher Jess Day, whom she played in the Fox TV sitcom, New Girl (2011–2018). Jess's fashion preferences, including some striking brassières in a range of colours, attracted much interest, while, around the same time, Anastasia (Ana) Steel's tastes in E. L. James' best-selling erotic novel Fifty Shades of Grey (2011) were thought to have assisted sales of exotic lingerie. Blue was a favoured color (Natalie Portman as Dr. Emma Kurtzman was shown dressing hastily for work in a lacy blue bra in the 2011 film, No Strings Attached) and was Ana's own preference: "I'm in the pale blue lacy perfect-fit bra. Thank heavens". In 2010, the winning German entry for the Eurovision Song Contest proclaimed, "I even did my hair for you/I bought new underwear, they're blue" (Satellite, sung by Lena). In 2013 X Factor contestant Diana Vickers wore blue panties (with a short white top bearing the legend, "LOST MY MIND") for a widely publicised photoshoot for the magazine FHM.

Although boho once again appeared to be on the wane by 2009, elements of it were clearly in evidence in collections for spring and summer 2010. Fashion Union advertised "spring's new bohemian trend in full bloom" and "hippie chic tops on loveworn denims", while Avon introduced a perfumed spray called "Boho Chic". Monsoon, founded in 1973 and still described by the Sunday Times in 2010 as "the boho chic fashion retailer", saw its pre-tax profits rise dramatically during the recession of the late noughties: from £3.6 million in 2008 to £32.6 million in the year to August 2009.

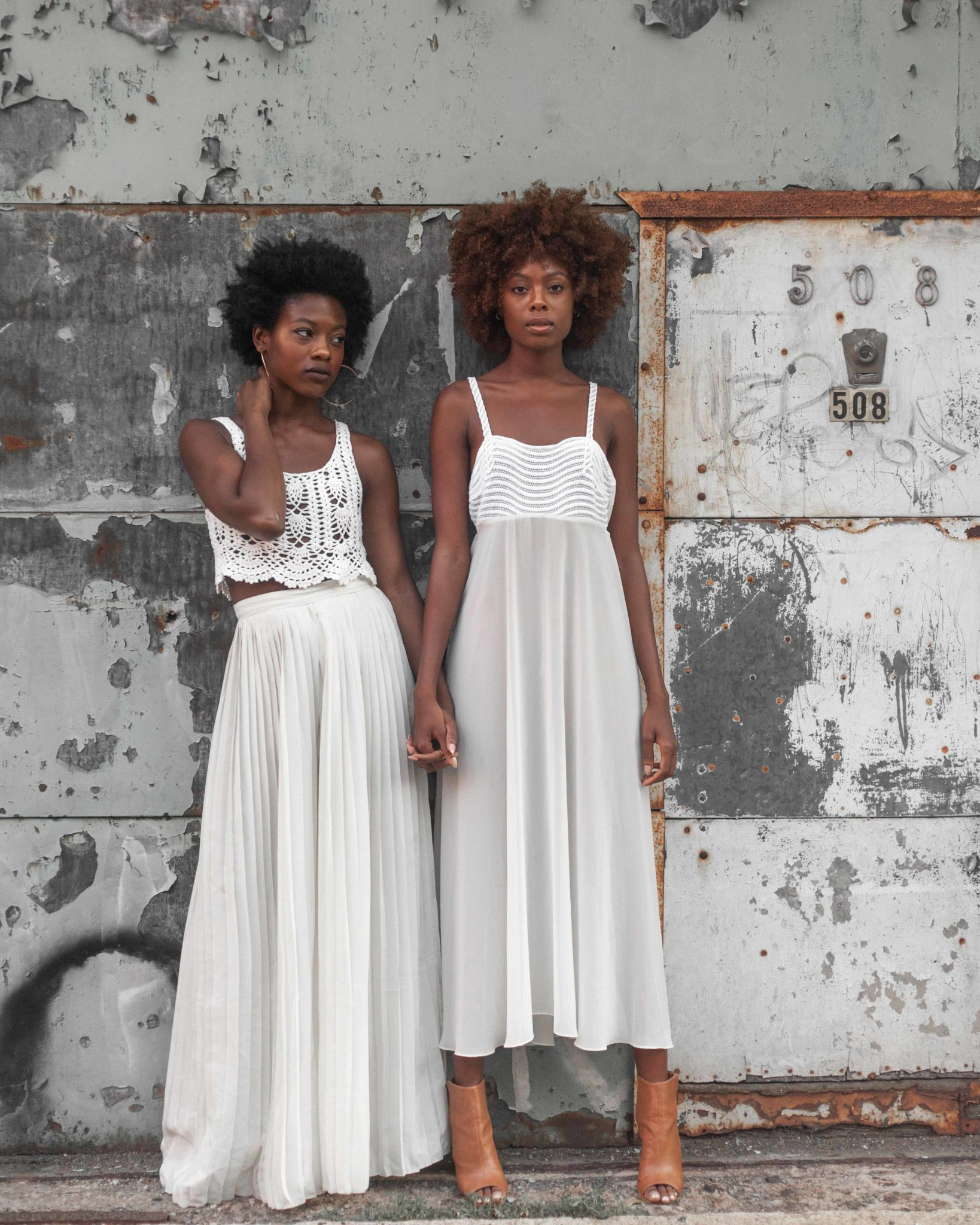
Women wearing bohemian clothing

In 2010 the Sunday Times anticipated that the medieval head chain – "a step on from the hippie head band" – would be a feature of that year's festival circuit, "instantly adding summer bohemia to your look". Socialite Nicole Richie's "beatnik/disco-glam mash-up" was cited as an example of this trend, while Peaches Geldof, model and daughter of rock musician Bob Geldof, was identified as another who had adopted the look. Later in the year the Sunday Times lauded the "haute hippie, bohemian splendour and punked up classics" that were putting "a modern spin on 1970s style". These included a cream crochet dress by Marc Jacobs ("haute hippie") and a devoré dress and fringed scarf by Pucci ("boho splendour").

By the late autumn of 2010 The Times noted the desirability in the UK of fake fur ("Recession chic lets Britain go full pelt for the fake fur"), with Marks & Spencer and Sainsbury's TU retailing bestselling coats at a time of economic stringency. According to Lisa Armstrong, "everyone from Kate Moss to Alexa Chung, Fearne Cotton to Kylie [Minogue], Rachel Bilson and Taylor Momsen to Carine Roitfeld ha[d] been swaddling themselves in exotic cat prints with varying degrees of success". Armstrong speculated also that the "Impossible Boot", based on a 1930s snow boot and so-called by its designer Penelope Chilvers because it had "proved a headache to make", might, despite its relatively high cost (£325–375), displace the Ugg, which had been a durable boho accessory. As Armstrong put it wrily, the Impossible was "perfect for après-ski" in the fashionably bohemian London districts of Primrose Hill or Dalston.

=== Children's fashion ===
Many parents have also embraced the Boho Chic trends and elements to create and purchase apparel for their children. This particular trend is inspired by the casual American fashion of the 1960s, but as the counterculture included the influences of earlier time periods in its eclectic embrace of style and personal values, it often includes hints of the Victorian, a nod to the fabrics and details of the 1940s, or a homage to the intellectuals of the 1950s.

== Influence and exponents ==
=== Kate Moss and Sienna Miller ===
Many, including actress Lindsay Lohan, attributed the boho look to supermodel Kate Moss (who in 1997 had been associated, through an advertising campaign for Calvin Klein, with the so-called "heroin chic" or "waif" look). In fact the Australian journalist Laura Demasi used the term "boho-chic" as early as October 2002 with reference to Moss and Jade Jagger. In April 2004, the British-born fashion writer Plum Sykes was quoted as saying of a lynx mini-top, "Very cool, very bohemian, very Kate Moss–y"; and in 2006 Times fashion editor Lisa Armstrong described a plaited leather belt of the previous year as a "Boho 'Kate' belt". Nevertheless, it was the apparently unaffected ease with which Sienna Miller (dubbed by some as the "new Kate Moss") carried off the look that brought it into the mainstream: even in advertisements for Chloé early in 2005 Miller was shown as if casually shopping, while she told Vogue that she had a laid-back approach to grooming, including cutting her own hair.

Established in 1993, the UK clothing label 'OVERIDER' described as 'the brand of a free spirit' and favoured for its understated, effortless, bohemian style exemplifies the 2014 Boho-chic trend.

In 2008 the Sunday Times applied the term "real chic" to a group of "the chicest celebrities", including Miller and actresses Julie Christie and Marion Cotillard, who "handle the glare of fame with a large dose of reality", Miller being described as "a professional free spirit who, annoyingly, seems to have more fun than anyone else". In that year, Miller's appearance as the poet Dylan Thomas's wife, Caitlin Macnamara in the film The Edge of Love caused one journalist to refer to "a new romantic style: woe-ho chic" This referred to the austerity clothing of the 1940s, worn also in the film by Keira Knightley:

A beguillingly shambolic Sienna is seen sobbing on the beach busting a wartime make-do-and-mend look: boiled-wool cardie over flowery tea dress over folded-down wellies over long woolly socks.

One reviewer observed of Miller's role that "Caitlin is meant to be a boho girl and free spirit, which is a posh way of saying she's a drunk who is promiscuous".

=== Rachel Zoe ===
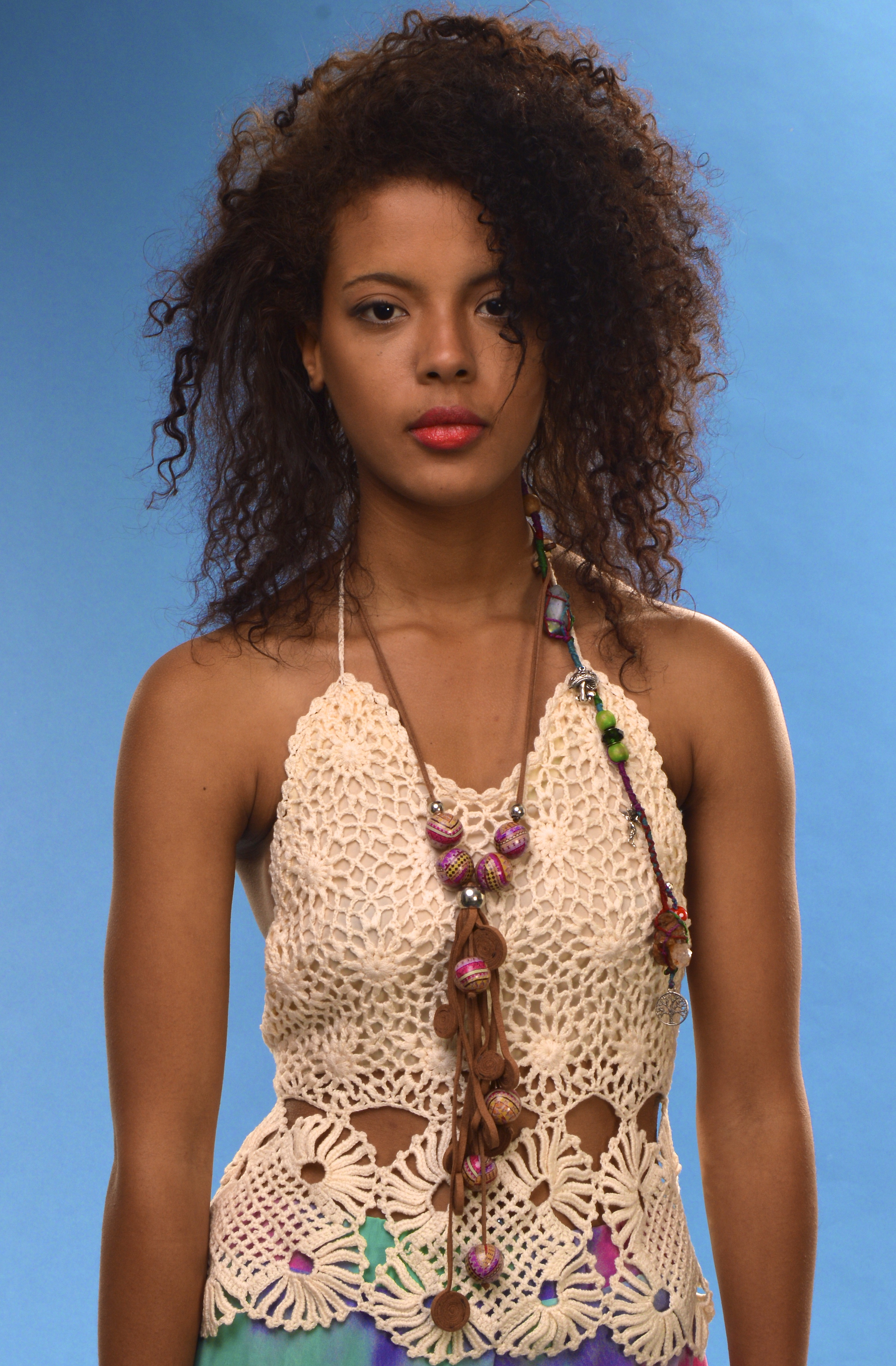
Boho Chic

American celebrity stylist Rachel Zoe has been credited as helping to popularise boho style in the 2000s. Writing in Guardian, Lauren Cochrane wrote, that Zoe "was one of the first stylists to put the vintage "look" on the red carpet." A retrospective piece published in Grazia in 2000 said of Zoe: "Styling her clients not just for the red carpet but for pap-bait Starbucks runs, she was the architect of the boho-meets-rock chic look that came to define a new breed of Hollywood ‘it’-girls who were as adept at setting trends as they were at causing trouble: Nicole Richie, Lindsay Lohan, Mischa Barton exemplified the moment (pre their The Row paring-down, the Olsens - not Zoe clients - were working a similar look)." The look championed by Zoe was exemplified by oversized accessories such as sunglasses and handbags paired with loose-fitting tops and dresses.

=== Appeal and impact ===
The cross-generational appeal of boho influenced, among other things, the ranges that brought about a revival in the fortunes of Marks and Spencer in 2005–06. An illustration of this, just as boho as such appeared to near its end, was M&S's use of 1960s' icon Twiggy and younger models such as Laura Bailey ("the natural choice for the season's bohemian chic") for a major advertising campaign in late 2005. In 2006 the Sunday Times identified fur gilets and "ugg-a-likes" as preferred winter wear for middle-aged women whom it described as the "botox-and-better-sex-after-40 brigade".

=== Exemplars ===
Notwithstanding an early tendency to be associated with photographic spreads for "lads' magazines") Rachel Stevens were both held up in the mid-noughties as exemplars of boho. So, a few years later, were Diana Vickers and another teenaged singer, Pixie Lott.

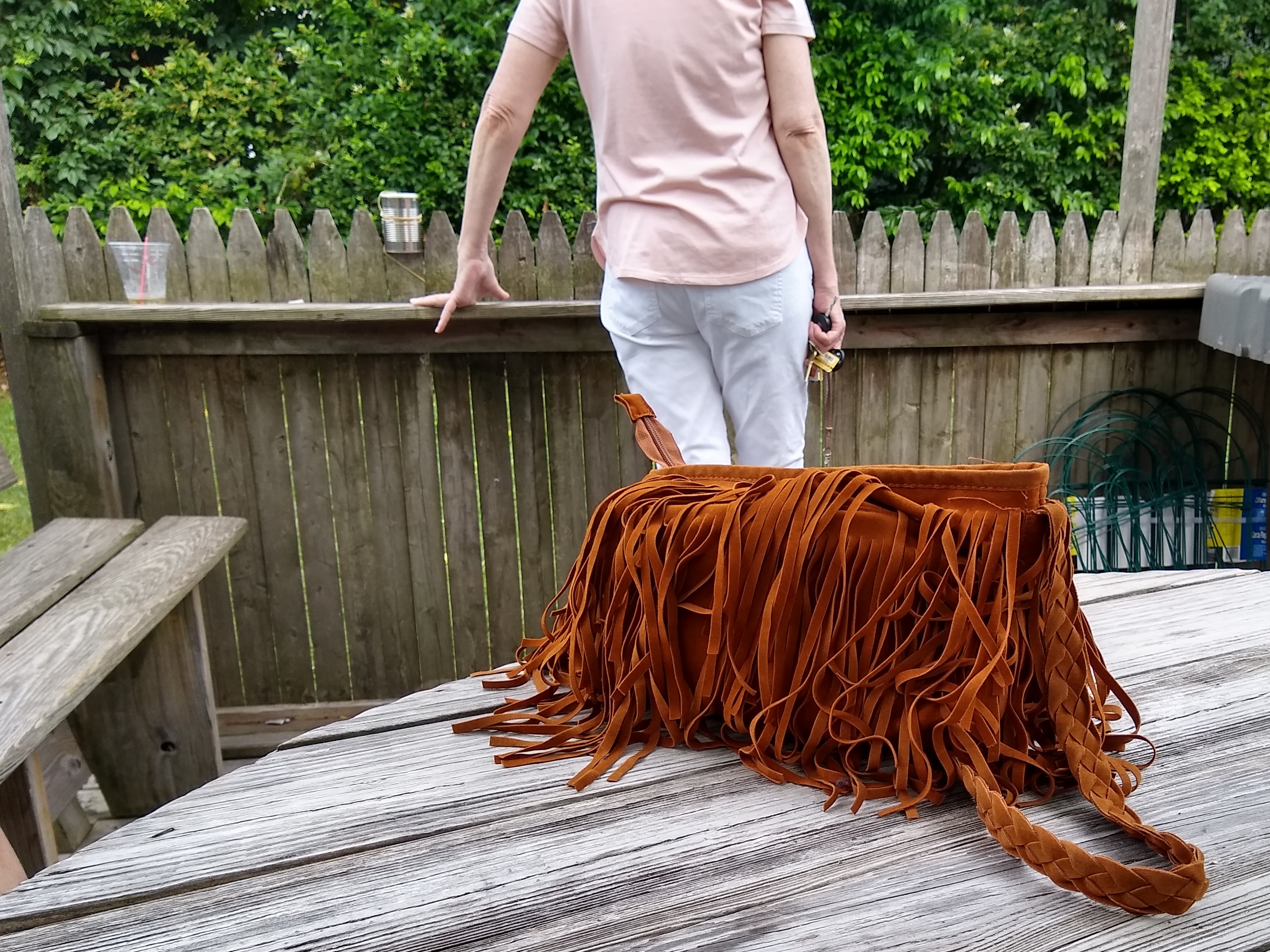
A fringe suede leather handbag.

In 2007 London Lite contrasted the "gay glamour" of American actress Goldie Hawn with the "more relaxed, boho look" of her daughter, actress Kate Hudson, noting that "keeping the colours neutral, [Hudson]'s careful not to break any style rules, with classy knitwear and good-quality accessories".

Another well-judged exponent of boho, in the second series of ITV's Murder in Suburbia (2005), was Detective Sergeant Emma Scribbins, the character played by Lisa Faulkner.

=== Fast fashion ===
The impact of boho illustrated certain broader trends in what Shane Watson referred to as "the way we dress now": that fashion was increasingly being dictated, not by the main houses, but what Watson called "the triple-F crowd" (the F referring to the f's in "famous and fashion-forward"), of which Kate Moss, Lindsay Lohan and Sienna Miller were exemplars. Once they had spotted new fashions, young women were not prepared to wait a season for them to become available and, consequently, the familiar boundaries between summer wear and that for autumn and winter were becoming blurred. As Jane Shepherdson, brand director of the clothing chain Topshop, put it, "when Sienna wore that gilet, we had to pull them forward fast ... She was doing boho in the autumn, and we were expecting it to be a trend for the following spring. Girls see it and they want it immediately".

The practice of meeting such demand, pioneered by the Spanish firm Zara, and of which Shepherdson, until she left Topshop in 2006, was the leading British proponent, became known as "fast fashion".

== Boho-rock and gothic ==
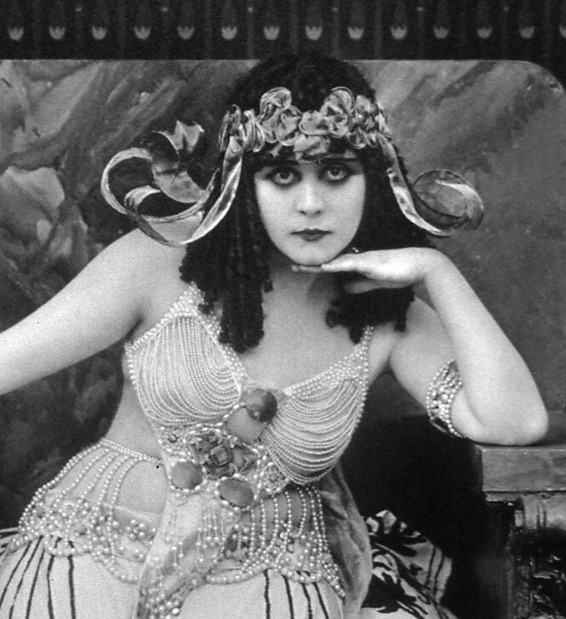
Theda Bara (1885–1955)

By Midsummer 2006, the Sunday Times had discerned a trend that fused aspects of boho-chic with "heavy metal attitude": "It's about wearing a studded leather jacket with a flimsy chiffon number, stomping about town in biker boots ... and wearing anything with a skull on it". The newspaper referred to this style, which had been a feature of collections for Autumn 2006 by Christian Dior and John Galliano, as "boho-rock" and noted that both Sienna Miller and Kate Moss had adopted it. "Gothic rock" had similar connotations. A look described by the Sunday Times in Autumn 2006 as "modern goth" was a more stylised version, exuding a "bondage vibe" and contrasting "soft, light fabrics ... with the harsh sleekness of patent [leather]".

The gothic look was in vogue again in the autumn of 2007, a sleeker "dark Victorian style" being associated with, among others, Sienna Miller, twin actresses Mary-Kate and Ashley Olsen (through their clothing label, The Row), the Australian model Gemma Ward and the rising Ukrainian singer Mika Newton (the latter notably in photographs associated with her début album of 2005, Anomaliya).

=== Pre-Raphaelites ===
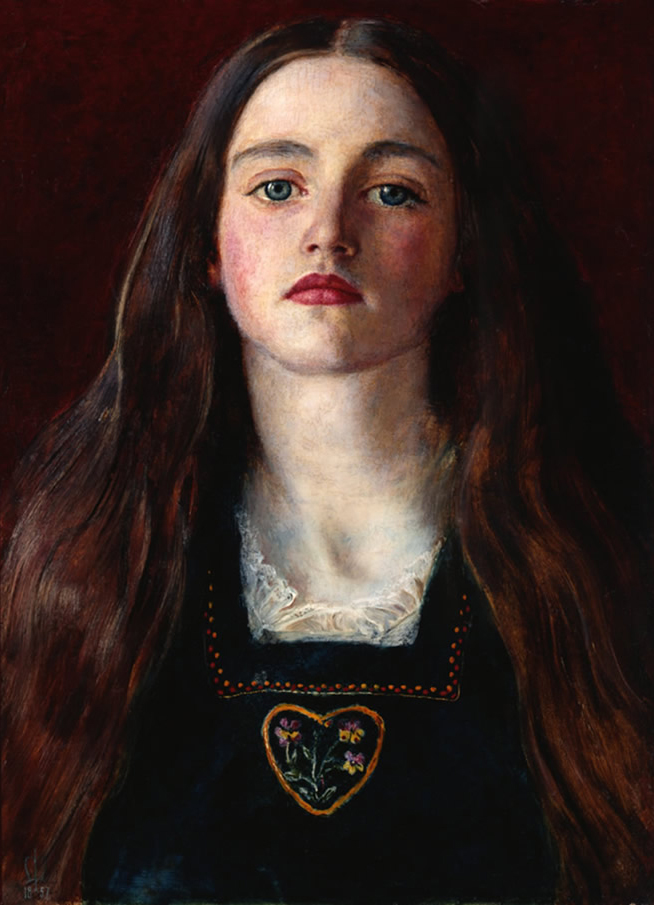
Pre-Raphaelite muse: Sophie Gray by John Everett Millais, 1857

==== Florence Welch ====
"In 2009 the rise of British singer Florence Welch (as Florence + the Machine) coincided with the publication of Franny Moyle's study of the private lives of the Pre-Raphaelite Brotherhood of the mid-19th century (Desperate Romantics, 2009) and its dramatisation by BBC television. Welch has cited as her stylistic icons singer Marianne Faithfull, who had been closely associated with the Rolling Stones in the 1960s, and her former English teacher who used to "come to school in crushed-velvet gowns like a medieval maiden However, her stage image called to mind the pre-Raphaelite muses who, in certain respects, had anticipated the hippie styles of a century later. Indeed, Welch herself declared her attraction to "doomed romantic heroines, like Tennyson's [poem] The Lady of Shalott" The cover of Welch's second album Ceremonials (2011) drew very clearly on later Pre-Raphaelite images.

Reflecting on Welch's broader influence, one rock journalist noted in 2010 that "even Cheryl Cole [of Girls Aloud and an X Factor judge] has gone gothic princess on her ... single, "Promise This", and she's looking very Florence in the video, all black leotards and raggedy tutus".

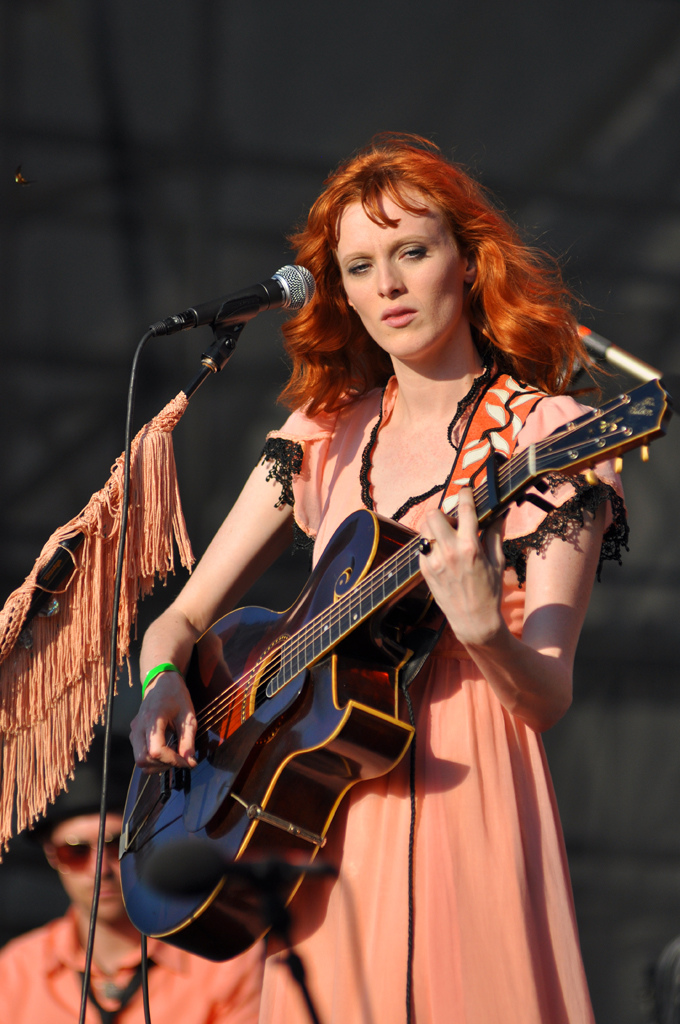
Karen Elson in June 2010

==== Karen Elson ====
Other redheads whose personal style combined elegance with boho and gothic features were English model Lily Cole and model/singer Karen Elson. Elson told a Times journalist that she had always been "the weird looking one" in modelling circles and remarked of herself and her then husband Jack White of the rock duo White Stripes that "there's going to be a point when our children view us as the Addams Family". (In the 1960s incarnation of The Addams Family for ABC television, based on the characters created by Charles Addams for The New Yorker in 1938, Carolyn Jones had created a gothic icon with her portrayal of Morticia Addams.) Like Welch, Elson exuded pre-Raphaelite features, though a marked gothic strain was also apparent when, as a singer on stage in 2009, she wore a long salmon dress with black lace edging. Similarly, her lingerie portfolio that year for Agent Provocateur combined gothic and boho-rock features, there being, for example, a certain resonance between a black and white brassiere and panties set that formed part of that collection and the black swimsuit in which Zooey Deschanel was photographed in 2008.

==== Catherine, Duchess of Cambridge ====
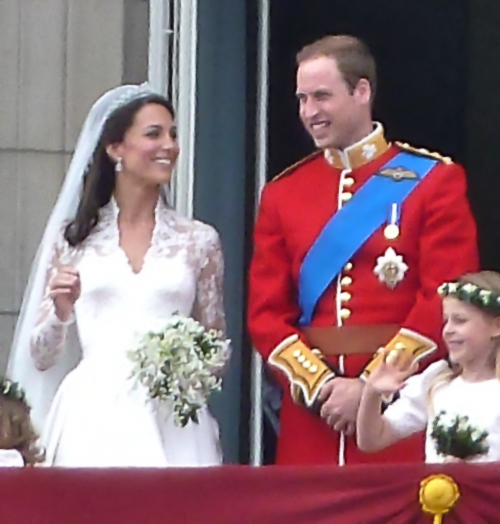
The Duchess of Cambridge, in Alexander McQueen dress by Sarah Burton, with Prince William, Duke of Cambridge on their wedding day, 2011

In 2011 some detected a pre-Raphaelite line to the Alexander McQueen dress, designed by Sarah Burton, for Catherine Middleton's wedding to Prince William, Duke of Cambridge, Middleton's somewhat medieval headdress called to mind images from paintings by such later pre-Raphaelites as John Waterhouse and Edward Burne-Jones, the overall impression being especially apparent in a side-on double page photograph of the couple by Max Mumby on the cover of the following day's edition of the London Times.

== Terminology ==
In advance of Glastonbury 2004, the Sunday Times coined the term "festival chic", for a style with some similarities to boho. It subsequently labelled a photographic spread of Sienna Miller, Lauren Bailey, Erin O'Connor and other muses of Matthew Williamson as "boho babes", advised its readers to "think art-school chic" by adopting layers of clashing colours and, in 2006, noted that "last year's boho babe" had become "this year's boho-rock chick".

Almost an extension of "festival chic", the Telegraph coined the term "foho" to describe the evolution of the boho style in the summer of 2007. According to the newspaper, this look, which took its influence from both boho style and "the heavy influence of folk culture", had been seen on the likes of Sienna Miller and Kate Moss.

The London Evening Standard referred to "hippie chic" (a term used in the 1990s with reference to the velvet kaftans created by Tom Ford for the Italian house of Gucci) in a feature about "gypsy queens", while the Sunday Times, reflecting on what "the fashion world called ... boho chic", referred to Sienna Miller's having created "the retro hippie look that swept Britain's high streets". In 2007 London Lite hailed the return of "hippy, hippy chic" and, as noted, Fashion Union marketed "hippie chic" tops in 2010.

"Boho-by-default" was an unflattering description used by Lisa Armstrong to describe the style of women ("gargoyles" as opposed to "summer goddesses") who, for summer wear, "drag the same greying, crumpled boho-by-default mess out of storage every year".

=== Morocco and Talitha Getty ===
In 2006, the Sunday Times described the Moroccan resort and seaport of Essaouira as the "boho/barefoot-chic beach" because of its association with fashionable "Euro aesthetes with their Talitha Getty-esque kaftans". The latter was a reference to an iconic photograph of Talitha Pol, wife of John Paul Getty, that was taken by Patrick Lichfield in Marrakesh in 1969. This image was described by Lisa Armstrong as "typif[ying] the luxe bohemian look". Anticipating Glastonbury 2005, Hedley Freeman in the Guardian had recommended the wearing of headscarves to achieve "Talitha Getty chic".

== Related trends ==
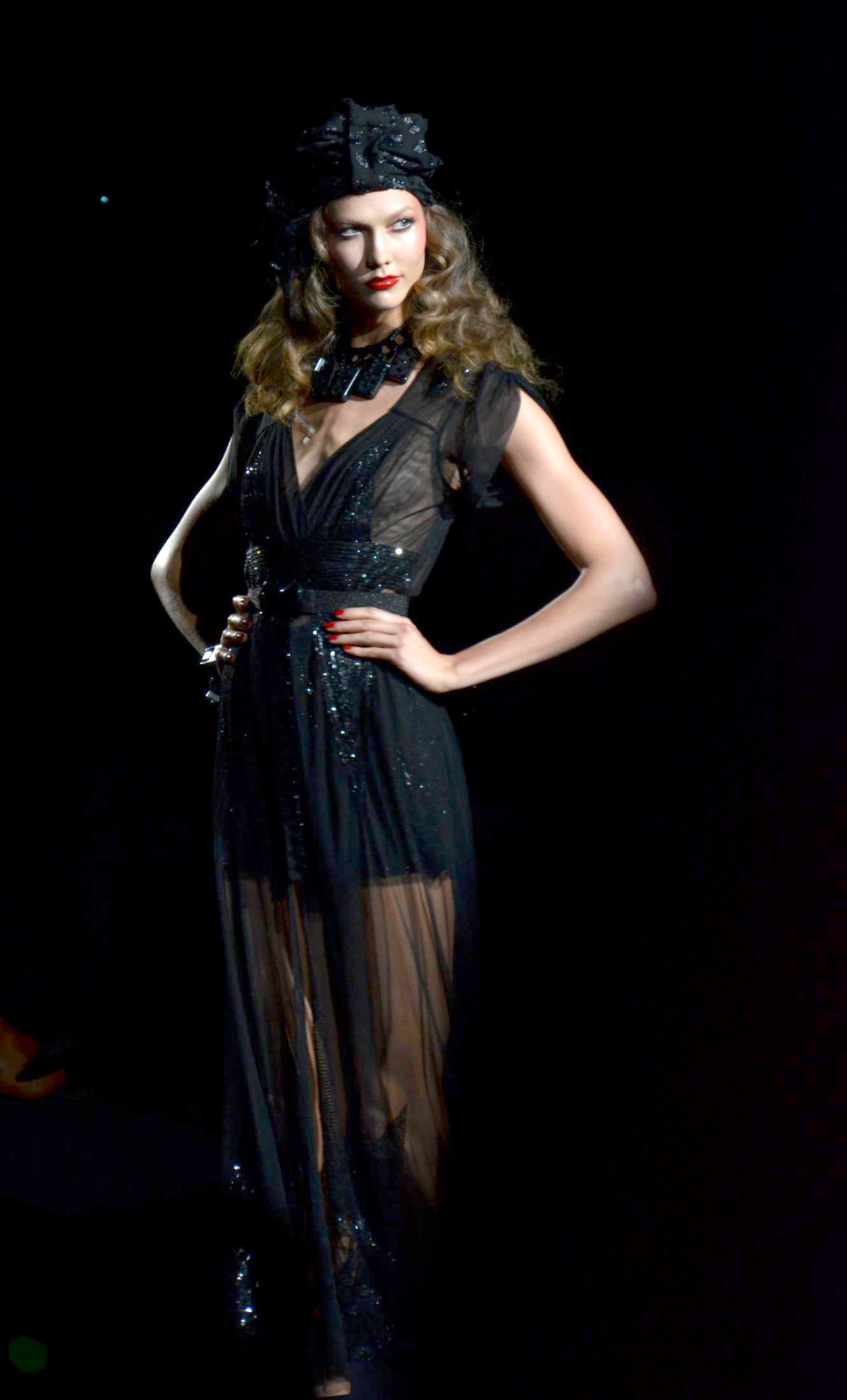
Karlie Kloss poses on the runway at the Anna Sui show in September 2011.

=== Olsen twins and American bobo ===
In the United States, Mary-Kate and Ashley Olsen, especially the former, were credited with a "homeless" look, first identified as such in Greenwich Village, New York in late 2004, that had many "boho" features (large sunglasses, flowing skirts, boots and loose jumpers). This was sometimes referred to as "ashcan chic". The term, "bobo chic" (also known as "hobo-grunge", "heroin chic" or "luxe grunge"), had similar connotations, "bobo" (or "BoBo") being a contraction of "bourgeois" and "bohemian" coined by New York Times columnist David Brooks in his book, Bobos in Paradise (2000).

Bobo chic was associated in particular with punks in the SoHo area of Lower Manhattan, to the south of Greenwich Village. It was described by a student fashion writer as "paying to look poor" and having been "made popular by silver screen stars who all look like they got dressed in the dark like the Olsen twins, Kirsten Dunst and Chloë Sevigny". In 2008 English actress Sophie Winkleman, who had attended Cambridge University in the 1990s, remarked wryly that she had "wor[n] floaty dresses at university ... thinking that I looked poetic and wistful. I actually looked homeless". Another British commentator referred to Mary-Kate Olsen's "everything-but-the-kitchen-sink approach to dressing", but noted that, by 2006, the Olsens' merchandising empire was recording annual sales of £500 million.

==== Cocktail grunge and the catwalk ====
A "catwalk", a refinement in 2006, of which actresses Kate Bosworth and Thandie Newton were said to be exponents, was referred to as "cocktail grunge" – "looking done-undone ... it's what Marianne Faithfull and Blondie would be wearing if they were young now". – while a journalist who interviewed supermodel Helena Christensen in 2011 observed that, fresh from a photoshoot, she "flopped in a leather armchair like a sexy, ageing beatnik" and that, while "not a hippie, exactly", she lived in "groovy bohemia in Manhattan, where you can spot [her] moseying around the flea markets on the weekends". At the end of the 2000s (decade), this combination of apparently conflicting features was adopted by teenaged actress Taylor Momsen, who, in 2010, became the "face" of the British retailing chain New Look. Momsen described her style as "sweet and tough, grunge meets Chanel – a giant oxymoron" and claimed that she chose her outfits from "whatever clean clothes she finds on her floor" ("although no one ever believes me").

=== French bobos and similar stylists ===
In the world of Parisian fashion, the term bobo (short for Bourgeois Bohème), which also had political connotations, was applied to "typically discerning customers who are left wing and Left Bank"; or, put another way, "that subset of thirty- or forty-something-year-olds who don't allow their socialist leanings to interfere with an enjoyment of material pleasures". As such, la gauche caviar [the caviar left] was sometimes applied as an epithet to bobos.

The bobo style of dress has been described as "retro-hippie-shabby-chic", its elements including jersey tops, boiled wool jackets, smart jeans, Converse training shoes and leather bags by Jerome Dreyfuss (born 1974). A leading exponent was actress and singer Vanessa Paradis, who particularly favoured the designs of Isabel Marant (born 1967), while English actress Michelle Dockery, best known for her part as Lady Mary Crawley in the early 20th century drama Downton Abbey (2010–14), cited Anglo-French actress Charlotte Gainsbourg as one of her style icons: "I love that she looks like she's just thrown it on. Simplicity is true elegance". Around the same time, another British actress Karen Gillan, best known as Amy Pond in the BBC's science-fiction series Doctor Who, defined the look of 1960s model Jean Shrimpton, whom she greatly admired and had just portrayed in a filmed drama for television, as "messy, waifish, bony". She herself professed a liking for vintage clothing:

"When girls do the walk of shame ... I think they look best like that, slightly dishevelled." The Kate Moss look? "Yeah".

Some of the teenaged rock bands, such as Second Sex and the Plastiscines, that emerged in France c. 2006 and were known collectively as les bébés rockers ("baby rockers"), were initially derided in some sections of the press because of their bobo backgrounds: as Kate Spicer observed in the Sunday Times, "it's as if a bunch of privileged Islington kids had picked up their guitars and proclaimed themselves the new Sex Pistols". By 2010 bobos – "free-thinkers at the weekend, but bankers Monday to Friday" – were said to be squeezing out young, genuinely creative Parisians from their traditional neighborhoods, with Porte de Bagnolet, in the 20th arrondissement, cited as an alternative base for "the next generation of diverse Parisian voices".

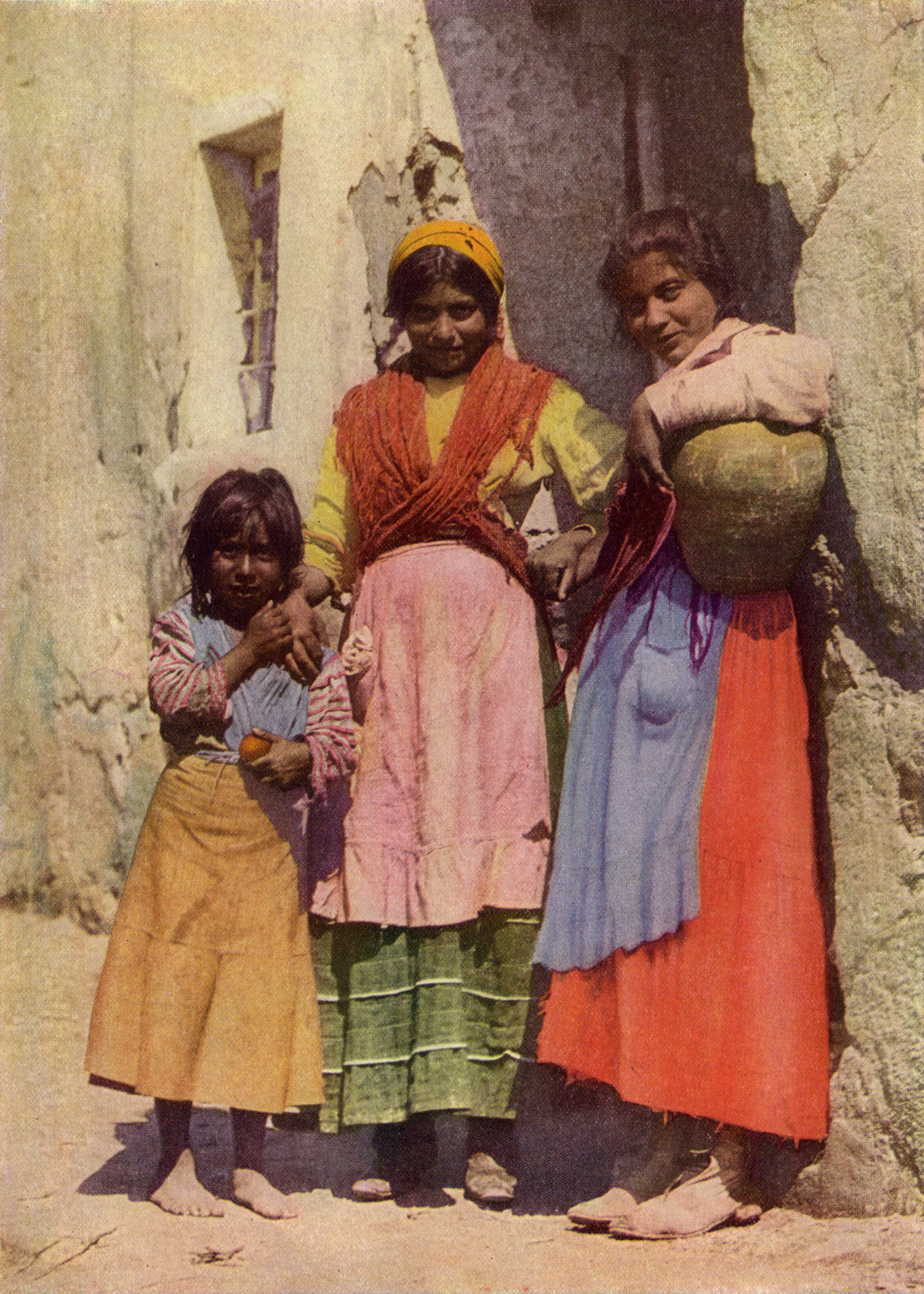
Spanish Gypsies, 1917 (National Geographic)

The name "Bourgeois Boheme" was adopted in 2005 by a British company, founded by Alicia Lai, that marketed "ethnically sourced" fashion accessories and cosmetics and, by 2009, had moved into handmade shoes crafted from such materials as hemp and organic cotton.

The European fashion style Lagenlook, which is an unadapted borrowing loanword from German meaning "layered look," is considered a Bohemian style.

== Bohemian roots ==
Although boho-chic in the early years of the 21st century represented a definite style, it was not a "movement." Nor was it noticeably associated with bohemianism as such. Jessica Brinton saw it as "the tagging and selling of the bohemian dream to the masses for £5.99". Indeed, the Sunday Times thought it ironic that "fashionable girls wore ruffly floral skirts in the hope of looking bohemian, nomadic, spirited and non-bourgeois", whereas "gypsy girls themselves ... are sexy and delightful precisely because they do not give a hoot for fashion". By contrast, in the first half of the 20th century, aspects of bohemian fashion were a reflection of the lifestyle itself.

In fact, most of the components of boho had, in one way or another, drifted in and out of fashion since the "Summer of Love" of 1967 when hippiedom and psychedelia were at their peak. As journalist Bob Stanley put it, "the late 1960s are never entirely out of fashion, they just need a fresh angle to make them de jour".
