= Metria Innovation =

Metria Innovation was founded in 2008 to commercialize Moiré Phase Tracking (MPT) technology that uses a single camera for motion capture. Metria is based in Wauwatosa, Wisconsin.

The underlying research that developed the Moiré Phase Tracking was funded privately and through grants from the National Institutes of Health through a Small Business Innovation Research (SBIR) grant.

Metria's MPT technology provides 3D measurements using a single camera with highly-engineered specific markers. Each marker provides data for position (X, Y, and Z) and orientation (Pitch, Yaw, and Roll) and has up to 30 times better accuracy than comparable multi-camera systems. Using the MPT system, the single camera can detect and track the unique markers. The camera then will measure the movement using the moiré patterns on the markers.

Metria's MoCap software turns the moiré patterns' motion into position and orientation data. This data can then be used in 3D animation software, ergonomics programs, or any other application that requires 3D motion data.

The team is led by Brian Armstrong, professor of electrical engineering at UWM - Bachelors of Science degrees in Physics and Mechanical Engineering from MIT, and a Ph.D. in Electrical Engineering (Robotics) from Stanford.
