= Shape moiré =

Type of moiré patterns

Shape moiré is one type of moiré patterns demonstrating the phenomenon of moiré magnification. 1D shape moiré is the particular simplified case of 2D shape moiré. One-dimensional patterns may appear when superimposing an opaque layer containing tiny horizontal transparent lines on top of a layer containing a complex shape which is periodically repeating along the vertical axis.

== Description ==
Shape moiré is sometimes referred as band moiré. The opaque layer with transparent lines is called the revealing layer. The layer containing the periodically repeating shapes is called the base layer. The period of shapes in the base layer is denoted as p_{b}. The period of transparent lines in the revealing layer is denoted as p_{r}. The periods of both layers must be sufficiently close. The superimposition image reveals the shapes of the base layer stretched along the vertical axis. The magnified shapes appear periodically along the vertical axis. The dimensions along the horizontal axis are not changed. If the complex shape of the base layer is a sequence of symbols (e.g. a horizontal text) compressed along the vertical axis, then the superimposition of the revealing layer can restore the original proportions of these symbols. The size along the vertical axis, p_{m}, of the magnified optical shape is expressed by the following formula:
$$p_m=-\frac{p_b \cdot p_r}{p_b-p_r}$$
Negative values of p_{m} signify mirrored appearance (the magnified shapes will be inverted along the vertical axis) of the stretched shapes.

When the revealing layer is moved along the vertical axis, the magnified shapes move along the vertical axis at a faster speed. The speedup factor is expressed by the following formula:
$$\frac{v_m}{v_r}=-\frac{p_b}{p_b-p_r}$$
Negative values of v_{m} / v_{r} signify the movement of optical shapes in reverse direction.

== Examples ==
When p_{r} > p_{b}, the magnified shapes appear normally, but they move in reverse direction compared to the movement of the revealing layer. See the figure below:

When p_{r} < p_{b}, the magnified shapes appear inverted along the vertical axis, but they move in the same direction as the revealing layer. See the figure below:

== Line moiré ==
Line moiré can be considered as a particular case of shape moiré when the shape embedded in the base layer is simply a straight or curved line.
