= Moir =

Moir or MOIR may refer to:

- Moir (surname), a surname of Scottish origin, and is part of the Clan Gordon of the Scottish Highlands
- Moir Tod Stormonth Darling, Lord Stormonth-Darling (1844–1912), Scottish politician and judge
- Moir Lockhead (born 1945), English businessman
- Moir Leslie, a character in the BBC radio sitcom Flying the Flag
- Revolutionary Independent Labour Movement (Movimiento Obrero Independiente y Revolucionario or MOIR), a left-wing party in Colombia
- Moir baronets, two titles, one in the Baronetage of Nova Scotia and one in the Baronetage of the United Kingdom
- Moir Gardens, botanical gardens in Hawaii
- Mount Moir, a mountain in New Zealand

== See also ==
- Moire (disambiguation)
