= Layered clothing =

Way of dressing

Layered clothing is the wearing of multiple garments on top of each other for warmth or for style.

== Layers ==
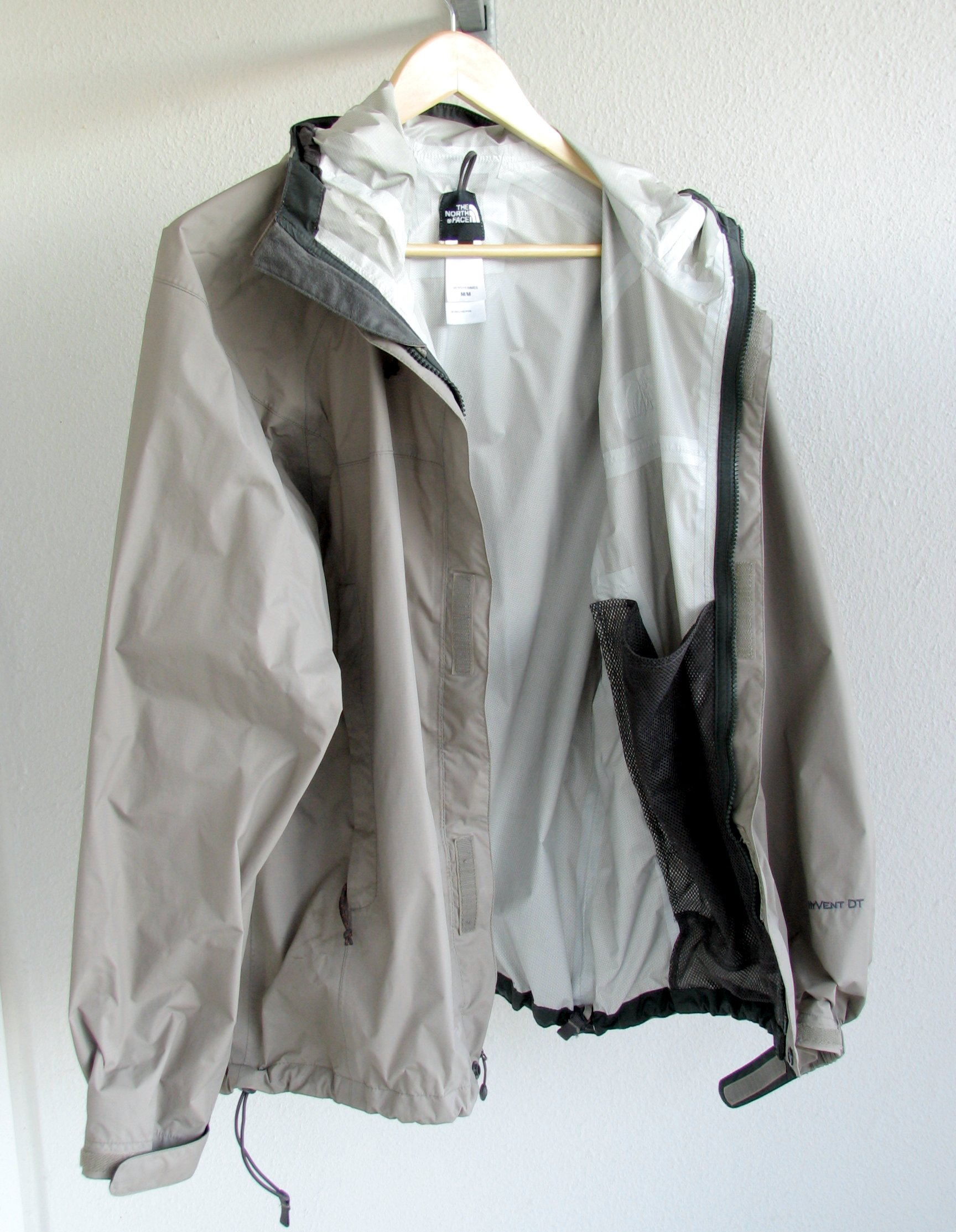
A waterproof, breathable (hard shell) jacket

Often, clothing combines two adjacent layers, as in the case of warm undergarments that provide both comfort and insulation. Layered clothing usually consists of three layers. They are identified as follows:

- The inner layer provides comfort by keeping the skin dry. Also called base layer or first layer. The purpose of the inner layer is to draw sweat away from the skin to the outer layers to make them feel warmer. If a piece of clothing does not transfer moisture well, it is not strictly an inner layer garment but simply a mid-layer garment. Wool has a combination of wicking and water-repelling properties. and is highly odour-resistant.
- The mid layer or insulating layer provides additional insulation. Mid layer materials includes wool, which provides insulation and has the capacity to absorb moisture. Synthetic fiberfill, such as polyester fiber, is used similarly to down.
- The outer layer or shell layer protects the other two layers from wind and/or water. Both "soft" and "hard" shell jackets and layers exist. Hard shells are commonly woven fabrics and do not rip. Examples of a shell layer include plastic raincoats and water-repellent coatings. Before waterproof-breathable shells were invented, the "60/40" (60% cotton, 40% nylon) parka was widely used. The term soft shell is used to describe garments that combine partial or full water resistance with partial or full wind-breaking ability. Soft shell fabrics can come with a wicking layer. In many cases, insulation is combined. Soft shells may rip more easily, and are not waterproof.

== Cultural dimensions ==
In fashion, combining different garments in layers can be used to create a variety of outfits. The wearer can shed layers according to changes in temperature.

In the New Testament, Jesus in Mark's Gospel counsels his apostles to "put on sandals but not to wear two tunics". Commentators find the meaning unclear, discussing whether the apostles should "not put on two coats; that is, at a time; an inner and an outward one, or one at one time, and another at another". Some translations suggest the words refer to a change of clothes; the equivalent texts in Matthew's Gospel and Luke's Gospel are generally treated as referring to extra clothes.

Layering clothing is also a historical necessity within the military.

Historically, layering garments and undergarments was much more involved and structural. For example the late 18th century and petticoats, corsets and stays.

== Layer systems ==
- Extended Cold Weather Clothing System (ECWCS)
- VKBO Layer system

== See also ==
- Waterproof fabric – Textile that resists moisture penetration
- Durable water repellent – Fabric finish
- Heated clothing – Functional clothing
- Lagenlook - Layered clothing fashion style
- Quilt
