= Line moiré =

Type of moiré pattern

Line moiré is one type of moiré pattern; a pattern that appears when superposing two transparent layers containing correlated opaque patterns. Line moiré is the case when the superposed patterns comprise straight or curved lines. When moving the layer patterns, the moiré patterns transform or move at a faster speed. This effect is called optical moiré speedup.

== Superposition of layers with periodically repeating parallel lines ==
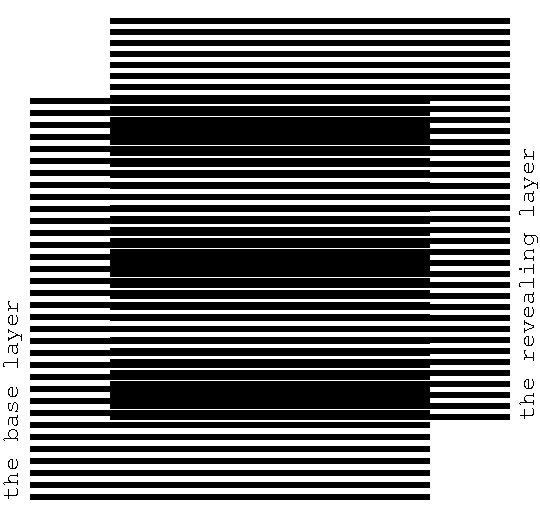
Figure 1. Two layers with parallel lines

Simple moiré patterns can be observed when superposing two transparent layers comprising periodically repeating opaque parallel lines as shown in Figure 1. The lines of one layer are parallel to the lines of the second layer.

The superposition image does not change if transparent layers with their opaque patterns are inverted. When considering printed samples, one of the layers is denoted as the base layer and the other one as the revealing layer. It is assumed that the revealing layer is printed on a transparency and is superimposed on top of the base layer, which can be printed either on a transparency or on an opaque paper. The periods of the two layer patterns are close. We denote the period of the base layer as p_{b} and the period of the revealing layer as p_{r}.

The superposition image of Figure 1 outlines periodically repeating dark parallel bands, called moiré lines. Spacing between the moiré lines is much larger than the periods of lines in the two layers.

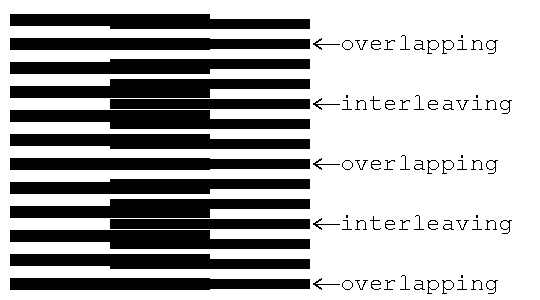
Figure 2. Overlapping and interleaving zones

Light bands of the superposition image correspond to the zones where the lines of both layers overlap. The dark bands of the superposition image forming the moiré lines correspond to the zones where the lines of the two layers interleave, hiding the white background. The labels of Figure 2 show the passages from light zones with overlapping layer lines to dark zones with interleaving layer lines. The light and dark zones are periodically interchanging.

Figure 3 shows a detailed diagram of the superposition image between two adjacent zones with overlapping lines of the revealing and base layers (i.e., between two light bands).

The period p_{m} of moiré lines is the distance from one point where the lines of both layers overlap (at the bottom of the figure) to the next such point (at the top). Let us count the layer lines, starting from the bottom point. At the count 0 the lines of both layers overlap. Since in our case p_{r}<p_{b}, for the same number of counted lines, the base layer lines with a long period advance faster than the revealing layer lines with a short period. At the halfway of the distance p_{m}, the base layer lines are ahead the revealing layer lines by a half a period (p_{r}/2) of the revealing layer lines, due to which the lines are interleaving, forming a dark moiré band. At the full distance p_{m}, the base layer lines are ahead of the revealing layer lines by a full period p_{r}, so the lines of the layers again overlap. The base layer lines gain the distance p_{m} with as many lines (p_{m}/p_{b}) as the number of the revealing layer lines (p_{m}/p_{r}) for the same distance minus one: p_{m}/p_{r} = p_{m}/p_{b} + 1. From here we obtain the well known formula for the period p_{m} of the superposition image:
$$p_m=\frac{p_b \cdot p_r}{p_b - p_r}.$$
For the case when the revealing layer period is longer than the base layer period, the distance between moiré bands is the absolute value computed by the formula. The superposition of two layers comprising parallel lines forms an optical image comprising parallel moiré lines with a magnified period. According to the formula for computing p_{m}, the closer the periods of the two layers, the stronger the magnification factor is.

The thicknesses of layer lines affect the overall darkness of the superposition image and the thickness of the moiré bands, but the period p_{m} does not depend on the layer lines’ thickness.

== Speedup of movements with moiré ==
The moiré bands of Figure 1 will move if we displace the revealing layer. When the revealing layer moves perpendicularly to layer lines, the moiré bands move along the same axis, but several times faster than the movement of the revealing layer.

Figure 4. Slow movement of the revealing layer upward

The GIF animation shown in Figure 4 corresponds to a slow movement of the revealing layer. The GIF file repeatedly animates an upward movement of the revealing layer (perpendicular to layer lines) across a distance equal to p_{r}. The animation demonstrates that the moiré lines of the superposition image move up at a speed, much faster than the movement speed of the revealing layer.

When the revealing layer is shifted up perpendicularly to the layer lines by one full period (p_{r}) of its pattern, the superposition optical image must be the same as the initial one. It means that the moiré lines traverse a distance equal to the period of the superposition image p_{m} while the revealing layer traverses the distance equal to its period p_{r}. Assuming that the base layer is immobile (v_{b}=0), the following equation represents the ratio of the optical speed to the revealing layer’s speed:
$$\frac{v_m}{v_r}=\frac{p_m}{p_r}.$$
By replacing p_{m} with its formula, we have
$$\frac{v_m}{v_r}=\frac{p_b}{p_b-p_r}.$$
In case the period of the revealing layer is longer than the period of the base layer, the optical image moves in the opposite direction. The negative value of the ratio computed according to this formula signifies a movement in the reverse direction.

== Superposition of layers with inclined lines ==
Here we present patterns with inclined lines. When we are interested in optical speedup we can represent the case of inclined patterns such that the formulas for computing moiré periods and optical speedups remain valid in their current simplest form. For this purpose, the values of periods p_{r}, p_{b}, and p_{m} correspond to the distances between the lines along the axis of movements (the vertical axis in the animated example of Figure 4). When the layer lines are perpendicular to the movement axis, the periods (p) are equal to the distances (denoted as T) between the lines (as in Figure 4). If the lines are inclined, the periods (p) along the axis of the movement are not equal to the distances (T) between the lines.

=== Computing moiré lines’ inclination as function of the inclination of layers’ lines ===
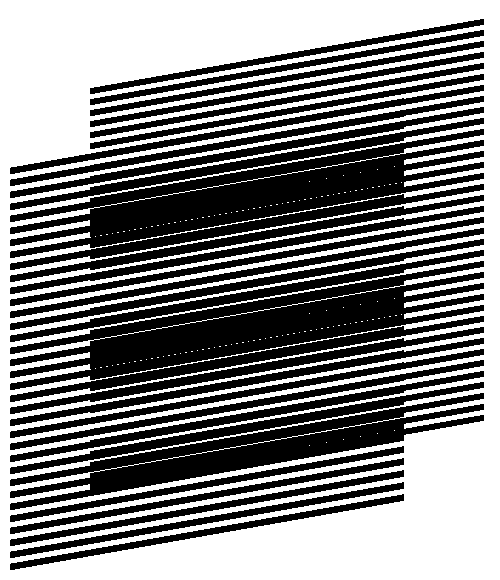
Figure 5. Identical inclination of layer lines

The superposition of two layers with identically inclined lines forms moiré lines inclined at the same angle. Figure 5 is obtained from Figure 1 with a vertical shearing. In Figure 5 the layer lines and the moiré lines are inclined by 10 degrees. Since the inclination is not a rotation, during the inclination the distance (p) between the layer lines along the vertical axis is conserved, but the true distance (T) between the lines (along an axis perpendicular to these lines) is changed. The difference between the vertical periods p_{b}, p_{r}, and the distances T_{b}, T_{r} is shown in the diagram of Figure 8.

The inclination degree of layer lines may change along the horizontal axis forming curves. The superposition of two layers with identical inclination pattern forms moiré curves with the same inclination pattern. In Figure 6 the inclination degree of layer lines gradually changes according to the following sequence of degrees (+30, –30, +30, –30, +30). Layer periods p_{b} and p_{r} represent the distances between the curves along the vertical axis. The presented formulas for computing the period p_{m} (the vertical distance between the moiré curves) and the optical speedup (along the vertical axis) are valid for Figure 6.

More interesting is the case when the inclination degrees of layer lines are not the same for the base and revealing layers. Figure 7 shows an animation of a superposition images where the inclination degree of base layer lines is constant (10 degrees), but the inclination of the revealing layer lines oscillates between 5 and 15 degrees. The periods of layers along the vertical axis p_{b} and p_{r} are the same all the time. Correspondingly, the period p_{m} (along the vertical axis) computed with the basic formula also remains the same.

Figure 8 helps to compute the inclination degree of moiré optical lines as a function of the inclination of the revealing and the base layer lines. We draw the layer lines schematically without showing their true thicknesses. The bold lines of the diagram inclined by α_{b} degrees are the base layer lines. The bold lines inclined by α_{r} degrees are the revealing layer lines. The base layer lines are vertically spaced by a distance equal to p_{b}, and the revealing layer lines are vertically spaced by a distance equal to p_{r}. The distances T_{b} and T_{r} represent the true space between the base layer and revealing layer lines, correspondingly. The intersections of the lines of the base and the revealing layers (marked in the figure by two arrows) lie on a central axis of a light moiré band. The dashed line of Figure 8 corresponds to the axis of the light moiré band. The inclination degree of moiré lines is therefore the inclination α_{m} of the dashed line.

From Figure 8 we deduce the following two equations:
$$\begin{cases}
\tan \alpha_m=\frac{p_b+l \cdot \tan\alpha_b}{l} \\
\tan \alpha_r=\frac{p_b-p_r+l \cdot \tan\alpha_b}{l}
\end{cases}$$
From these equations we deduce the equation for computing the inclination of moiré lines as a function of the inclinations of the base layer and the revealing layer lines:
$$\tan\alpha_m=\frac{p_b \cdot \tan\alpha_r - p_r \cdot \tan\alpha_b}{p_b-p_r}$$

=== Deducing other known formulas ===
The true pattern periods T_{b}, T_{r}, and T_{m} (along the axes perpendicular to pattern lines) are computed as follows (see Figure 8):
$$T_b=p_b \cdot \cos\alpha_b,\ T_r=p_r \cdot\cos\alpha_r,\ T_m=p_m \cdot\cos\alpha_m$$
From here, using the formula for computing tan(α_{m}) with periods p, we deduce a well known formula for computing the moiré angle α_{m} with periods T:
$$\alpha_m=\arctan\left(\frac{T_b\cdot\sin\alpha_r-T_r\cdot\sin\alpha_b}{T_b \cdot\cos\alpha_r-T_r\cdot\cos\alpha_b}\right)$$
From formula for computing p_{m} we deduce another well known formula for computing the period T_{m} of moiré pattern (along the axis perpendicular to moiré bands):
$$T_m=\frac{T_b \cdot T_r}{\sqrt{T_b^2+T_r^2-2 \cdot T_b \cdot T_r \cdot \cos(\alpha_r-\alpha_b)}}$$
In the particular case when T_{b}=T_{r}=T, the formula for the period T_{m} is reduced into well known formula:
$$T_m=\frac{T}{2 \cdot \sin \left ( \frac{\alpha_r-\alpha_b}{2} \right )}$$
And the formula for computing α_{m} is reduced to:
$$\alpha_m=90^\circ +\frac{\alpha_r+\alpha_b}{2}$$

=== The revealing lines inclination as a function of the superposition image’s lines inclination ===
Here is the equation for computing the revealing layer line inclination α_{r} for a given base layer line inclination α_{b}, and a desired moiré line inclination α_{m}:
$$\tan\alpha_r=\frac{p_r}{p_b} \cdot \tan\alpha_b+\left(1-\frac{p_r}{p_b}\right)\cdot \tan\alpha_m.$$

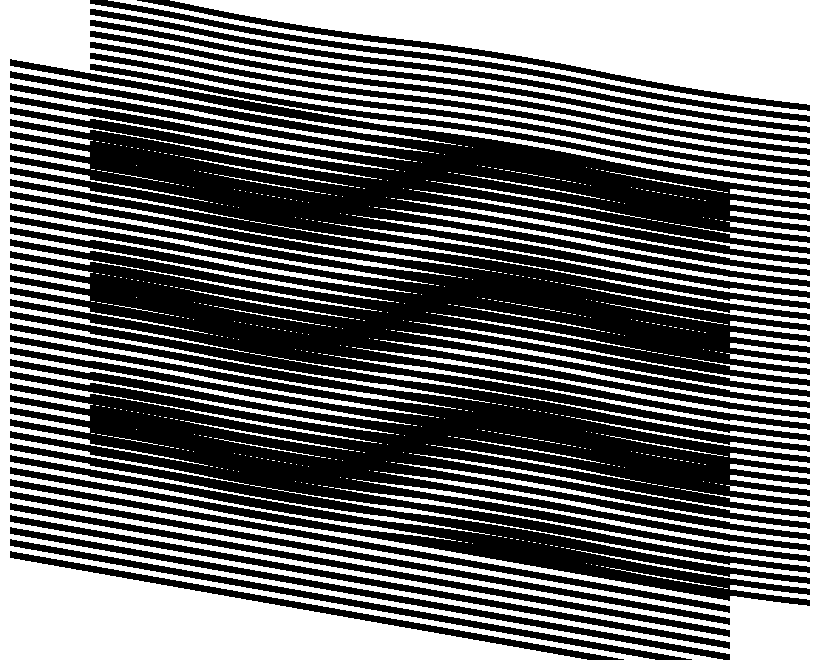
Figure 9. Moiré curves with straight base layer lines

For any given base layer line inclination, this equation permits us to obtain a desired moiré line inclination by properly choosing the revealing layer inclination. In Figure 6 we showed an example where the curves of layers follow an identical inclination pattern forming a superposition image with the same inclination pattern. The inclination degrees of the layers’ and moiré lines change along the horizontal axis according to the following sequence of alternating degree values (+30, –30, +30, –30, +30). In Figure 9 we obtain the same superposition pattern as in Figure 6, but with a base layer comprising straight lines inclined by –10 degrees. The revealing pattern of Figure 9 is computed by interpolating the curves into connected straight lines, where for each position along the horizontal axis, the revealing line’s inclination angle α_{r} is computed as a function of α_{b} and α_{m} according to the equation above.

Figure 9 demonstrates that the difference between the inclination angles of revealing and base layer lines has to be several times smaller than the difference between inclination angles of moiré and base layer lines.

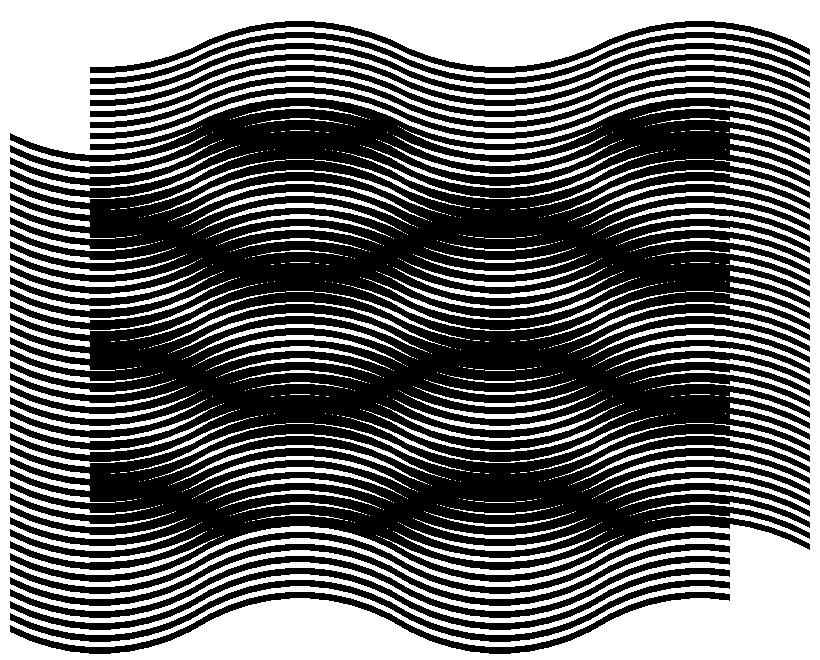
Figure 10. Inversed base layer and moiré lines

Another example forming the same superposition patterns as in Figure 6 and Figure 9 is shown in Figure 10. In Figure 10 the desired inclination pattern (+30, –30, +30, –30, +30) is obtained using a base layer with an inverted inclination pattern (–30, +30, –30, +30, –30).

Figure 11. The same moiré curves with modifying layer patterns

Effect on circular lines.

Figure 11 shows an animation where we obtain a superposition image with a constant inclination pattern of moiré lines (+30, –30, +30, –30, +30) for continuously modifying pairs of base and revealing layers. The base layer inclination pattern gradually changes and the revealing layer inclination pattern correspondingly adapts such that the superposition image’s inclination pattern remains the same.
