= Battle of Ovaro =

1945 battle in the Italian Campaign

- Part of Italian campaign (World War II), War crimes in World War II and World War II
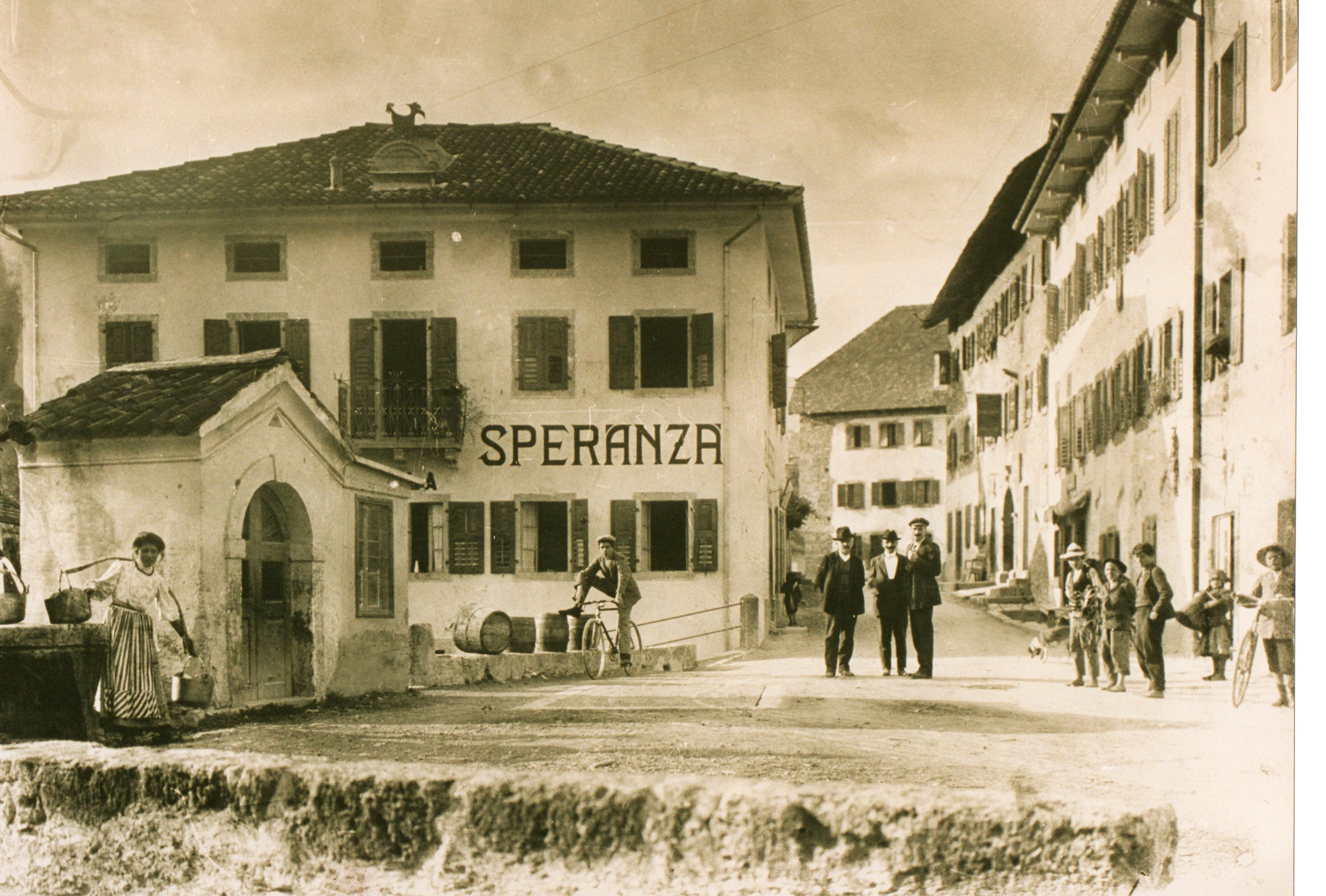
- A photo of Ovaro in the 1920s, as to show the city center at the time in the 40s
Date	1 May 1945 – 3 May 1945 (3 days)
Location	Ovaro, Carnia, Italy
Result	See § Aftermath
Territorial changes	The end of the Kosakenland in Nord Italien

Belligerents
Germany: Kazachi Stan; ( Kosakenland)	Italian resistance movement: Stalin Battalion; Brigate Garibaldi; Canin Battalion; Brigate Osoppo

Commanders and leaders
Pyotr Krasnov; Timofey Domanov; Sultan Klych-Girey; Andrei Shkuro	Elio Martinis

Units involved
~16,000	670 in the Stalin regiment

Casualties and losses
Numerous Cossack soldiers 42 dead civilians and 26 injured civilians	152 dead civilians in Ovaro, Avasinis and Gemona del Friuli; 2–12 Georgian partisans At least 3 Italian partisans

The Battle of Ovaro was a battle between the Kazachi Stan, the Nazi-backed Cossack collaborators who had settled in Northern Friuli and created the puppet entity of Kosakenland, and the Italian partisans on 1 May 1945, in Ovaro, with its culmination being on 2 May 1945. The battle brought to the end of "Kosakenland in Nord Italien" and the start of the Cossack retreat towards Austria.

== Background ==
=== Operation Ataman ===
During the summer of 1944, Northern Friuli became a major center of partisan activity, culminating in the proclamation of the Republic of Carnia on 26 September. In response, Higher SS and Police leader Odilo Globocnik, based in Trieste, initiated Operation Ataman, which brought in the Kazachi Stan mobile encampment of Cossack collaborators. They included about 22,000 Cossack troops and families and 4,000 Caucasians to the region using around fifty military trains. After suppressing the partisan republic, the Cossacks established the so-called "Kosakenland in Norditalien", a puppet territory sponsored by the Nazi Germany, complete with their own institutions, religion, and lifestyle. Verzegnis became the headquarters of their supreme commander Pyotr Krasnov, and several local towns were renamed after Russian cities, while Tolmezzo hosting the Cossack's autonomous council. The area was divided between Cossack and Caucasian settlements, the latter under Sultan Klych-Girey. Some Cossacks and Caucasians defected to the Italian Resistance, forming the so-called Stalin Battalion.

== Battle ==
The Canin Battalion, part of the wider Brigate Garibaldi partisan unit, entered the cities of Chialina and Ovaro at 16:00 CET, 1 May 1945. The Battalion demanded that the Cossacks lay down their arms, but was met with small arms fire and grenades at around 21:00 CET. The battalion retreated to Chialina in order to reorganize. A night of planning followed, during which various partisan-aligned Georgian units started to mobilize from Comeglians towards Clavais and Barc in order to join with the partisans. The total number of Georgian troops is estimated to be around 670 troops, with Princess Miriam and Giorgio Lolua leading 600 and 70 troops respectively.

In the first hours of 2 May 1945, it was decided by partisan commander Alessandro Foi that an explosive had to be put in the proximity of Ovaro's barrack, occupied at the time by the Cossacks. Soon after that, the plan was pursued by the Georgian partisans who blew up the barrack where numerous of the Cossacks' wives and children were hiding, killing 42 of them and injuring 26. The attack by the partisans, including the Brigate Garibaldi, the Osoppo Brigade and the Stalin Battalion (the Georgians) had begun. On that day, the Cossacks had already decided to retreat from the town with their families and head towards Austria. However, despite being taken by surprise by the partisan assault, they reacted with fire and even repelled the attacks.

Upon getting news of incoming reinforcement and experiencing significant losses, including Georgian commander Akaki Uruschadse, the partisans retreated. The Cossacks then pursued reprisal on the local population before retreating, killing up to 89 civilians (including Gemona del Friuli) and setting the town on fire. In response to the attack, other reprisals took place in nearby communities still occupied by the Cossacks, such as Avasinis, where up to 63 additional civilians were killed. By the start of the next day, the Cossacks had left.

== Aftermath ==
On 3 May 1945, the CLN in Tolmezzo tried to intimidate the Cossacks to surrender by using small military standoffs and political pressure. However, the Cossacks stated they would only surrender to an Anglo-American military commander as they headed towards the border crossing with Austria, with the partisans unable to stop them.

The population in the affected areas was divided. Some of them wanted harsh consequences on the Cossacks, whilst some assumed an apologetic attitude towards them, stating that the ones at fault were the partisans due to their attack on the barrack where Cossack civilians were located.

With the Allied offensive in Italy advancing, the Cossacks of Carnia withdrew to the Plöcken Pass and then to Austria, where on 9 May 1945, they surrendered to British troops in Lienz. Most of them were forcibly repatriated to the Soviet Union The Cossack leadership was put on trial and executed; the fighting force was sentenced to the Gulag and "special settlements".
