= Kosakenland =

Territory in north-eastern Italy, 1944–1945

Kosakenland in Norditalien Cossackia
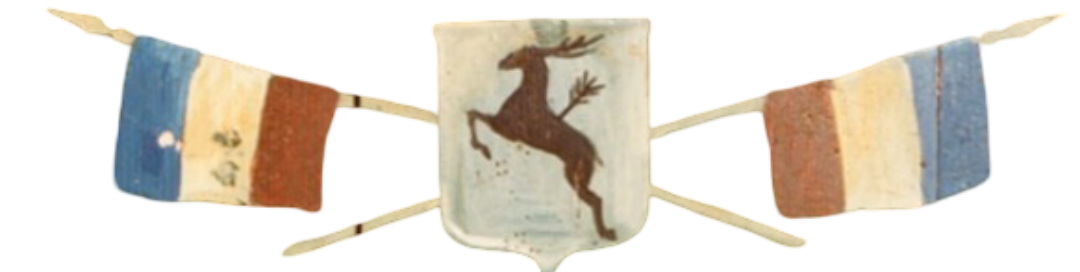
- The emblem of a stanitsa, an entity in Kosakenland with a mixed military and civilian government, with two small flags symbolizing the dual division of Kosakenland (The flag in the emblem is shown on the right)

- Territory controled by Kosakenland during its existence
- Status: Military government
- Capital: Tolmezzo
- Recognised national languages: Russian, Italian and Friulian
- Ethnic groups: Cossacks, Caucasian peoples, Turkmen, Italian and Friulians
- Religion: Catholicism, Eastern Orthodox Church and Islam

Government
  - Leader of the Cossacks: Timofey Domanov, Kazachi Stan (July 1944 - February 1945); Pyotr Krasnov, Main Administration of Cossack Forces (February 1945 - May 1945)
  - Leader of the Caucasians: Sultan Klych-Girey
- History
  - Established: July 1944
  - Dissolved: May 1945
- Currency: Italian lira
- Time zone: CET
- Today part of: Italian Republic

Kosakenland (also known as Kosakenland in Norditalien or Cossackia) was a semi-independent military government subordinate to the Nazi Operational Zone of the Adriatic Littoral established on the basis of Kazachi Stan, a mobile encampment and a combat formation composed of Cossacks who collaborated with Nazi Germany during World War II. The political entity had dual leadership representing the Circassian population and the Cossack population which had been settled by the order of Odilo Globocnik in Carnia, Friuli, Italy. The entity lasted from July 1944 to May 1945, when the Cossacks and Caucasians that had settled within it retreated to Austria in order to surrender to the British forces.

== Background ==
=== The Keitel-Rosenberg edict ===
During the German invasion of the USSR, the German armed forces, alongside the Italian ones, incorporated within their armies thousands of Cossacks who collaborated with Nazi Germany. They served in the Wehrmacht, the Waffen-SS, and the Royal Italian Army. A significant portion of these belonged to the Kazachi Stan, a mobile encampment and a combat formation composed of Cossacks who retreated with the Germans from North Caucusus and South Russia in the winter of 1942 and 1943. On 10 November 1943, when the USSR had already liberated significant portions of the country, an edict by the minister of the occupied territories, Alfred Rosenberg, and the commander of the Wehrmacht Wilhelm Keitel, assured the Kazachi Stan that, once the USSR was defeated, they would have been provided significant autonomy in their native territories, and, temporarily, in other parts of Europe if at any given time it was impossible for them to return to their native lands.

=== The grounds for establishment ===
After the Armistice of Cassibile became effective on 8 September 1943, the Germans successfully pursued Operation Wolkenbruch, securing most of Friuli-Venezia-Giulia and the Italian occupied territories of Slovenia. The Germans would subsequently establish the Operational Zone of the Adriatic Littoral, which they planned, for the most part, to incorporate in the Third Reich (incorporating it in a concept of a German-ruled "Greater Austria") following the end of World War II.

Due to this occupation, throughout the whole summer of 1944, the area of Northern Friuli was the protagonist of numerous partisan operations, which culminated on 26 September 1944 with the establishment of the Republic of Carnia. This was around the time the Cossacks units of Kazachi Stan arrived in Friuli.

In order to further undermine partisan activities, in July 1944, the SS and Police leader which was assigned to Trieste by Nazi Germany, Odilo Globocnik, allowed the settlement of Cossack units loyal to Germany in the area: it was the start of Operation Ataman, which in just a few weeks, settled up to 22,000 Cossacks (Including 9,000 soldiers, 6,000 elders, 4,000 of family members and 3,000 children) and 4,000 Caucasians (2,000 soldiers and 2,000 family members, not counting the Georgians) with the use of up to 50 military trains. Amongst those defined as "Caucasians" by the authorities, there were also Turkmens.

Initially, the settlers were temporarily stationed only in the valley in the proximity of Mont Amariana, Osoppo, Gemona del Friuli, Tarcento, Artegna, Nimis and Spilimbergo.

== History ==
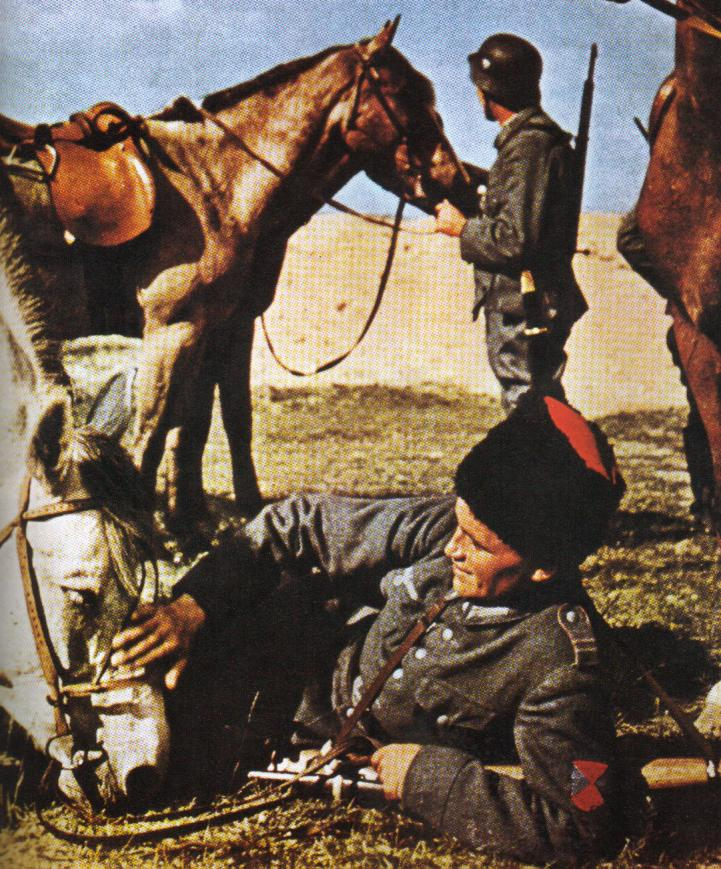
Troops of Kazachi Stan in Carnia during Operation Ataman

=== Establishment of Kosakenland and local reprisals (July 1944 - October 1944) ===
Having defeated the Republic of Carnia, the Nazi-aligned Cossacks and Caucasians started to build what they called the "Kosakenland in Norditalien," which had been promised by the Germans.

The first action by the occupiers upon having the full control of the Carnia region was a campaign of reprisal on the population due to their collaboration with the Republic of Carnia, leading to mass indiscriminate killings, rapes and occupation of civilian houses starting from August 1944 up to October 1944. One of the most infamous events during such acts of reprisals occurred on 9 October 1944, when a Catholic priest who lived in Tolmezzo, Don Giuseppe Treppo, was killed by the Cossacks after attempting to defend women and girls from being raped by them. The killing caused a diplomatic crisis between the Archdiocese of Udine and the Operational Zone of the Adriatic Litoral as well as the Cossack command. By the end of the first wave of reprisals, 62 women were sexually assaulted.

By October 1944, the Cossacks, the Caucasian and German troops had managed to solidify their control over Carnia, and the Cossacks started to deport the local Italian and Friulian population living in Alesso, Bordano, Forni Avoltri and in most areas of Trasaghis in order to settle them with Cossacks and Caucasians. The only remaining active partisan forces at the time were the Brigate Garibaldi and the 1st division of the Stalin Battalion. The Stalin Battalion was formed by Georgian settlers who had been brought to Carnia by the Germans, who, however, opposed Germany, their reprisals against the local population and the discrimination of Georgians in Kosakenland.

=== The Domanov government (November 1944 - February 1945) ===
Sultan Klych-Girey was put in charge of the areas settled by Circassians and other Caucasian ethnic groups, specifically northern Kosakenland. Whilst the southern part, settled by the Cossacks, was under the rule of Timofey Domanov who was later joined by Pyotr Krasnov, the head of the collaborationist Main Administration of Cossack Forces.

The comune of Verzegnis had become the general headquarters Krasnov, whilst other villages and towns were renamed with Russian city names (Alesso was renamed after Novočerkassk, Trasaghis was renamed after Novorossijsk, and Cavazzo to Krasnodar). Tolmezzo (Renamed "Don") had also become the headquarters of the Cossack autonomous council and the capital of the puppet state.

There was a campaign of replication of the Cossack's and the Caucasus social organizations, style of life and religious rituals within the newly settled territories. For example, the state established a national holiday to be held during Orthodox Christmas, which was only officially held once on 7 January 1945.

By the end of February 1945, mass reprisal had come to an end, and due to the need of supplies, the leaders of the Cossacks and the Caucasians decided to forcefully incite the local population to host the Cossacks and Caucasians in their houses in order to share their food and much needed supplies with them.

=== Start of the Krasnov government (15 February 1945 - 21 March 1945) ===
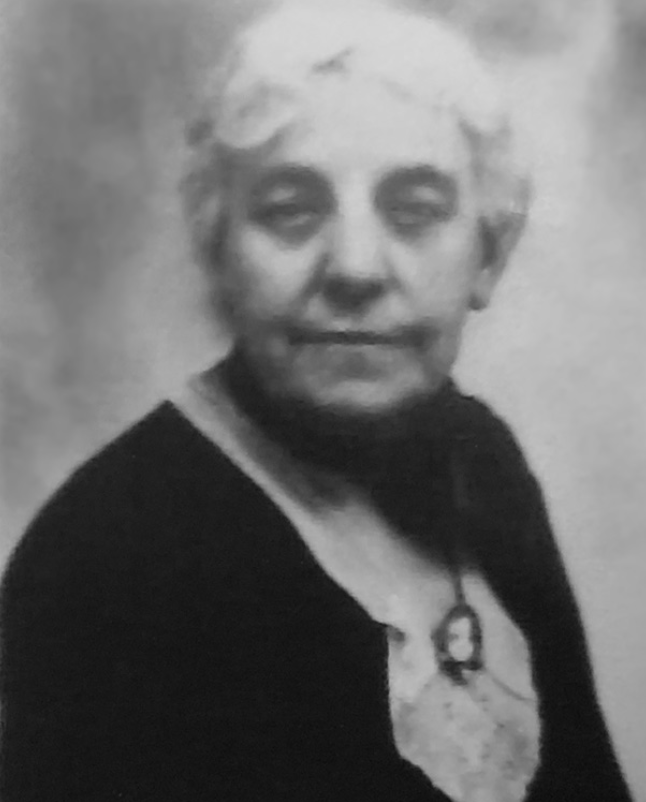
Lydia, Krasnov's wife, in 1940.

Up until 14 February 1945, Timofey Domanov was the leader of the Cossack districts in Kosakenland, however, following the arrival of Pyotr Krassnov, alongside his wife Lydia, Domanov had to give the charge of the districts to him. Krasnov lived in Carnia starting from 27 February 1945, when he and his wife stayed at the Savoy Hotel in Villa di Verzegnis, which was renovated by his orders to resemble a 19th Century Russian noble residence. Domanov had become the leader of the armed forces, whilst Krasnov handled the rest.

Krasnov's return not only decreased the level of violence towards the local population, but also increased the morale of the Cossacks which started to actively hunt for the partisans of the Brigate Garibaldi and the Stalin Battalion.

=== The Vlasov-Naumenko plot attempt (22 March 1945 - 27 March 1945) ===
When Krasnov had moved to Carnia, Vyacheslav Naumenko served as the acting director of the Main Administration of Cossack Forces in Berlin. Andrey Vlasov, chairman of the Committee for the Liberation of the Peoples of Russia, authorized by Heinrich Himmler, proposed a military takeover of the forces stationed in Carnia to repurpose them in the Committee and under Vlasvov's control. Naumenko supported the initiative and used his power as an ataman (title he had gained back in 1920) to take away Krasnov's authority over the Cossack units and under his command with a decree on 22 March 1945.

Upon hearing the news the next day, Krasnov annulled Naumenko's order transferring the Kuban troops to the ROA. He argued that Naumenko’s 1920 election as ataman was invalid because it had been conducted by only 35 members of the rada instead of the required 580, that no official records had been signed, and that Naumenko had never received a formal decree of appointment.

On 24 March 1945, he convened all senior Cossack military leaders in Tolmezzo to condemn Naumenko's actions and to confirm that the order transferring Kuban units from Domanov to Vlasov was null and void. The following day, he ordered the Cossack gendarmerie to investigate possible links between Kuban officers and Naumenko. A colonel was arrested for pro-Vlasov propaganda, and a Kuban Cossack general was removed and reassigned for the same reason. The plot came to an end when Vlasvov downplayed the event on a letter dated 27 March 1945.

=== The fall of Kosakenland (April 1945 - May 1945) ===
The Cossacks and the Caucasians started to realise that, upon the fall of the Gothic Line and the success of the Red Army in Eastern Europe, that the chances of a German victory were becoming increasingly slim. Krasnov and Vlasvov met up in Campoformido and decided to head towards Carinthia. The evacuations started on 27 April 1945, two days after the call by the CLN for the population of Carnia to rise against the Germans and the Cossacks. Atrocities against the local population significantly increased once again in this period. The partisans and the representatives of the Georgian population in Kosakenland both suggested that the Cossacks should have surrendered to the partisans, however, the Cossacks and the Caucasians both opted to continue their evacuations towards Austria and surrender to the Anglo-American forces. The Georgians soon after mostly joined the side of the Italian partisans, playing a key role in battles such as the Battle of Ovaro (one of the last battles of WW2 in Italy). What would follow would be numerous civilian casualties during the fights between the partisans and the Cossacks, resulting in 152 civilian casualties amongst Italian, Friulian and Georgian civilians and around 110 Cossack and Caucasian civilians.

On 9 May 1945, the Cossacks and Caucasians surrendered to British troops upon crossing the border into Austria, in Lienz. Most of them were repatriated to the Soviet Union, where they were sent to the Gulag and internal exile.

== Government ==
=== Southern Carnia (Cossack-controlled Carnia) ===
The area, had been divided in 54 principals (the equivalent of a primary administrative division). The districts (which functioned as secondary administrative division) were divided by the place of origin of the Cossacks. Each district had numerous "stanitsa" (third level administrative division) which were governed either by a marshal (called "Vojskvoj Staršina") or by an ataman.

There was a national hospital, a national bank called "Feldsbank" and a military tribunal that acted as a judiciary organ (which also functioned as a civic one). In most of the districts there were primary schools, and even one Cossack highschool in Chiaulis.

=== Northern Carnia (Caucasian-controlled Carnia) ===
The Caucasian controlled area had less of a strict administrative division system and focused more in dividing areas by the ethnicity of the people living in said cities. Clans and families had a prominent role. The Caucasians pretty much like the Cossacks had a military tribunal (which also functioned a civic one).

== Economy ==
=== Southern Carnia (Cossack-Controlled Carnia) ===
During their occupation of the Carnia region, the Cossack population developed an economic system which combined informal trade, subsistence agriculture, military wages, and limited wage labor. Markets were held in major cities within Carnia, where Cossacks exchanged handicrafts and abundant supplies of rock salt for forage, goods that came from other parts of Europe (mostly Eastern Europe) and Asia, and sometimes horses. Military pay introduced a significant monthly cash flow into the local economy, with an estimated 15,000 soldiers receiving on average 700 Italian lire, and thus overall producing roughly 11,5 million lire of circulating money. Cossack women also contributed to the economy through the sale of milk and products harvested from occupied fields that had been stripped from Italian and Friulian families, while groups of Cossack refugees worked seasonally in the local timber industry, transporting logs from forests to sawmills. Tolmezzo, the main command and transit center, became crowded with troops and transformed into a noisy, disorderly commercial hub where Cossack civilians operated requisitioned or rented bazaars, selling military items and religious objects. The Cossacks also began pursuing an agrarian reform of the Tagliamento river valley, planning the acquisition or requisition of farmland, surveying arable land and vineyards, and introducing improved methods of potato agriculture.

=== Northern Carnia (Caucasian-controlled Carnia) ===
The Caucasian groups stationed within Northern Carnia settled in and maintained an economic life that was largely autonomous but limited in scope. Except for dairy products and small amounts of forage, which they had managed to obtain through German supply channels coming from Austria, they relied mainly on their own resources. Commercial exchange between the Caucasians and the Cossacks as well as the other groups in Carnia was minimal and based almost entirely on barter, while the production of artisanal products was low and restricted to essential needs, such as small shoemaking and blacksmith workshops in Sutrio and Paluzza. There was also a recorded presence of a printing shop in Paluzza, which produced the biweekly newspaper Severokavkazec, but broader economic organization failed to take shape. Despite appeals from their own portion of government within Kosakenland, which kept urging the community to learn trades and cultivate artistic skills to improve living conditions in Carnia and to preserve knowledge useful for an eventual return to their homeland, the Caucasians were neither able nor willing to create more complex or collective economic structures and thus kept to themselves up until they left Carnia.

== Religion ==
In every occupied district of Carnia there were what the Cossacks called "pope". The Cossacks were mostly Orthodox. They repurposed various churches during their occupation, such as the ones located in Chiaulis di Verzegnis, Alesso, Trasaghis, Braulins, Interneppo, Mena and San Martino. The majority of the Caucasian settlers were instead Muslim. This meant they did not need to repurpose churches unlike the Cossacks, and they could instead simply transform private properties in cultural and religious sites.

The local catholic church presence deemed the occupiers as immoral and tainted. On 23 March 1945, a letter from the parish priest of Sutrio, don Giacomo Candido, to the archbishop of Udine highlighted this, adding that their "idle, overbearing and degenerat" conduct could have negatively influenced the local youth and vulnerable people within the community. Other reports directed at the orthodox clergy, rather than the soldiers or the settlers, which also moved in Carnia, show a relationship of mutual respect and curiosity with catholic institutions.

== Demographics ==
The 1941 census in Carnia identified that there were 58,549 people living within it. Assuming that the population did not dramatically change between 1942 and 1943, the population in Kosakenland at its height was only around 65,50% natives.

== Conditions of other ethnic groups ==
=== Life for the Italians and Friulians in Kosakenland ===
Despite the fact that the first wave of reprisals against the local population had come to an end around February 1945, the local Italian and Friulian population faced significant discrimination and indiscriminate physical and sexual violence on a daily basis.

Both of the populations considered each other "uncivilized", which caused tension. This was especially true in regards to their perception of private property and property rights.

The Cossacks regularly entered Italian and Friulian houses without any permit, examined the building, ordered the owners to leave as well as offering them another place to stay and, by the end of the process, settling the previous owner's house. When they decided to not kick the inhabitants, but rather settle alongside locals in their homes without their consent, according to reports to the area's prefectural commissioner, locals were subjected to scarse hygiene, scabies and harassment.

In the settlement areas, the Caucasian and Cossacks implemented a strict control of the inhabitants which involved a limitations on movement, inspections and arrests which were followed by new looting and thefts.

Multiple Italian and Friulian women and girls that were found having a relation with the Cossacks or the Caucasians had their head shaved and were humiliated amongst their peers.

=== Life for the Georgians in Kosakenland ===
The Georgian troops came from Austria and the Balkans and were around 4,800 soldiers. They were led by a Georgian princess known as "Miriam". They were part of a wider Georgian movement called "Tetri Giorgi" which had been supported by Himmler and composed of elements of the Georgian nobility that was previously located in France and also, a minority of them, were POWs from Operation Barbarossa. They mostly settled in the town of Arta Terme and lived a noble-like lifestyle, which was seen as negative by the Germans, other Caucasians and the Cossacks, who discriminated against them. The Georgians were also polyglots and thus had an easier time communicating with the local population in Carnia. This made them more liked by the locals and the Georgians also had a favourable relationship with the population of Carnia, warning them in advance whenever a reprisal was coming, hiding some of them in their homes and even telling Italian partisans whenever a search against them was coming and where to evacuate to reorganize. Most of the Georgians started to develop a favourable opinion of Joseph Stalin due to their discrimination in Carnia, and also started to idolize the Italian partisans; many would join the Stalin battalion, whilst some joined the Brigate Osoppo.

=== Stalin Battalion ===
The Stalin Battalion had two divisions, the first division which operated in Carnia, and the second one which operated in most of Friuli. Both co-operated and fought together with the CLN as early as July 1944. The battalion was made of both Georgians, Russians, Ukrainians, Poles and Cossacks. A few of the most famous members of such battalion were a Russian, Daniil Varfolomeevič Avdeev, a Ukrainian, Jaroslav Javney, and a Georgian, Pore Mosulishvili.

A few days after the end of the war, on 14 May 1945, 150 partisans of the battalion departed towards the Allied-occupied Austria where they joined the Soviet forces and were pardoned, also bringing along two willing Carnese women.

== Relations with the Italian Social Republic ==
The Italian Social Republic, whilst complacent on the surface, opposed such an initiative, and some parts of the RSI even co-operated with partisans as to undermine the existence of Kosakenland upon learning that the establishment of the military government was to become a long-term if not permanent reality.

== Legacy ==
=== Commemorations ===
==== Church of Christ the King in Timau ====
The village of Timau (comune of Paluzza) was the last settlement in Italy on the route of the retreat from Carnia toward the Plöcken Pass and the British occupation zone in Austria. In the first days of May 1945 the mixed columns of retreating German units and of the Cossack Stan passed through the village; Cossack émigré accounts describe the ten-kilometre climb that begins at Timau in rain turning to snow, with people and horses lost in the drifts along the road. The inhabitants of Timau, led by the parish priest Don Ludovico Morassi, gave Christian burial to soldiers and refugees who died during the retreat in the territory of the village.

On 2 May 1945 a high-ranking German officer of the retreating column handed Don Morassi one million lire. The donation was recorded in the parish chronicle as recompense for the services rendered by the priest and the population, including the burial of victims of the retreat; Morassi provisionally deposited the sum with the archiepiscopal curia of Udine. An assembly of the heads of families of Timau resolved unanimously to use the donation for the construction of a new church, conceived by the community as a memorial to the sufferings endured by all peoples in all wars. A tradition in the valley has also connected the money with the Cossacks themselves; Morassi, who never revealed the donor's identity before his death in 1983, maintained that the donor was a German commander and that the Cossacks were not involved in the donation.

Church of Christ the King in Timau.

Construction of the church of Christ the King (Chiesa del Cristo Re) began on 6 March 1946. The donation covered only the first phase of the works; in the early 1950s construction stalled for several years and the unfinished building deteriorated, until the works were resumed after the arrival of a new parish priest, Don Giuseppe Ceccato, in October 1957, financed by monthly parish collections and contributions obtained from public and church institutions. The church, unusually large for a small mountain village, was consecrated in January 1964, replacing the small church of Santa Geltrude; in total the construction, carried out largely through the labour and sacrifices of the villagers themselves, took eighteen years. The façade bears a mosaic of the Risen Christ executed in 1969 to a design by Ernesto Mitri, and since 1975 the church has housed one of the largest wooden crucifixes in Europe, twelve metres tall, carved by masters from Val Gardena; it has become a destination of pilgrimages.

==== Museum and commemorative events ====
The museum "La Zona Carnia nella Grande Guerra 1915–1918" in Timau, run by the Associazione Amici delle Alpi Carniche, maintains on its upper floor a permanent room dedicated to the Second World War and to the tragedy of the Cossack Army that passed through the village in the spring of 1945, with documentary material on the Cossack occupation of Carnia in 1944–1945.

An annual tradition has developed: in early June, descendants of the Cossacks of the Stan, including families living in Stuttgart, visit Timau and the museum, where an Orthodox service is celebrated, and a Cossack choir in traditional dress performs in the church of Christ the King. The museum also hosts lectures and presentations of books devoted to the Cossack period in Carnia. After crossing the Plöcken Pass in early May 1945, the Cossack Stan encamped along the Drava valley between Oberdrauburg and Lienz in Austria, where the forced repatriations of late May – June 1945 took place; the Cossack cemetery (Kosakenfriedhof) at Lienz-Peggetz, established in 1945 on the site of the Peggetz camp and marked by a memorial obelisk since 1951, received a wooden Orthodox chapel of the Protection of the Mother of God, consecrated in 2015, and remains the site of annual commemorations each June. Representatives of the Carnian communities take part in these commemorations, where victims of the 1945 forced repatriations are buried.

=== In pop culture ===
Kosakenland has been repeatedly represented in Italian literature, particularly in Friulian literature. In 1956 Bruna Sibille-Sizia released her book "La Terra Impossibile" (The Impossible Land), written from the author's direct wartime experience, the novel depicts the arrival of the Cossacks in the Torre valley and the establishment of Kosakenland. The novel was published by Doretti in 1956 and received a mention at the 1957 Premio Viareggio. Claudio Magris in his book dated 1984 named "Illazione su una sciabola" described narratively the promise of a Cossack state in Italy and the downfall of Kosakenland and its settler inhabitants. One year later, in 1985, Carlo Sgorlon published "L'armata dei fiumi perduti" (Army Of The Lost Rivers), which follows the Cossack migration into Friuli and the collapse of their promised homeland at the end of the war. It won the Strega Prize in 1985 and was subsequently translated into French as L'Armée des fleuves perdus. In 2007 Livio Isaak Sirovich released his book "La Notte delle Faville", which takes place during the time of Kosakenland in a village on the frontier of Carnia. In his 2018 dystopian and political fiction novel "Furland®", Friulian author Tullio Avoledo depicts a near-future independent Friuli that has been entirely transformed into a historical theme park. In the novel, the occupation of Carnia is commodified into an attraction called "Kosakenland '44", where actors and citizens are forced to reenact wartime clashes for wealthy tourists.
