= Tetri Giorgi (organization) =

Georgian anticommunist and nationalist émigré organization

Tetri Giorgi Georgian: ეროვნული ერთობის დარაზმულობა "თეთრი გიორგი"
- Leader: Mikheil Tsereteli
- Founders: Mikheil Tsereteli; Leo Kereselidze
- Founded: 1924
- Dissolved: 1954
- Headquarters: Paris, France
- Ideology: Fascism; National-Syndicalism; Integral Nationalism; Corporate Statism; Anti-Sovietism
- Political position: Syncretic; Third Positionist
- Slogan: საქართველო უწინარეს ყოვლისა ('Georgia Above All Else')

The Patriotic Union Tetri Giorgi (Georgian: ეროვნული ერთობის დარაზმულობა "თეთრი გიორგი" erovnuli ertobis darazmuloba "tetri giorgi") was the Georgian national political, anti-Soviet organization operating by Georgian political figures abroad. Tetri Giorgi worked in 1924-1954. The name of the organization is derived from the cult of Tetri Giorgi, one of the Georgian identities of St. George, whose equestrian image was used in the national heraldry in pre- and post-Soviet Georgia.

The political organization Tetri Giorgi was formed in 1925 by Georgian émigrés in France who had left their homeland after its forcible Sovietization in 1921. This organization, at times tilting towards right-wing nationalism, was led by General Leo Keresselidze, a World War I veteran, and Professor Mikheil (Mikhako) Tsereteli, a prominent scholar of the Middle East. Among notable members were General Shalva Maglakelidze and intellectuals such as Dr. Alexander Manvelishvili, Dr. Grigol Robakidze, Dr. Viktor Nozadze, and Dr. Kalistrate Salia. The party sought to secure European support for Georgia’s independence cause. During World War II, the organization obtained a German patronage. It absorbed, in 1942, a Georgian National-Socialist group led by Guiorgui Magalachvili and was renamed into the Georgian National-Socialist Party of Tetri Giorgi. Driven by practical consideration and cooperating with the Wehrmacht, the party did not share ideology with the German National Socialist Party. Its leader, Professor Tsereteli, resolutely opposed to adoption of the party’s statute in emigration, calling for taking local Caucasian peculiarities into account once the party was moved in Georgia freed from the Soviet control. Members of the group were amongst those settled in Kosakenland (Located in Carnia, Italy). However, due to discrimination by the Cossacks and the other groups within Kosakenland, some of the members of the organization later distanced themselves from the Germans and adhered to the local Stalin Battalion or the Brigate Osoppo.

With the German defeat in the war, the Georgian émigré activities waned and Tetri Giorgi went in obscurity. Under its influence, 3 homonymous conspiracy groups were formed in Soviet Georgia, one – led by the lawyer Evgen Gvaladze – in 1926-1937; 2nd - led by the Colonel of the Georgian National Army (1918-1921) Alexander Chavchavadze - in 1928-1930 and the 3rd – of which the subsequently conspicuous writer Chabua Amirejibi was a member – in the 1940s. Both of these were promptly neutralized and their members were repressed by the Soviet secret police.
