= Stalin Battalion =

Battalion of the Brigate Garibaldi

- Flag of the partisan unit
- Active: 8 September 1943–14 May 1945
- Disbanded: 14 May 1945
- Country: Republic of Carnia; Italy
- Allegiance: Brigate Garibaldi
- Type: Partisan battalion
- Colors: Red
- Engagements: World War II: Operation Ataman; Battle of Ovaro

Commanders
- Commander (Until November 1944): Daniil Varfolomeevič Avdeev
- Political director: Valentin Bobkov

The Stalin Battalion was the term used for two partisan divisions that worked within the Brigate Garibaldi and operated in Friuli-Venezia Giulia. The battalion was mostly composed of Soviet partisans of Russian, Polish, Georgian, Ukrainian and Cossack descent.

== Activities ==
The battalion was made of 361 partisans, and was founded on 8 September 1943.

Initially, the party operated mostly in Cavazzo Carnico and Amaro, and its political director for most of the war was Valentin Bobkov, known as "Silos".

Their main targets were the German Army and their Cossack collaborators of the Kazachi Stan encampment stationed in and governing the puppet entity Kosakenland. The Stalin battalion had two divisions, the first division which operated in Carnia, and the second one which operated in most of Friuli.

Many of the Georgians living in Carnia during the rule of Kosakenland started to develop a favourable opinion of Joseph Stalin due to their discrimination by other groups settled in the area, and also started to idolize the Italian partisans. Some joined the Stalin battalion.

== Aftermath ==
A few days after the end of the war, on 14 May 1945, 150 partisans of the battalion departed towards the Allied-occupied Austria where they joined the Soviet forces and were pardoned, also bringing along two willing Carnese women.

97 partisans within the battalion had died by the end of the war.
