= Operation Ataman =

1944 German operation in Northern Italy

- Part of Italian campaign (World War II) and World War II
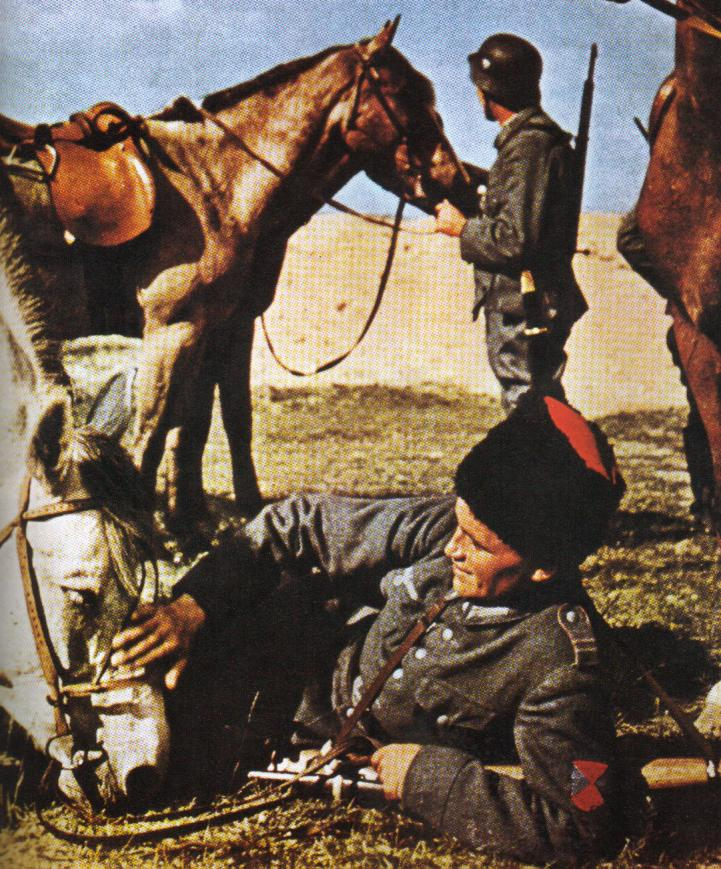
- Kazachi Stan in Carnia
Date	Autumn 1944
Location	Carnia, Italy
Result	German-Cossack victory
Territorial changes	Temporary creation of Kosakenland in Northern Italy

Belligerents
Germany; Kosakenland	Republic of Carnia

Commanders and leaders
Pyotr Krasnov; Sultan Klych-Girey; Timofey Domanov	

Strength
Kazachi Stan (11,000)	

The term Operation Ataman refers to the military occupation of the northeastern area of Friuli, also known as Carnia, by the Kazachi Stan, a mobile encampment and a combat formation composed of Cossacks who collaborated with Nazi Germany during World War II, to secure the Operational Zone of the Adriatic Littoral.

== History ==
=== Background ===
During the German invasion of the USSR, the German armed forces, alongside the Italian ones, incorporated within their armies thousands of Cossacks who volunteered to be part of the Wehrmacht, the Waffen-SS, and the Royal Italian Army. A significant portion of these belonged to the Kazachi Stan, a mobile encampment and a combat formation composed of Cossacks who collaborated with Nazi Germany during World War II. On 10 November 1943, when the USSR had already liberated significant portions of their initially lost territories, an edict by the ministry of the occupied territories, Alfred Rosenberg, and the commander of the Wehrmacht Wilhelm Keitel, assured the Kazachi Stan that, once the USSR was defeated, they would be provided significant autonomy in their native territories, and, temporarily, in other parts of Europe if at any given time it was impossible for them to return to their homeland.

=== Kosakenland ===
Throughout the whole summer of 1944, the area of Northern Friuli was the protagonist of numerous partisan operations, which culminated on 26 September 1944 with the establishment of the Republic of Carnia.

For this very reason, in July 1944, the Higher SS and Police leader which was assigned to Trieste by Nazi Germany, Odilo Globocnik, agreed to allow the procedure of a program in favour of the settlement of Cossack units loyal to Germany in the area: It was the start of what would be known as Operation Ataman, which in just a few week, would manage to settle up to 22,000 Cossacks (Including 9,000 soldiers, 6,000 elders, 4,000 of family members and 3,000 children) and 4,000 Caucasians (2,000 soldiers and 2,000 family members) with the use of up to 50 military trains.

Having defeated the Republic of Carnia, the Nazi-aligned Cossacks started to build what they called the "Kosakenland in Norditalien," which had been promised by the Germans. This began with the replication of Cossack's social organizations, style of life and religious rituals within the newly settled territories. The comune of Verzegnis had become the general headquarters of the Cossacks' forces' supreme leader, Pëtr Nikolaevič Krasnov, whilst other villages and towns were renamed with Russian city names (Alesso was renamed after Novočerkassk, Trasaghis was renamed after Novorossijsk , and Cavazzo in Krasnodar). Tolmezzo had also become the headquarters of the Cossack autonomous council.

Because two very different ethnic groups were settled systematically within the region by Germany, the Cossacks and the Caucasians, the region was split in half, with Sultan Klych-Girey being put in charge of the areas settled by Circassians and other Caucasian ethnic groups, specifically northern Kosakenland.

It's worth noting however that not everyone within the newly settled territories remained loyal to the Germans, and some, instead, joined the Italian resistance movement, creating what would be called the "Stalin" battalion.

Up until 29 April 1945, Kosakenland had its own newspaper, named "Kazackaja Zemlja" (Cossack's Land).

=== Aftermath ===
The Cossacks and the Caucasians stayed within Kosakenland up until the Battle of Ovaro, on 2 May 1945.

With the Allied offensive in Italy advancing, the Cossacks of Carnia withdrew to the Plöcken Pass and then to Austria, where on 9 May 1945, they surrendered to British troops in Lienz. Most of them were forcibly repatriated to the Soviet Union. The Cossack leadership was put on trial and executed; the fighting force was sentenced to the Gulag or sent to "special settlements" (exile).

== Further sources ==
- Carlo Sgorlon (1985). L'armata dei fiumi perduti. Romanzo. Milano: Mondadori.
- Pieri Stefanutti (1995). Novocerkassk e dintorni: l'occupazione cosacca della Valle del Lago (ottobre 1944 - aprile 1945). Udine: IFSML.
- Patrizia Deotto (2005). Stanitsa Tèrskja. L'illusione cosacca di una terra. Udine: Gaspari. ISBN 978-88-7541-025-4.
- Rosanna Rossa (2007). Venti cammelli sul Tagliamento. L'avventura cosacca in Friuli dal 1944 al 1945. Udine: IFSML. ISBN 978-88-87388-20-6.
- Leonardo Zanier (2010). Carnia, Kosakenland. Racconti di ragazzi in guerra (PDF). Udine: Forum. ISBN 978-88-8420-635-0.
- Diego Franzolini (2015). KAZACIJA ZEMLJA. Terra Cosacca al confine orientale d'Italia 1944-1945. Aviani&Aviani Editori. ISBN 978-88-7772-211-9.

== See also ==
- XV SS Cossack Cavalry Corps
