= Jaroslav Javney =

Ukrainian partisan

- Ярослав Явний
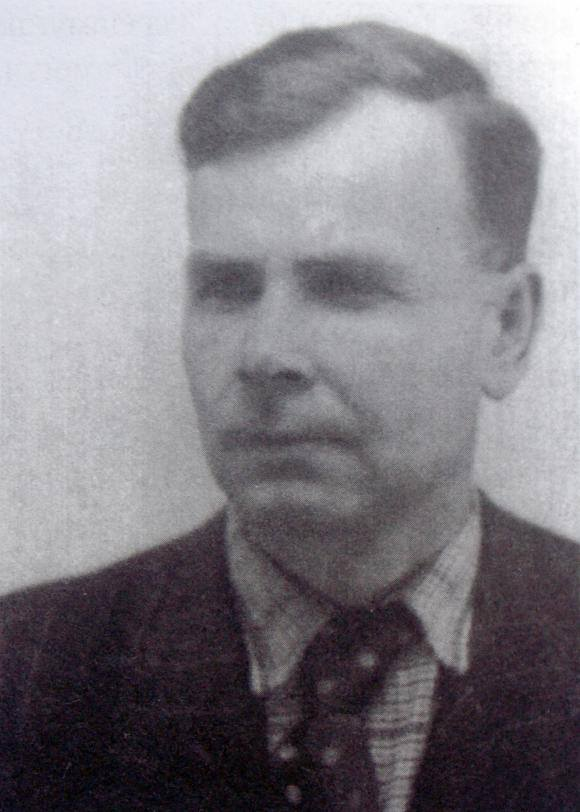
- Born: 1913; Koshliaky Pidvolochysk, Russian Empire (now Ukraine)
- Died: 28 September 1944 (aged 30–31); Udine, Italy
- Cause of death: Grenade explosion
- Burial place: Preone, Friuli Venezia Giulia
- Military career
- Allegiance: Ukrainian Insurgent Army; Italian resistance movement
- Units: Brigate Garibaldi; Stalin Battalion
- Conflicts: World War II

Jaroslav Javney (Ukrainian: Ярослав Явний, romanized: Yaroslav Yavnyi; 1913 – 28 September 1944) was a Ukrainian partisan who operated in Ukraine and the Italian region of Carnia during World War II. He operated in the Stalin Battalion up until his death after being sent by the Ukrainian Insurgent Army for an intel mission in the area aimed at making contacts with the Allied forces through the Italian resistance movement. He died whilst on duty nearby Udine in 1944.

== Early life ==
Javney was born in 1913, Koshliaky Pidvolochysk, a village in the proximity of Ternopil which at the time was part of the Russian Empire. From a young age he joined the Organisation of Ukrainian Nationalists and his name appears on their lists.

== Resistance ==
In June 1932, during the time of the Second Polish Republic, the Polish court in Kolomyia sentenced him alongside five other Ukrainians for being members of the OUN; He remained in jail for one year.

In 1943 the Ukrainian Insurgent Army sent Javney and other cells to contact the Allied powers through the Badogliani partisan division in Italy in order to convince them to recognize the independence of Ukraine. They first reached the city of Šibenik, however, it seemed like their goal was too difficult to achieve from there, and thus they opted to move to Carnia.

During his operations in the region he joined the Stalin Battalion, mostly formed by Soviet residents who joined the local Italian resistance against Nazi Germany, Kosakenland and the Italian Social Republic. Despite the Stalin Battalion being mostly communist, he never fully adhered to its ideals.

During his operations in the woods of Carnia he met a young girl named Adalina Fachin, to whom he confided parts of his secret mission to contact the Allied powers. As the kid returned home from school, she was later killed.

== Death and burial ==
He died on 28 September 1944 in the proximity of Udine when a grenade exploded in his hands right before a German counter offensive. Following his death, priest Pio Ferrante Polo justified his burial by stating to the German authorities that the partisan was from Poland and thus was part of the Catholic community and deserved a burial, which the local authorities conceded. In 1972 a former commander of his, who had moved to Canada, visited the region and paid respect by replacing the iron Catholic cross with a marble stele and adding a Cyrillic transliteration of his name on the grave.

== Legacy ==
His burial place is visited by local Carnians, who know him as "The Russian" (despite not being of Russian descent) and also Ukrainians. His official commemoration as a partisan took place in Preone (his burial place) on 22 October 2016, with the oversight of Mayor Andrea Martinis, Deputy Mayor Anna Lenisa, the Ukrainian Ambassador to Italy Yevhen Perelygin, the Consul General in Milan Roman Goriainov, the President of the Council of the Friuli-Venezia-Giulia Region Franco Iacop, Regional Councillor Enzo Marsilio, the Provincial Vice President of the ANPI Adriano Bertolini, the Archbishop of the Orthodox Church of the Kyiv Patriarchate Ilarion, Monsignor Petru Parvu, Monsignor Pietro Piller for the parish of Ampezzo, Monsignor Giancarlo Brianti for the Diocese of Udine and the choir of the Kyiv Theological Academy "Axios".
