= Cossack collaboration with Nazi Germany =

WWII anti-Soviet colloboration

Main Administration of Cossack Forces Hauptverwaltung der Kosakenheere
- Главное управление казачьих войск
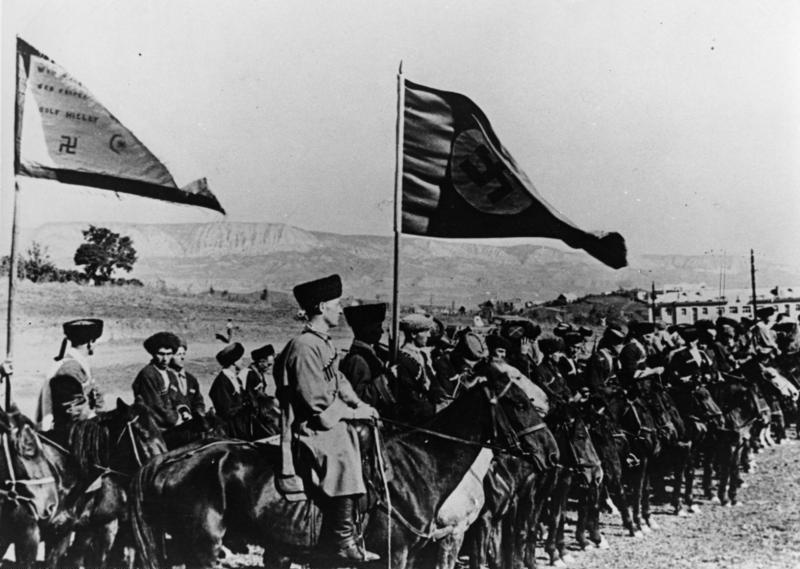
- Cossack troops in the Wehrmacht, occupied Soviet Union, 1942
- Predecessor: Cossack Central Office (Berlin)
- Formation: March 1944
- Dissolved: May 1945
- Legal status: Subordinate department of the Reich Ministry for the Occupied Eastern Territories
- Headquarters: Berlin, Nazi Germany
- Region served: Northeastern Italy (Kosakenland in Norditalien), Belarus, and occupied Western Europe
- Members: Approx. 70,000: Kazachi Stan; XV SS Cossack Cavalry Corps; Cossack auxiliary police and Eastern battalions
- Key people: Pyotr Krasnov (Head of Administration) (executed); Vyacheslav Naumenko (Deputy Head); Semyon Krasnov (Chief of Staff) (executed); Timofey Domanov (Field Ataman, Kazachi Stan) (executed); Andrei Shkuro (Kosaken-Reserve Lead) (executed)
- Publication: Various localized military and civic periodicals

Cossack collaboration with Nazi Germany represents a complex and controversial chapter of World War II collaborationist movements. For Cossack émigré leaders, the German invasion offered an opportunity to overthrow Bolshevik rule and secure political autonomy. The German Wehrmacht and later the Waffen-SS had different motives. They eagerly bypassed Nazi racial ideology to fix severe manpower shortages. Driven by decades of state-driven "de-Cossackization" and the trauma of collectivization, tens of thousands of Cossacks joined the invading Axis forces beginning in 1941. In addition to voluntary recruitment in traditional Cossack lands, collaborationist atamans and German authorities relied heavily on the exploitation of Soviet prisoners of war.

During the war, Cossack forces evolved from auxiliary detachments into structured military and administrative entities. The Kazachi Stan militia and the XV SS Cossack Cavalry Corps were the largest combat formations, with political leadership concentrated in the Main Administration of Cossack Forces. Deployed in rear-area security roles, the Cossack combat formations carried out scorched-earth campaigns against civilian populations and partisan networks across Belarus, Yugoslavia, Poland, and Northern Italy. As the Axis fronts collapsed across Europe in 1945, the leadership believed that the alliance between the Western Powers and the Soviet Union would break and that they will be re-armed for a war against the Soviet Union. They raced into Austria to surrender to the British forces.

Presenting themselves as political refugees, over 45,000 combatants and civilian dependents surrendered in May 1945, but their fate had already been sealed. Facing a logistical crisis in a volatile border region, British authorities prioritized quick removal of hostile forces over humanitarian concerns. The forced repatriation program transferred the vast majority to Soviet custody. It included 3,000 deported non-Soviet "old émigrés" and violated the citizenship parameters of the Yalta Agreement. The handovers delivered the Cossack leadership to execution and the rest to the Gulag system and internal exile.

The historical memory of Cossack collaboration became a source of debate within Western Cold War circles and post-Soviet Russia. Surviving émigré leaders, aided by Western supporters, and publications like Vyacheslav Naumenko’s The Great Betrayal built a false narrative that focused almost exclusively on their status as supposed victims of "Western betrayal". The myth minimized or erased Cossack collaborators' integration into the Nazi security apparatus and their war crimes. Modern nationalist groups in Russia launched campaigns in the 1990s to formally rehabilitate executed commanders like Pyotr Krasnov and Helmuth von Pannwitz. The effort failed. Russian military courts upheld their convictions, barring them from historical vindication.

== Background ==
The mobilization of Cossack forces for the German war effort grew out of the political upheavals following the 1917 Russian Civil War. The Cossacks had served as a privileged military caste under the Russian Tsars. After the war, they faced destruction during the Bolshevik policy of "de-Cossackization". This policy involved mass expulsions, asset expropriation, and the formal abolition of the Cossack hosts. Repression intensified during forced collectivization and the famines of the 1930s. These actions left anti-Soviet sentiment throughout the Don, Kuban, and Terek regions. At the same time, a Cossack émigré community grew in Western Europe. This group aimed to restore traditional social order and waited for an opportunity to dismantle the Soviet state. When German forces invaded the USSR, many Cossacks viewed the Wehrmacht as a liberating force and a vehicle for retribution.

== Early collaboration (1941–1942) ==
The senior Cossack leadership greeted the launch of Operation Barbarossa in June 1941 with immense enthusiasm. Driven by opportunism and anti-communist ideology, they viewed the German invasion as a divine intervention to overthrow the Bolshevik regime. They hoped for the restoration of their liquidated hosts, traditional land rights, and political autonomy. In exchange for a powerful sponsor capable of reversing decades of Soviet oppression, they willfully ignored Nazi racial animosity toward Slavic populations. Veteran White Army émigrés like General Pyotr Krasnov immediately issued public proclamations. He urged Cossacks inside the Soviet Union and across Europe to take up arms alongside the German Wehrmacht in a holy war against communism. Krasnov wrote: "I wish to state to all Cossacks that this is not a war against Russia, but against Communists, Jews and their minions who trade in Russian blood. May God help the German sword and Hitler!" Vyacheslav Naumenko, a Kuban Cossack leader, and Gerasim Vdovenko, Ataman of the Terek Host, expressed similar sentiments.

Krasnov contacted Joseph Goebbels, the German Minister of Propaganda, and asked for permission to speak on Radio Berlin's Russian language broadcasts. From late June 1941 onward, Krasnov was a regular speaker on Radio Berlin's Russian-language station and delivered pro-Nazi, antisemitic speeches that portrayed the Soviet government as the rule of "Judeo-Bolsheviks" and the German forces advancing into the Soviet Union as liberators. However, the German authorities had no plans of utilizing Russian émigrés; on the eve of the invasion, they were put under travel restrictions and not allowed to visit the occupied Soviet Union until summer 1942. No role in organizing indigenous liberation movements or armed forces was envisioned for them.

=== Wehrmacht pragmatism ===
Despite Hitler's restrictions on arming Soviet nationals, front-line necessity forced Wehrmacht commanders to recruit locally. Starting with the early fall of 1941, German field commands bypassed racial directives to integrate Cossack defectors and prisoners of war into security detachments. The Wehrmacht relied on these units for rear-area security, using them to guard supply lines and run sweeps against bypassed Soviet soldiers. Official approval arrived on 6 October from Eduard Wagner, the Quartermaster General, authorizing each of the Army Group Rear Area Commands (North, South, and Center) to establish a Cossack "hundred" (sotnia) for security duties.

A Cossack sotnia within the 221st Security Division was already operating in October 1941. Another early detachments was formed under the auspices of intelligence officers of Army Group Center Rear Area. It was led by the Soviet regimental commander Ivan Kononov, who crossed the frontline in Belarus in August 1941 and recruited a Cossack unit from POW camps. In mid-October 1941, the XIV Panzer Corps encountered Nikolai Nazarenko's Cossack militia attacking the Red Army from the rear near the Mius river. After an interview with General Gustav von Wietersheim, the Wehrmacht enlisted Nazarenko and his eighty surviving men as a reconnaissance battalion.

Following the trauma of Soviet de-Cossackization, many Cossacks initially welcomed German forces as liberators. In the areas with heavy Cossack population, such as the Rostov Oblast in the south of Russia in 1941 and the Kuban and North Caucasus in 1942 (Fall Blau), local Cossack leaders responded with spontaneous offers of armed collaboration to signal their allegiance. Cossacks were formed into self-defense detachment and given captured Soviet weapons. To encourage collaboration, the Wehrmacht allowed Cossacks to reopen churches and promised to restore traditional land rights and autonomous local governance. But the collective farms were never abolished, and initial enthusiasm waned. In general, the Cossack eagerness to serve the Germans was not as widespread as the Nazi propaganda claimed; most of the Cossacks chose wait-and-see approach, and neither collaborated nor actively resisted. As the German army abandoned North Caucasus and Kuban over the winter of 1942–1943, thousands of collaborators and their families left with them and moved to Kamenets-Podolsk in Ukraine and other locations.

To offset severe combat losses the Wehrmacht leadership turned to the systemic exploitation of Soviet prisoners of war held in German stalags (POW camps). Thousands of captured Red Army soldiers, both of verifiable Cossack descent and regular Soviet conscripts who falsely claimed Cossack identity, chose survival through collaboration. By April 1943, about 25,000 troops served in 20 Cossack regiments, ranging in size from 400 to 1,000 personnel, almost all of them former POWs. Only about half were actually Cossacks. They had suffered repression under the Soviet rule and were thus more reliable for the Germans. Vyacheslav Naumenko used his prestige to recruit Cossacks to fight for Germany. In March 1942, German policy towards Soviet POWs changed from letting them starve to death to exploiting them for their labor or their service. Starting in the spring of 1942, Naumenko toured the POW camps urging Cossack POWs to enlist in the Wehrmacht.

Cossack units proved efficient and more motivated than other collaborators. The military centralized and processed them through training installations such as Mielau, Poland, as part of its Ostlegionen (Eastern Legions) administration. German commanders valued these detachments because their mobility, horseback scouting, and language fluency made them effective for security operations and anti-partisan sweeps. By early 1943, the defeat at the Battle of Stalingrad and subsequent combat attrition forced a change in policy. In April 1943, Hitler authorized the consolidation of all Cossack detachments into a single military organization. This centralization led to the formation of the 1st Cossack Cavalry Division under German Major General Helmuth von Pannwitz. The move transitioned the Cossack forces from regional auxiliaries into a conventional combat division.

=== Auxiliary police units ===
The German occupation authorities also channeled Cossack volunteers across Ukraine and occupied Russia into the Cossack Schutzmannschaft (auxiliary police) battalions. Operating within the chain of command of the Higher SS and Police Leaders, these auxiliary units enforced the administrative and racial edicts of the Nazi occupation apparatus. The Cossack Schutzmannschaft battalions guarded transit corridors and POW camps and policed rural communities. They served in occupied Poland and Soviet Union.

== Administrative and governing structures ==
The coordination and mobilization of Cossack collaborationist forces were managed through a fragmented network of competing Nazi state agencies, military commands, and émigré organizations. As the war progressed, the administrative apparatus evolved away from decentralized Wehrmacht front-line recruitment toward centralized political and security organs managed by the Reich Ministry for the Occupied Eastern Territories (Eastern Ministry) and later the Waffen-SS.

=== Institutional cooperation and rivalries ===
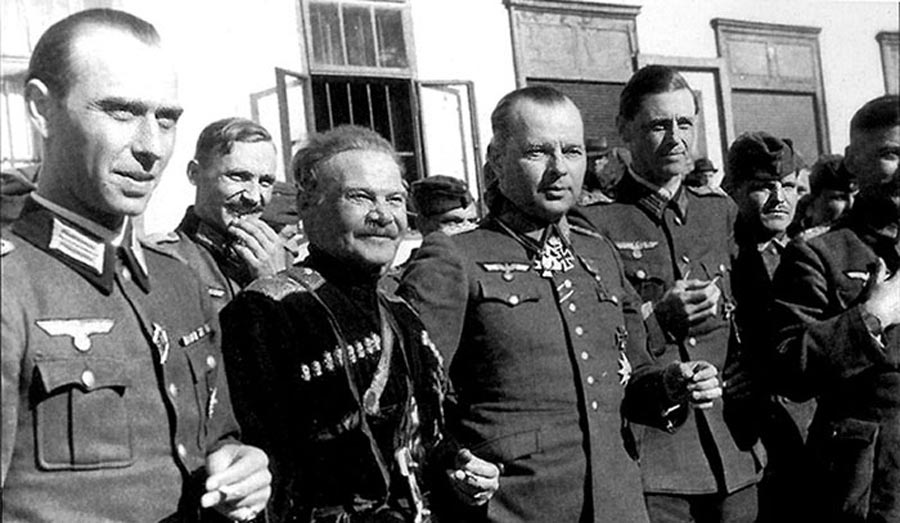
General Andrei Shkuro and Helmuth von Pannwitz in 1943

High-level collaboration between Cossack leadership and Nazi Germany was orchestrated by a mix of veteran White Army émigrés and freshly defected Soviet commanders, who sought to leverage German military power to secure long-term political autonomy. Prominent figures like General Pyotr Krasnov and General Andrei Shkuro operated at the highest administrative levels, working alongside the Alfred Rosenberg's Reich Ministry for the Occupied Eastern Territories (Eastern Ministry). Despite initial reservations, the German setbacks of the winter of 1941 and 1942 led to ever increasing use of Cossacks auxiliary forces by the Wehrmacht. So that not to be left behind, Rosenberg jumped on the Cossack bandwagon and established the Cossack Central Office in mid-1942 to coordinate ideological propaganda and recruitment strategies. Krasnov became its head in January 1943.

Initially, Rosenberg considered the Cossacks to be Russians, and he ascribed to the popular German stereotype of Cossacks as thugs and looters. However, as the numbers of Cossacks rallying to the Reich continued to grow into 1942, Roseberg, supported by SS racial experts, changed his opinion. He declared that the Cossacks were instead a separate "race" descended from the Ostrogoths, and therefore were Aryan. Rosenberg envisioned that after its victory Germany would establish a new puppet state to be called Cossackia in the traditional territories of the Don, Kuban, Terek, Askrakhan, Ural and Orenburg Hosts in southeastern Russia. Most of the Cossack leaders such as Krasnov tended to reject the separatist concept of "Cossackia", but since it was German policy, they had little choice in the matter.

Bureaucratic rivalries within the Nazi occupation apparatus undermined the administration of Cossack forces. Alfred Rosenberg's Eastern Ministry wanted to develop the Cossacks into a partner elite to police post-Soviet space. This vision clashed with Heinrich Himmler’s SS and police network. The SS rejected Cossack autonomy and demanded absolute subordination to their security commands for counter-insurgency operations.

The Wehrmacht initially shielded these cavalry units to preserve their combat effectiveness. The institutional balance finally broke in 1944. The SS used the Reich's logistical crisis to outmaneuver the Eastern Ministry. The SS stripped the civilian ministry of its influence and absorbed the primary Cossack combat formations into the Waffen-SS. In a way, that was the inevitable result of Germany's continued defeats, as the "Eastern territories" gradually disappeared off Wehrmacht's situation maps and Rosenberg's influence waned.

In September 1944, Heinrich Himmler formalized the absorption of the 1st Cossack Cavalry Division into the Waffen-SS as the XV SS Cossack Cavalry Corps. Under this change, the cavalrymen retained their uniforms, internal ataman structures, and unique insignia. However, the SS command apparatus now controlled their deployment. The SS Main Office took over their supply lines, funding, and legal jurisdictions. This step ensured that the corps operated as an instrument of Himmler's security system during its final campaigns in Yugoslavia.

=== November 1943 OKW declaration ===
By late 1943, continued retreats across the Eastern Front forced the Nazi hierarchy to formalize their alliance with the displaced Cossacks. On 10 November 1943, the German High Command (OKW) and the Reich Ministry for the Occupied Eastern Territories issued the "Declaration to the Cossacks" (Deklaration an die Kosaken). Reich Minister Alfred Rosenberg and Field Marshal Wilhelm Keitel signed the document to secure the loyalty of the uprooted troops as the war deteriorated. The declaration sought to fix a severe recruitment and morale crisis. Axis forces had permanently lost the Don, Kuban, and Terek regions, making the Cossack struggle for their homeland appear moot.

The declaration made sweeping, unprecedented legal and territorial promises to the Cossacks in exchange for continued military service under Axis command. It guaranteed the postwar restoration of Cossack land privileges, historic tax exemptions, and the future establishment of an autonomous puppet state, termed "Cossackia", in their ancestral lands. Crucially, the declaration promised that if the German army could not recapture their homelands, the Reich would grant them land elsewhere in Europe. This pledge authorized the formal establishment of the Kazachi Stan mobile encampment later that month and set the stage for the colony's 1944 resettlement into the Carnia region of northern Italy.

=== Main Administration of Cossack Forces ===
In mid 1942, the Eastern Ministry established the Cossack Central Office in Berlin, initially elevating the separatist wing of the Cossack diaspora. After a period of underperformance, Rosenberg offered the role of the head of the office to Tsarist-era cavalry General Pyotr Krasnov, as a much less divisive figure. The appointment took place in early 1943, following the German defeat at the Battle of Stalingrad and the Axis retreat from the Don and Kuban territories. Rosenberg used Krasnov as a prestigious figurehead to inspire recruitment among Soviet prisoners of war and the émigré diaspora. Initially, the office functioned as an advisory liaison bureau. It tracked scattered anti-Soviet groups and managed propaganda, such as promises to establish an autonomous Cossackia state under German patronage.

Krasnov acted as the primary mediator when friction arose between German military commands and native troops. For example, when the newly formed 1st Cossack Cavalry Division was ordered to the Balkans in September 1943 to fight Yugoslav partisans instead of the Red Army, Pannwitz, the division's commander, wanted Krasnov to break the news to the troops. The Wehrmacht High Command dispatched Krasnov and Vyacheslav Naumenko to the training grounds. Krasnov and Naumenko delivered well publicized addresses that convinced the dissatisfied soldiers that fighting communist partisans in Yugoslavia was part of the global struggle against Soviet Bolshevism. They promised the men that they would ultimately go on to fight on the Eastern Front.

In March 1944, the office expanded into the Main Administration of Cossack Forces (Hauptverwaltung der Kosakenheere; Glavnoye Upravleniye Kazachikh Voysk). It operated as an official department under Alfred Rosenberg's Eastern Ministry. Pyotr Krasnov headed the administration, with Major General Semyon Krasnov serving as chief of staff. This body handled the bureaucratic oversight of "sub-Soviet" Cossacks (podsovettskiye kazaki), which included recent Red Army defectors, prisoners of war, and forced laborers (Ostarbeiter) of Cossack descent scattered across the Reich. The administration focused on tracking these individuals within the labor and penal camp systems. Staff screened them for reliability and recruited them to fill the ranks of expanding collaborationist units. The department published propaganda periodicals, managed the training of native officer cadres, and established youth programs to foster an anti-Soviet regional identity.

Even though Krasnov was able to hire military staff, he had no control over Pannwitz's forces or any Cossack auxiliary units. Krasnov appointed Naumenko as his "minister of war", with additional "ministerial" roles going to Nikolai Kulakov (Cossack leader) of the Terek Host and Sergei Pavlov (Cossack leader), the field ataman of the Kazachi Stan. When Krasnov was out of Berlin, Naumenko served as the acting director of the Administration.

=== The Kosaken-Reserve ===
To bypass traditional military lines and secure direct influence over eastern formations (Osttruppen), the SS established its own competing administrative organ known as the Kosaken-Reserve (Cossack Reserve) in March 1944. Operating under the direct jurisdiction of the SS Main Office, this body was commanded by prominent White Army veteran General Andrei Shkuro, who was granted an SS-equivalent rank of Gruppenführer. While Krasnov's administration focused on Soviet-born personnel, Shkuro's reserve pipeline was designed to mobilize the older interwar émigré diaspora living across occupied Western and Central Europe. The organization functioned as a centralized military depot, gathering scattered exile volunteers, providing them with training, and delivering them as front-line replacements to Helmuth von Pannwitz's XV SS Cossack Cavalry Corps.

=== Headquarters of the Kazachi Stan ===
The Headquarters of the Ataman of the Kazachi Stan managed the day-to-day governance of the displaced Cossack populations. Formalized by German authorities in late 1943 following the OKW declaration, this administrative body was led initially by Ataman Sergei Pavlov (Cossack leader) and later by Major General Timofey Domanov. Operating as a mobile, semi-autonomous administrative government, the headquarters maintained civil, judicial, and logistical control over a fluid population of about 25,000 people, which included roughly 8,000 militia troops and thousands of family dependents. Under German military supervision, this native administration coordinated the massive relocations of the entire colony from Ukraine to Novogrudok (Belarus) and then into the Carnia region of northeastern Italy.

== Nazi security warfare (1943–1945) ==
By 1943–1944, all Nazi-aligned Cossack forces, from civilian-heavy Kazachi Stan to combat units, were integrated into the Axis framework of Bandenbekämpfung (Nazi security warfare). As the security landscape deteriorated on the Eastern Front and in the Balkans, German rear-area commands relied on Cossack formations to protect vital supply corridors and deprive partisans of logistical support within the local communities. Because the German High Command categorized guerrilla resistance not as partisan warfare but as criminal subversion, Cossack detachments operated under explicit directives that authorized collective punishment against any elements suspected of aiding the partisans.

The execution of these anti-partisan operations resulted in widespread atrocities against civilian populations across Belarus, Yugoslavia, and northeastern Italy. The operations in "bandit-infested" areas amounted to destruction of villages, seizure of livestock, deporting of able-bodied population for slave labour to Germany and murder of those of non-working age. These reprisals terrorized local communities and locked all branches of the Cossack collaborationist hierarchy into the criminal occupational machinery.

=== Belarus ===
Following the abandonment of Kuban, the displaced Cossacks who had volunteered to serve the Germans were organized into a nomadic administrative and military structure that became known as the Kazachi Stan. Formed under the direction of the Eastern Ministry and veteran émigré leaders, this "Cossack State" sought to maintain community cohesion and military readiness while on the move. By the spring of 1944, the combat-ready elements of this population were deployed to the rear areas of Army Group Center in Belarus, near Novogrudok. They were tasked with guarding key highways.

Cossack formations continued to play critical roles in rear security in occupied Belarus since 1942. Key among them was Kosaken-Abteilung 600 commanded by Ivan Kononov. The unit committed numerous atrocities, including looting, burning of villages, and killing its inhabitants. It received high marks from the chain of command for its efficiency; Commander of Army Group Center Rear Area famously praised Cossack's combat readiness and "merciless" (rücksichtslos) methods toward the civilian population. Compared to other "Eastern battalions" staffed by former POWs, Kononov's unit enjoyed substantial confidence from the German command which was evidenced by a higher than typical proportion of indigenous, vs German, commanders within the unit.

Morale was also higher than general, with the Cossacks being impervious to partisan propaganda that encouraged desertion, at least throughout 1942. Things began to shift in 1943, after the German defeat at Stalingrad. In March 1943, two of Kononov's squadrons, plus an artillery battery, defected to the partisans. The remnants of the battalion were transferred to Poland to undergo replenishment in preparation for the consolidation of all Cossack units under a unified command structure. For the Kazachi Stan, the Belarus phase ended with the June 1944 Soviet Operation Bagration that destroyed Wehrmacht's Army Group Center. The encampment had to rapidly retreat towards Poland and was then transferred to Italy.

=== Yugoslavia ===
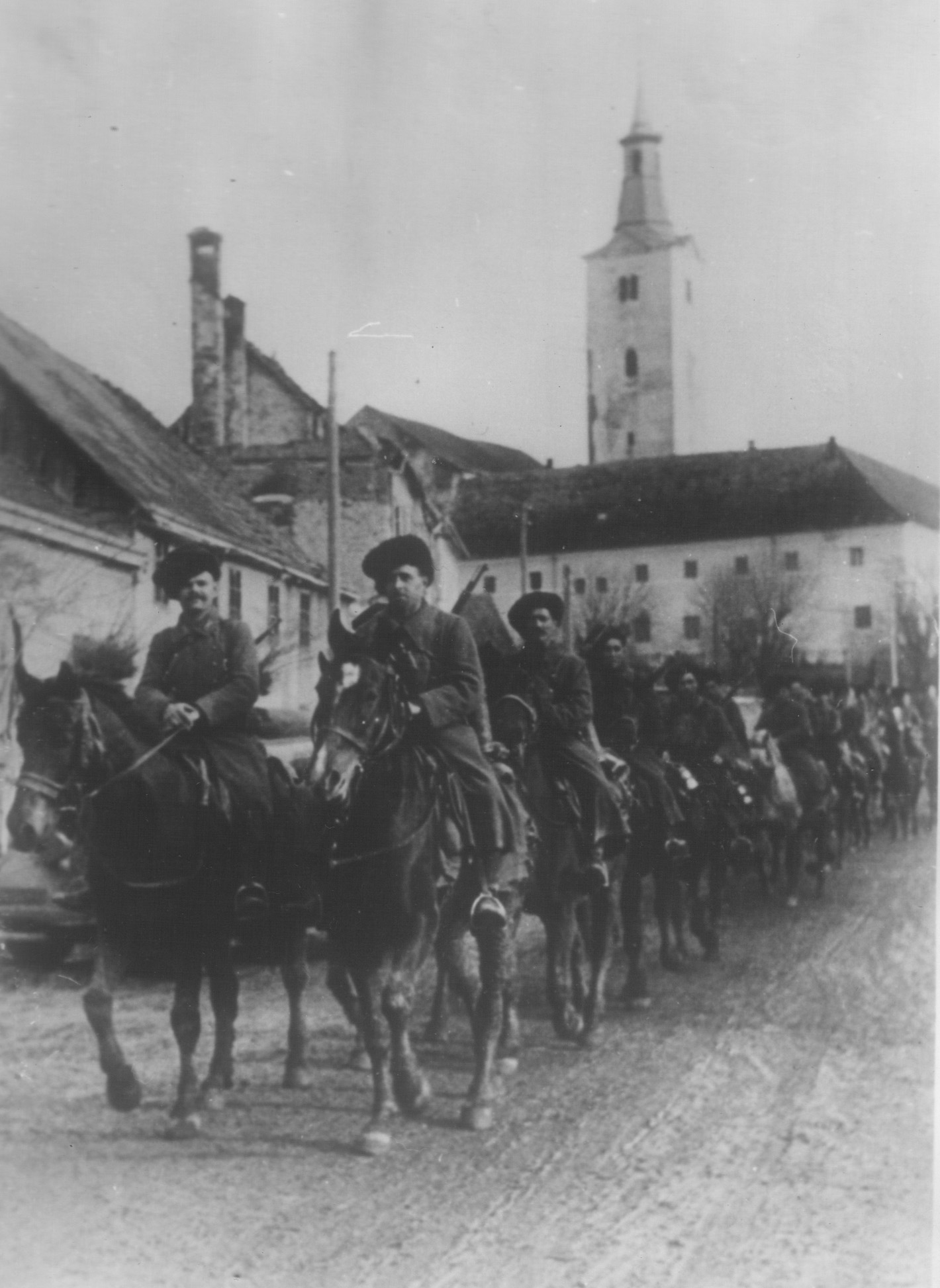
Cossack unit entering a Croatian village, February 1945

The German High Command (OKW) kept the newly formed 1st Cossack Cavalry Division away from frontline combat against the regular Red Army. German commanders feared that deploying Soviet nationals on the main Eastern Front would trigger mass defections and subversion. Furthermore, Adolf Hitler banned large, armed units of Soviet citizens from the main front line to prevent them from gaining political leverage to demand autonomy after the war. Instead, the Germans shipped the division to the puppet Independent State of Croatia in September 1943. This allowed the Germans to keep the units under surveillance while exploiting their mobility and equestrian scouting skills for counter-insurgency operations.

In Yugoslavia, the division became a central element of the Axis counter-insurgency effort. Initially subordinated to the Second Panzer Army, these forces secured rail lines and fought against Yugoslav Partisans across Croatia, Slavonia, and Bosnia. The Cossacks proved effective in mobile, anti-guerrilla operations, acquitting themselves well in the eyes of the German command. One operation even earned them a mention in the Wehrmachtbericht.

The division quickly established a reputation for undisciplined and ruthless behavior, not only towards the partisans but also the civilian population, prompting Croatian authorities to complain to the Germans and finally to Adolf Hitler himself. Besides raping women, killing people and plundering and burning towns suspected of harboring partisans and their supporters, the division used telegraph poles along the railroad tracks for mass hangings as a warning to the local population. During its first two months of deployment in Croatia, special divisional courts-martial imposed at least 20 death sentences in each of the four regiments for related crimes. This did not have the desired effect; in December 1944, a spate of looting and rapes in the Croatian town of Đurđevac left 26 people dead.

As the strategic situation deteriorated in late 1944, the division was formally transferred to the Waffen-SS as the XV SS Cossack Cavalry Corps. Initially reluctant, Pannwitz was swayed by the opportunity to expand his force to a corps and the promise of better supplies. Himmler came through, and replacements began to arrive from the Western front, where Cossack units were not meeting expectations. The Wehrmacht released its few remaining auxiliary Cossack formations from the Eastern Front as well. The division's two brigades were upgraded to a division each, with a third division being planned. The corps continued its campaign against Yugoslav forces and later against the advancing Red Army, until its final retreat into Austria in May 1945.

=== Warsaw Uprising ===
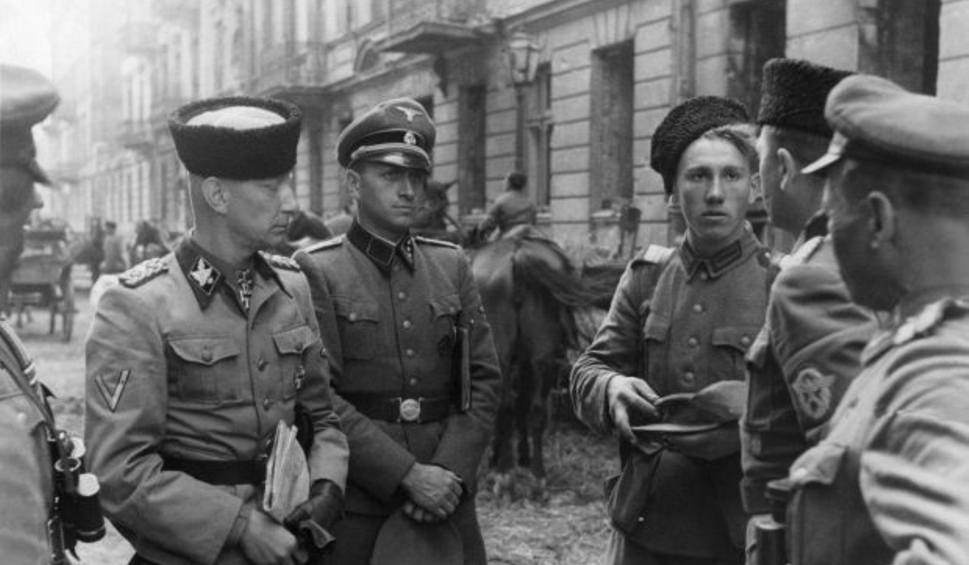
SS-Gruppenführer Heinz Reinefarth, the "Butcher of Wola" (left, in Cossack headgear) with Jakub Bondarenko, commander of Kuban Cossack Infantry regiment, during the suppression of Warsaw Uprising

In August 1944, the Germans deployed Cossack units to suppress the Warsaw Uprising. As the Polish Home Army fought to liberate the capital, SS and police commands rushed auxiliary units to the city. These included the Cossack Schutzmannschaft Battalion 209, two Cossack auxiliary battalions, and a regiment of Cossack infantry. Moving from rural Bandenbekämpfung, these detachments had to adapt to urban warfare.

The Cossack regiment was supplied by the Kazachi Stan at the direction of Erich von dem Bach-Zelewski, Chief of Bandenbekämpfung, who commanded the operation. Fighting alongside the Kaminski and Dirlewanger brigades, they cleared barricades, secured bridges, and burned down buildings to flush out resistance. Under Heinrich Himmler's orders to destroy the city, the detachments conducted mass executions, rounded up civilians for deportation, and looted abandoned districts.

=== Western Front ===
In the fall of 1943, a scandal embroiled the deployment of Osttruppen (eastern troops), which included Cossack units that were not absorbed in Pannwitz's 1st Cavalry division. Heinrich Himmler, head of the SS, alleged to Hitler that reverses of the summer were attributed to mass desertions from these units. Hitler, enraged, demanded that they be disarmed and used only as laborers, which the army was reluctant to do, due to manpower shortages. A compromise was reached whereas all eastern troops were transferred to the Western front where they were deployed as Wehrmacht coastal defense and security units. This completely removed the pretense that they were fighting for the liberation of their homelands and morale plummeted.

During the 1944 Allied liberation of Western Europe, several hundred Cossack auxiliary troops were captured by Allied forces in France. Cossacks, along with other Ostruppen personnel, showed little enthusiasm in fighting the Western Allies. For example, the 570th Cossack Battalion surrendered en masse at the first opportunity. Assumed to be regular German combatants based on their uniforms, these prisoners were sent to mainland United States POW camps. It was during later screenings there that military intelligence identified their Soviet nationality, isolating them as part of the emerging framework of Allied repatriation planning. They were moved to specialized facilities, such as the maximum-security stockade at Fort Dix, New Jersey.

=== Northern Italy ===
On 17 June 1944, the founding Field Ataman of the Kazachi Stan encampment Sergei Pavlov (Cossack leader) was fatally shot in the head while traveling between villages. The official investigation concluded that a Belarusian policeman mistakenly shot Pavlov, but rumors about a partisan ambush or an internal subversion persisted. German authorities appointed Timofey Domanov, Pavlov's chief of staff, to lead the community and promoted him to the rank of Major General. This was irregular as Field Atamans are supposed to be elected by Cossacks, rather than assigned by outsiders. Under Domanov's leadership, the Kazachi Stan accepted its next operational assignment: the relocation of its 25,000 personnel to northeastern Italy to suppress the Italian Resistance.

In July 1944, Higher SS and Police Leader Odilo Globocnik issued a directive known as Operation Ataman. The order transferred the Kazachi Stan via fifty trains to Carnia in northeastern Italy. Their purpose there was to secure Wehrmacht's tenuous supply corridors and suppress the partisan Republic of Carnia; with that in mind, the Kazachi Stan formed four infantry regiments. The Cossacks forced their families into requisitioned Italian homes and established an administration zone termed Kosakenland in Norditalien. The puppet state answered to Globocnik and the Operational Zone of the Adriatic Littoral through a dual-track authority structure. The SS ran the anti-partisan operations. Domanov and an autonomous council managed daily civic affairs. The arrangement lasted until the Axis collapse.

The town of Tolmezzo served as the administrative capital and headquarters for the Cossack leadership. To handle the 25,000 residents, Domanov built a comprehensive civic infrastructure which included primary schools, a high school, a hospital, a cadet academy, and a bank called the Feldsbank. A traditional Cossack tribunal enforced internal discipline to punish insubordination, theft, and desertion. It offered little protection to the displaced Italians, however. Cossack authorities evicted residents, seized property, and confiscated food to sustain the camp; many Italians joined the partisans in response.

Kosakenland eventually served as the host of various Cossack units and organizations fleeing Germany ahead of the Soviet advance. Krasnov and the staff of the Main Administration of Cossack Forces moved there from Berlin in February 1945. By late April, an influx of reinforcements from Shkuro's Kosaken-Reserve and auxiliary Caucasian units swelled the camp to over 32,000 individuals, shifting its composition to 18,000 combat personnel and 14,000 civilian dependents.

== Axis collapse ==
=== Towards German defeat ===
Throughout late 1944 and early 1945, the political cohesion of Axis eastern formations was paralyzed by an unyielding ideological conflict between Krasnov and General Andrey Vlasov. As the German military faced imminent collapse on the Eastern Front, the German High Command pressured all ex-Soviet collaborationist units to consolidate under General Vlasov's multi-ethnic Russian Liberation Army (ROA) to form a unified anti-communist military front. Krasnov fiercely resisted this directive, flatly refusing to subordinate his forces to Vlasov's newly established Committee for the Liberation of the Peoples of Russia (KONR).

The immediate impact was the fragmentation of Axis anti-Soviet forces. This division was driven by deep generational and political fault lines within the collaborationist hierarchy. Krasnov and his "old émigré" inner circle viewed Vlasov, a highly decorated former Soviet Red Army general, with profound distrust, dismissively framing his political platform as "rebranded Bolshevism". Krasnov in particular considered Vlasov to be a "Bolshevik at heart" and disliked him immensely. Conversely, Vlasov viewed the Cossack traditionalists as politically anachronistic and logistically redundant. Two meetings in December 1944 did not yield a unified front. This internal fracturing ensured that the Cossacks remained physically isolated within separate geographic theaters, bound independently to localized German SS and Wehrmacht commands in Yugoslavia and Northern Italy until the final, separate surrenders to the British Army in Austria.

As Nazi Germany increasingly lost the war throughout late 1944 and early 1945, the Cossack leadership succumbed to profound ideological delusions. They expected the alliance between the Western Powers and the Soviet Union would collapse the moment Berlin fell, same as it did after World War I. Pannwitz sent a delegation to Andrey Vlasov in March 1945; he thought that transferring his corps to KONR would shield it from the stigma of being associated with the SS. Pannwitz hoped that this would make a potential alliance more palatable to the Western Allies. The formal transfer to KONR took place on April 28, but had no practical effect as the war ended days later. Krasnov and Ataman Timofey Domanov operated under the same assumptions. They believed that Great Britain and the United States would launch an immediate, preventive war against Stalin to stop Soviet expansion into Central Europe. They expected that the Western Allies would re-arm and redeploy them as an elite vanguard in the upcoming global conflict.

In any event, the Cossacks' fate had already been sealed. During the Yalta Conference in February 1945, British Prime Minister Winston Churchill and US President Franklin D. Roosevelt agreed to a mutual repatriation protocol. The agreement mandated the return of all Soviet citizens to the USSR. Soviet negotiators demanded the return of personnel captured in German uniforms, branding them as traitors and war criminals. Churchill and Roosevelt complied because they wanted to ensure that the USSR safely returned liberated Western prisoners of war. The Yalta agreement applied only to individuals who held Soviet citizenship as of 1 September 1939. However, the policy created an environment where British field commanders overlooked legal distinctions, handing over both Soviet citizens and old Tsarist émigrés alike.

=== Surrender ===
In May 1945, the Kazachi Stan and the XV SS Cossack Cavalry Corps retreated into Carinthia, British-occupied southern Austria. Over 45,000 Cossack combatants and civilian dependents surrendered to the British V Corps. The Kazachi Stan caravan completed its surrender protocols between 8 and 10 May, as the massive columns finished crossing the alpine Plöcken Pass and entered the Drava Valley, establishing their temporary encampment around Lienz. The XV SS Cossack Cavalry Corps formally surrendered on 11–12 May 1945, after retreating out of Yugoslavia and establishing contact with British troops near Völkermarkt, Austria. Pannwitz sought to set conditions so that his force would not be handed over to the Red Army, but his British interlocutor would have none of that. He demanded an unconditional surrender as were the terms for all German units.

This unauthorized retreat directly violated the terms of the German Instrument of Surrender, which legally mandated all Axis-controlled forces to surrender to the immediate Allied commands facing them on their active fronts. Rather than surrendering to the Soviet and Yugoslav forces they were actively engaged with, both Cossack formations intentionally ignored the "stand fast" directive in a calculated attempt to evade responsibility and secure Western political asylum.

Allied protocols classified Soviet-manned Axis units as military collaborators to be handed over to the home country rather than refugees. The Kazachi Stan caravan, despite civilian dependents, was deemed a combat unit under Ataman Domanov, having been armed and integrated into the German military since 1943. Similarly, the 18,000–20,000 troops of the XV SS Cossack Cavalry Corps were treated as prisoners of war due to their full Waffen-SS equipment and organization. During surrender negotiations, as well as afterwards, Cossack commanders submitted written appeals and verbal declarations arguing that their personnel should be classified as anti-communist political refugees and stateless exiles legally exempt from Soviet jurisdiction. British commanders, bound by the Yalta Agreement, flatly refused to recognize the Cossacks' claims to asylum.

In May 1945, the British V Corps in southern Austria faced a mounting logistical crisis. Over 40,000 Cossacks, alongside 300,000 to 400,000 other refugees and retreating troops, arrived in the area and strained local resources. Severely understaffed and short on food, the British prioritized the quick removal of these military groups to stabilize the region. A border crisis worsened the situation when Yugoslav forces crossed into Carinthia to claim territory; an armed conflict with an erstwhile ally seemed imminent. The British viewed the swift removal of the Cossacks as a security measure and as a means to ensure military readiness. Simultaneously, the Soviet Union still held tens of thousands of Western prisoners of war. The need to secure their continued safe return pressured British commanders to comply with Soviet repatriation demands. Any humanitarian concerns gave way to expediency.

=== Repatriation ===
The Allies forcibly repatriated Cossack collaborators and their families to the Soviet Union under agreements from the Yalta Conference. These actions occurred during May and June 1945, though a broader repatriation network across Germany, the UK, Italy, and the USA continued until 1947. In Austria, the operation transferred 45,000 to 50,000 Cossacks to the Soviet Union. Most belonged to the XV SS Cossack Cavalry Corps or the Kazachi Stan, which had served as armed units of the Nazi occupation. Having designated the Cossack formations as "Soviet nationals", British commanders used a rapid repatriation protocol without screening the population. This resulted in the wrongful deportation of 3,000 non-Soviet "old émigrés" and violated the citizenship parameters of the Yalta Agreement.

The repatriation of 32,000 Kazachi Stan personnel from the Lienz-Peggetz camps relied on deception and force. British officers initially allowed Cossacks to retain internal policing weapons to lower their guard. On 28 May 1945, the British removed the leadership cadre. They told 1,800 Cossack officers and staff to leave the camp for an administrative conference. As the Cossacks believed that the claimed meeting would settle their refugee status and future Allied employment, they complied. Instead, trucks carried the officers directly to a guarded transit camp at Spittal an der Drau. On 1 June 1945, British troops arrived to clear the remaining civilians and soldiers. Amidst passive resistance, the British had to employ force, generating panic, melees, and numerous injuries. The camp clearings were more orderly on 2 and 3 June. There were instances of suicide and fatal injuries on the first day; British military records list 9 total deaths, while the Cossack cemetery at Lienz has 28 graves. British troops ran sweeps over the next two weeks, delivering about 2,000 of those who evaded the earlier transports to Judenburg.

Initially, British troops did not guard the 18,000 to 20,000 combatants of the XV SS Cossack Cavalry Corps, but merely told them to stay within certain boundaries. On 15 May, British officers informed the senior commanders that the corps would likely be repatriated to the Soviet Union. Many German officers took the opportunity to desert at that time; Pannwitz and the remainder of his staff chose to stay behind. On 26 May, British soldiers arrested Pannwitz and his staff and placed them under guard. The next day, the British military moved the rest of the corps to a high-security camp at Weitensfeld to prepare for the transfers. Officers hid the ultimate destination from the Cossacks, so the soldiers boarded the Weitensfeld-bound trucks peacefully. Over the next few days, British transports delivered the men, including Pannwitz, to Judenburg and handed them over to the Red Army.

Smaller repatriations took place between 1945 and 1947. In the United Kingdom, British authorities utilized a military camp in Surrey between late May and early June 1945 to isolate and deport captured Cossack personnel. In US-occupied Bavaria, military authorities conducted an operation at Kempten Camp on 12 August 1945, using physical force to breach a barricaded Orthodox church. The action resulted in the deportation of 410 individuals, including Cossacks of the Kazachi Stan, after suppressing instances of suicide. This was followed by a pre-dawn operation on 24 February 1946 at the Plattling Displaced Persons Camp, where US military police overcame physical resistance to deport 1,500 to 2,000 troops of the XV SS Corps. The program concluded with Operation Keelhaul between August 1946 and May 1947, which used individualized screenings to hand over roughly 1,000 remaining military collaborators across Italy and Austria, some of them Cossacks.

== Aftermath ==
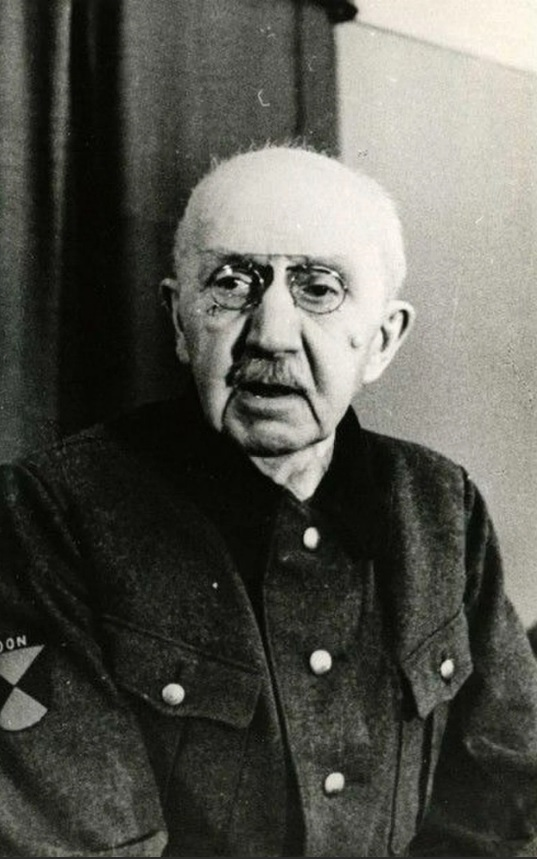
Pyotr Krasnov during trial, 1947

=== Trial of senior leadership ===
Following their delivery into Soviet custody, SMERSH segregated the senior Cossack leadership and transported them to Moscow's Lubyanka and Lefortovo prisons. The six defendants were charged with war crimes, collaboration, high treason, and espionage against the Soviet state under Ukaz 39 and Article 58 of the Soviet penal code. They were:

- General Pyotr Krasnov, Head of the Main Administration of Cossack Forces
- General Andrei Shkuro, commander of the Cossack Reserve (Kosaken-Reserve) of the SS Main Office
- Lieutenant General Helmuth von Pannwitz, commander of the XV SS Cossack Cavalry Corps
- Major General Timofey Domanov, commander of the Kazachi Stan militia
- Major General Sultan Klych-Girey, commander of the Caucasian Volunteer Cavalry Division
- Major General Semyon Krasnov, Chief of Staff of the Main Administration of Cossack Forces.

The Military Collegium of the Supreme Court of the USSR conducted the closed trial on January 15–16, 1947. Judges found the defendants guilty and sentenced them to death. The sentence was final. The prisoners were hanged together in the courtyard of Lefortovo Prison on the evening of January 16, 1947.

=== The fighting force and civilians ===
Following the handovers at Lienz and Judenburg, NKVD and SMERSH officers processed the rank-and-file soldiers and civilian dependents through a network of filtration camps. Vetting teams ran background checks cross-referenced with captured German records. This process separated voluntary personnel from mobilized conscripts and civilian dependents.

The Soviet state designated the Cossacks as traitors and military collaborators. The higher ranked officers were sentenced under Article 58. According to survivor testimony, some officers faced execution squads before they reached the Soviet border. The rank and file, under the simplified post-war procedures, were processed administratively and received sentences of 6 to 10 years in the Gulag or "special settlements". The prisoners went to mining and timber camps in Siberia, the Urals, and the Far North. Thousands perished from malnutrition, disease, and extreme weather. The authorities permitted most civilian women and children to settle in exile zones under police surveillance. A general amnesty freed the survivors in 1955.

=== Diaspora ===
A minority of Cossacks and civilian dependents evaded the forced repatriations, blending into the chaotic landscape of post-war Western Europe. The escapees falsified their identities and obtained temporary identity cards. They hid in displaced persons camps as Polish or Baltic citizens or non-Soviet "old émigrés" who had fled Russia after the Civil War. In mid-June 1945, the Red Cross took over the administration of the south Austria camps from the military. They implemented individualized screening that exempted about 2,000 Cossacks from repatriation as non-Soviet citizens.

Over the next decades, the majority migrated via the "ratlines" and regular immigration pipelines to Australia and North and South America where they established anti-communist diaspora communities. Among the prominent figures who avoided repatriation was Vyacheslav Naumenko who surrendered separately to the US forces in Bavaria, avoided the handovers as a non-Soviet citizen, and emigrated to the US. Ivan Kononov, by then the nominal leader of all KONR Cossack forces, abandoned his command, crossed into the US occupation zone, and later emigrated to Australia under a false identity.

== Legacy ==
=== Historical negationism ===
External image
- "British betrayal of the Cossacks", painting by Sergey Korolkov, housed by the Museum of Cossack History, New Jersey

In the decades following World War II, surviving Cossack leaders and diaspora advocates rewrote their wartime history. They systematically uncoupled their legacy from Nazi atrocities. Sanitized publications heavily propelled this revisionist narrative. Kuban Ataman Vyacheslav Naumenko’s text, The Great Betrayal, served as the foundation for the effort. The book refocused historical memory entirely on the tragedy of the Lienz handovers. However, Naumenko completely omitted the leadership's integration into the Wehrmacht and Waffen-SS security apparatus. Émigré periodicals and memoirs, aided by Western supporters, further institutionalized this myth. These texts routinely whitewashed the XV SS Cossack Cavalry Corps portraying them as part of a noble crusade against Bolshevism. The narrative hid documented war crimes against civilian populations. It reclassified scorched-earth counter-insurgency operations in Belarus and Yugoslavia as conventional frontline combat against the "communist scourge". In that, these efforts were successful.

Cossack apologists and diaspora organizations promoted the concept of "Western betrayal", with the events surrounding the repatriation often referred to in émigré literature as the "Great Betrayal" or the betrayal of "Lienz Cossacks". By adopting this vocabulary, early émigré literature conflated the legal and diplomatic grievances of occupied sovereign nations with the status of defeated Axis military units. Following the late 1940s, this narrative was integrated directly into the broader geopolitics of the Cold War. It successfully warped mainstream Western perception for decades and transforming a complex regional logistical and military crisis into a simplified, dramatic tale of Western moral bankruptcy and institutional conspiracy.

=== Attempts at state rehabilitation ===
This historical negationism eventually transitioned into aggressive political and legal campaigns aimed at formal state rehabilitation following the collapse of the Soviet Union. During the 1990s, nationalist and neo-Cossack revivalist groups in Russia unsuccessfully campaigned for a rehabilitation of the Cossack collaborationist leadership. A request by General Helmuth von Pannwitz' granddaughter was more successful; it resulted in a military prosecutor's office issuing a highly controversial rehabilitation order for Pannwitz in 1996. This political campaign faced domestic backlash and ultimately failed: higher Russian military courts formally rescinded the Pannwitz order and reaffirmed the 1947 death sentence in 2001.

=== Commemoration ===
External image
- Krasnov statue at the Yelansky Cossack Museum and Memorial Complex. It was dismantled in 2025.

A private Yelansky Cossack Museum and Memorial Complex in the stanitsa (village) of Yelanskaya, Rostov Oblast housed a statue of Pyotr Krasnov among other, non-problematic Don Cossack historical figures. Protests against the statue began as soon as it was unveiled in 2006 leading to Krasnov's name being removed from the monument in 2016. The statue was then supposed to symbolize a generic "Ataman". Petitions and protests continued until a court decision in 2019 concluded that the monument "contained elements of rehabilitation and promotion of fascist symbols". In 2025, following a protracted court battle, the statue was dismantled and removed.

A memorial plaque installed in 1994 at the All-Saints Church near the Sokol Metro station faced repeated vandalism and calls for removal. It honored executed leaders like Pyotr Krasnov and Andrei Shkuro alongside traditional Russian heroes.

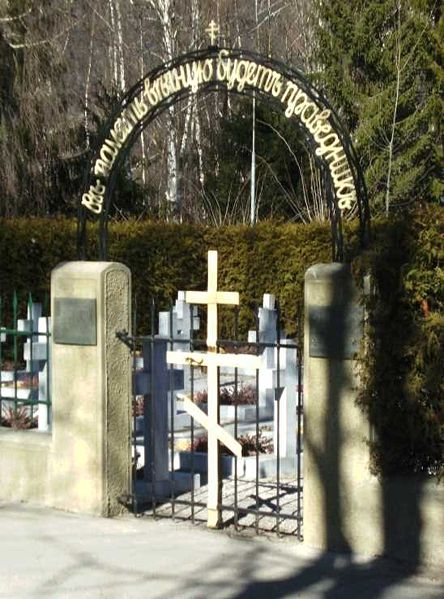
Cossack cemetery in Lienz-Peggetz

In Lienz, Austria, there is a dedicated Cossack cemetery containing a stone memorial obelisk and 28 mass graves that commemorate the "Tragedy of the Drau" (Drava). These collective plots hold the remains of roughly 300 mostly unknown victims who died during the forced repatriations.

In the town of Tristach, Austria, there was a memorial commemorating Pannwitz and the troops of the XV SS Cossack Cavalry Corps who were killed in action or died as POWs. This memorial was removed in September 2021 because of the connection between Pannwitz and both the SA and the SS, as well as his loyalty to the Nazi regime.

A London memorial,Twelve Responses to Tragedy, is located in the Yalta Memorial Garden at Cromwell Gardens near the Victoria & Albert Museum. Dedicated in 1982, this bronze sculpture by Angela Conner commemorates the individuals forcibly repatriated by the Western Allies to Soviet and Yugoslav authorities. The memorial was approved by Prime Minister Margaret Thatcher in May 1980, over the objections of the Foreign Office who opposed the erection on land that belonged to the Crown Estate of a monument that implicitly criticized the past actions of the British government.
