= Timofey Domanov =

Russian collaborator with Nazi Germany

- Тимофей Николаевич Доманов
- Born: February 15, 1887; Don Host Oblast, Russian Empire
- Died: January 16, 1947 (aged 59); Moscow, Soviet Union
- Military career
- Allegiance: Russian Empire (to 1917); White Movement (1917–1920); Nazi Germany (1942–1945)
- Branch: Imperial Russian Army; White Army; Wehrmacht
- Service years: 1914–1920; 1942–1945
- Rank: Major General (Wehrmacht); Field Ataman (Kazachi Stan)
- Commands: Kazachi Stan (1944–1945)
- Conflicts: World War I Russian Civil War; World War II: Operation Ataman; Occupation of Carnia; Battle of Ovaro
- Criminal information
- Cause of death: Execution by hanging
- Conviction: Treason
- Penalty: Death

Timofey Nikolayevich Domanov Тимофей Николаевич Доманов (1887–1947) was a Don Cossack officer and major collaborationist military commander who served as the final Field Ataman of the Kazachi Stan under German sponsorship during World War II. Handed over to the Soviet Union, as part of the repatriation of Cossacks after World War II, he was tried for treason and war crimes and executed in 1947.

== Biography ==
Born in the Don Host Oblast of the Russian Empire, Domanov served as an ensign in the Imperial Russian Army during World War I and subsequently fought against the Bolsheviks in the White Movement during the Russian Civil War. Following the defeat of the White armies, he remained inside the Soviet Union under an assumed identity, working as a clerk and accountant, but was arrested by the NKVD in 1934 for his anti-Soviet past and recruited as an informant. When the German Wehrmacht invaded the North Caucasus in the summer of 1942 during Fall Blau, Domanov immediately defected, offering his services to the occupying Axis authorities and organizing volunteer collaborationist Cossack militias in the Pyatigorsk region to fight the Soviet government.

Following the death of Colonel Sergei Pavlov in June 1944, Domanov was promoted to Major General by the German command and assumed supreme leadership over the Kazachi Stan, a massive mobile community of fleeing collaborators and their families. Under a strategic directive issued by SS and Police Leader Odilo Globocnik known as Operation Ataman, Domanov oversaw the transport of about 30,000 Cossacks to the alpine sub-region of Carnia in northeastern Italy. There, he directed ruthless counter-insurgency operations and scorched-earth pacification campaigns to dismantle the partisan "Republic of Carnia" and establish Kosakenland in Norditalien, a collaborationist puppet territory where families were forcibly billeted in requisitioned Italian homes. Domanov managed this territory with a rigid internal discipline enforced by his own military courts, maintaining the local occupation until the Allied spring offensive forced him to execute a rearguard fighting retreat over the Plöcken Pass into Austria in May 1945.

Believing that the Western Allies would preserve his combat-tested forces for an imminent war against the Soviet Union, Domanov surrendered the Kazachi Stan to the British 8th Army in Lienz, Austria. He was subsequently targeted by the Spittal an der Drau officer selections on May 28, 1945, where British forces used a deceptive military conference ruse to separate the entire Cossack leadership from their rank-and-file troops and civilian families. Domanov and his staff were immediately detained and handed over directly to the Soviet SMERSH at the Judenburg border checkpoint. Transported to Moscow, Domanov was imprisoned at the Lubyanka Prison and tried alongside General Pyotr Krasnov for high treason, espionage, and terrorist activities against the Soviet state; he was found guilty by the Military Collegium of the Supreme Court of the Soviet Union and executed by hanging on January 16, 1947.
