= Sultan Klych-Girey =

Russian Circassian general (1880–1947)

- СултIан Къылыщджэрый
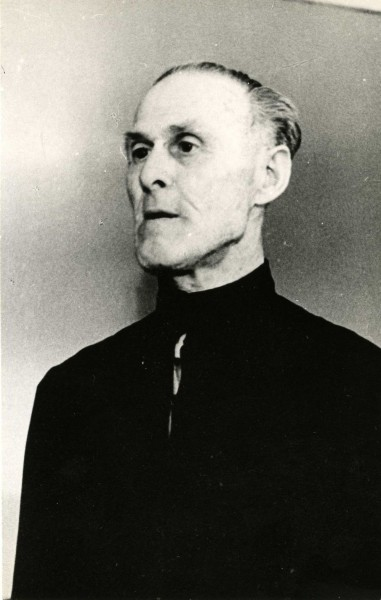
- Klych-Girey at the Military Collegium of the Supreme Court of the Soviet Union, 1947
- Born: 15 March 1880; Maykop or Ulyap, Russian Empire
- Died: 17 January 1947 (aged 66); Lefortovo Prison, Moscow, Russian SFSR, Soviet Union
- Cause of death: Execution by hanging
- Relatives: Giray dynasty
- Military career
- Allegiance: Russian Empire; Mountainous Republic of the Northern Caucasus; (Russia) White movement; Nazi Germany; Kosakenland
- Service years: 1897–1920; 1941–1945
- Rank: Major general
- Units: Caucasian Native Cavalry Division; Volunteer Army; Kosakenlager
- Commands: North Caucasian and Mountain-Caucasian legions
- Conflicts: Russian Revolution of 1905; World War I; Kornilov affair; Russian Civil War; Ice March; Evacuation of the Crimea; World War II; World War II in Yugoslavia; Battle of the Caucasus; Italian campaign

Sultan Shakhanovich Klych-Girey (Russian: Султа́н Шаха́нович Клыч-Гире́й; Adyghe: СултIан Къылыщджэрый; 15 March 1880 – 17 January 1947) was a Russian and Circassian general of Crimean Tatar descent. A career military officer, Klych-Girey participated in the suppression of Russian Revolution of 1905, fought in World War I and the Russian Civil War for the Russian Empire and White movement before becoming a supporter of Circassian nationalism as a White émigré. During World War II, he collaborated with Nazi Germany and served in Cossack collaborationist units. Captured by British forces in 1945, he was forcibly repatriated to the Soviet Union and subsequently tried in Moscow for high treason and executed.

== Early life and career ==
Sultan Shakhanovich Klych-Girey was born in the city of Maykop or the aul of Ulyap, in what is presently the Russian republic of Adygea. He was a descendant of the Giray dynasty, and through the Giray dynasty a Genghisid via Jochi. After receiving an education at the Lutheran Gymnasium in Saint Petersburg, he joined the Imperial Russian Army in 1897 and joined the Yelisavetgrad Cavalry Cadet School, from which he graduated in 1901.

Klych-Girey participated in the government crackdown on the Russian Revolution of 1905, and was serving in the Caucasian Native Cavalry Division when World War I began. During the Russian occupation of Zalishchyky, he suffered from shell shock, but he was not dismissed from service. In 1916 he was promoted to colonel.

== Russian Civil War ==
Following the signing of the Treaty of Brest-Litovsk and Russia's withdrawal from World War I, Klych-Girey returned to the Caucasus. There, he participated in the defence of the Maykopsky otdel against the Red Army by North Caucasians before joining the White movement. On 25 March 1918, he was promoted to major general and commanded the Circassian Cavalry Regiment (though true power allegedly rested with Sultan Adil-Girey, a colonel serving in the unit).

After the evacuation of the Crimea, Klych-Girey was instructed by Pyotr Wrangel to travel to Karachay and organise "white-green" resistance to Soviet rule. Klych-Girey proceeded to organise a resistance movement in the region, but was soon defeated by the Red Army and forced to flee to the Democratic Republic of Georgia.

== Exile ==
After the Red Army invasion of Georgia, Klych-Girey fled the Caucasus to live abroad. In exile, Klych-Girey became a supporter of Pan-Caucasianism, and was active in the movement among White émigrés. He was a leader of both the People's Party of Highlanders of the North Caucasus, which supported an independent pan-Caucasian state in the North Caucasus, and the Caucasian National Committee, which also included Georgia, Armenia, and Azerbaijan in its proposals for a pan-Caucasian nation.

== World War II collaboration ==
When Operation Barbarossa began in 1941, Klych-Girey began working with the government of Nazi Germany to organise North Caucasian prisoners of war into military units within the Wehrmacht. He began by participating in anti-partisan reprisals in occupied Yugoslavia before shifting his focus to the North Caucasus after German troops entered the region in 1942. Klych-Girey spoke to Circassian audiences living under occupation, calling on them to support what he called a "war of liberation". Klych-Girey's North Caucasian and Mountain-Caucasian legions were subordinated to the Cossack collaborators of Kazachi Stan commanded by Don Cossack ataman Pyotr Krasnov. According to a report from Soviet MGB director Viktor Abakumov to Joseph Stalin in 1947, he also participated in the crackdown on partisans and Communist Party of the Soviet Union members in areas under German control.

In 1943, with the defeat of German forces in the North Caucasus, Klych-Girey's forces retreated with the Germans. In 1944, they were transferred to Italy, where Kazachi Stan was tasked with combatting the Italian resistance. In May 1945, together with Kazachi Stan, they retreated into Austria, surrendering to the British forces.

Klych-Girey acted as the leader of the North Caucasian camp in the Drau river valley near Lienz, Austria, which housed thousands of former combatants and accompanying civilians. Despite the growing anxiety among the refugees about forced repatriation, Klych-Girey attempted to calm the camp, stated that Western democracies would not surrender them to the Soviet Union.

== Repatriation, trial, and execution ==
On May 28, 1945, during the forced repatriation of the Cossacks, the British military administration separated Klych-Girey and approximately 150 other Caucasian leaders from the main camp under the guise of a conference in Spittal. They were instead placed in a barbed-wire enclosure and handed over to Soviet authorities the following dawn. On 29 May 1945, along with other collaborationist military personnel from the Caucasus, he was transported to Judenburg and handed over to the Red Army. In the Soviet Union, Klych-Girey was placed on trial, alongside other military personnel who had worked alongside Krasnov. During the trial, he was found guilty of treason, counter-revolutionary activities, and terrorism, and executed on 17 January 1947.

== See also ==
- Bibliography of the Russian Revolution and Civil War
- Outline of the Russian Revolution and Civil War
- Index of articles related to the Russian Revolution and Civil War
