= Warrior caste =

== Historical ==
- Cossacks, Russian and Ukrainian social estate under the Russian Tsars
- Eight Banners, a military and administrative in Later Jin and Qing dynasties of China that organized Manchu households for military purposes
- Equites, Roman knights
- Eso Ikoyi, war chiefs amongst the Yoruba people
- Gallowglass, medieval Norse-Gaelic mercenaries
- Gurkhas, soldiers from the area of Nepal
- Jaguar warriors, an Aztec military élite
- Janissary, a member of a class of soldiers in the Ottoman Empire
- Knights, in their role as the apex fighting force of the Age of Chivalry
- Kshatriya, members of the military or reigning order, the second-ranking caste of the Indian varna system
- Maryannu, chariot-mounted nobility in the ancient Middle East
- Samoa's Toa class in the Fa'amatai system, which used a warrior code known as fa'aaloalo (respect) that is still in existence today
- Samurai, the warrior class in Japan
- Spartiate, the warrior-citizen body of ancient Sparta
- Streltsy, Muscovite/Russian military class

== Fictional ==
- Minbari Warrior Caste, in the fictional Babylon 5 universe, the Warrior Caste is one of three castes in Minbari society

== See also ==
- Caste
- Social class
- Social stratification
- Warrior
