= Kazachi Stan =

- Казачий Стан
- Active: 1943 – 1945
- Disbanded: Forced repatriation to the Soviet Union (June 1945)
- Country: Nazi Germany
- Branch: Wehrmacht; SS and Police Command (via OZAK / Globocnik)
- Type: Cossack volunteers / Militia
- Role: Nazi security warfare, occupational garrison, settler colonialism
- Size: Total Population: ~32,000 (May 1945); Combat Strength: ~9,000 active militia troops; ~9,000 troops of Kosaken-Reserve
- Part of: Autonomous Cossack Council (Subordinate to German military administration and Cossack Central Office)
- Garrison/HQ: Novocherkassk, USSR (1943); Novogrudok, Belarus (1944); Tolmezzo, Italy (1944–1945)
- Patron: Alfred Rosenberg; Odilo Globocnik
- Engagements: Eastern Front Retreat (1943–1944); Operation Ataman (1944); Occupation of Carnia (1944–1945); Battle of Ovaro (1945)

Commanders
- Notable commanders: Ataman Sergei Pavlov (Cossack leader) (d. 1944); Ataman Timofey Domanov (executed); General Pyotr Krasnov (executed) (Political & Supreme Advisor)

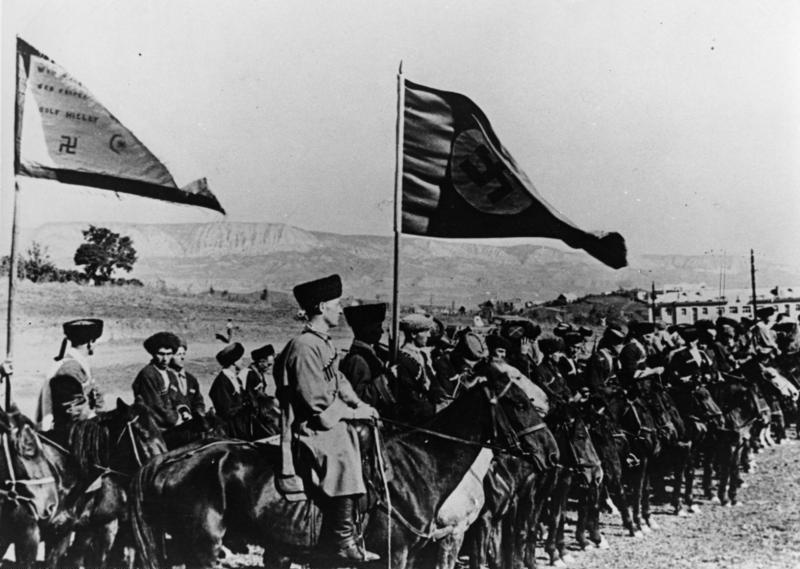
Cossack troops in the Wehrmacht, occupied Soviet Union, 1942

The Kazachi Stan (Kosakenlager, Казачий Стан, lit. 'Cossack Encampment') was a massive, mobile encampment and a combat formation composed of Cossacks who collaborated with Nazi Germany during World War II.

The entity had its origins in volunteer regional militias organized under local Atamans who chose to collaborate with occupying German forces following the Wehrmacht's advance into Southern Russia and the North Caucasus in the summer of 1942 (Fall Blau). When the Germans was forced to retreat after the defeat at Stalingrad in early 1943, a massive civilian exodus occurred; fearing Soviet retribution, the Cossack collaborators and their families chose to follow the Germans. Retreating westward alongside Axis forces across Ukraine, Belarus, and Poland, the Kazachi Stan evolved into a unique, self-contained nomadic community that managed its own schools, judicial tribunals, and religious infrastructure.

At formation in 1943, Kazachi Stan stood at 14,000, both civilians and armed collaborators and was led by Ataman Sergei Pavlov (Cossack leader). By the time Kazachi Stan arrived in Belarus in the spring of 1944, it counted about 25,000. At its peak in the spring of 1945, the community comprised an overall population of approximately 32,000 individuals, including an integrated fighting force of roughly 9,000 active militia troops, augmented by 9,000 troops of the Kosaken-Reserve. From 1944, it was commanded by Ataman Timofey Domanov, with White émigré general Pyotr Krasnov, head of Cossack Central Office at the Reich Ministry for the Occupied Eastern Territories, acting as a political advisor.

In July 1944, under a strategic directive issued by SS and Police Leader Odilo Globocnik known as Operation Ataman, the Kazachi Stan was transferred via 50 military trains to the alpine region of Carnia in northeastern Italy. There, they violently dismantled local Italian partisan resistance forces and established an autonomous puppet state named Kosakenland in Norditalien, forcibly billeting their families in requisitioned Italian homes to secure vital Wehrmacht supply corridors. Following the final Axis collapse and a fighting retreat over the Plöcken Pass in May 1945, the entire community surrendered to the British Army in Lienz, Austria. Despite British pretend assurances, the British V Corps executed a blanket transfer in June 1945, forcibly handing the population over to the Soviet NKVD, which resulted in a panicked stampede, widespread suicides, and decades of penal labor in the Gulag system. Cossack leadership was tried for treason and executed.
