= Brigate Osoppo =

- Active: 24 December 1943 – 1945
- Country: Kingdom of Italy
- Type: Partisan brigade
- Role: Guerilla warfare
- Mottos: Pai nestris fogolârs (For our homes)
- Engagements: World War II: Italian Civil War

Commanders
- Current commander: Candido Grassi "Verdi"; Manlio Cencig "Mario"; Ascanio De Luca "Aurelio"; Francesco De Gregori "Bolla"; Aldo Bricco "Centina"

The Brigate Osoppo-Friuli or Osoppo-Friuli Brigades were autonomous partisan formations founded in the headquarter of the Archbishop Seminary of Udine on 24 December 1943 by partisan volunteers of mixed ideologies, already active in Carnia and Friuli before the Badoglio Proclamation of 8 September. The partisans in this brigade adhered to various and often conflicting ideologies, including both secularism and Catholicism, as well as socialism and liberalism.

The Osoppo aimed to cooperate independently with the communist Garibaldi Brigades and to contribute to the antifascist fight against the occupying German forces. The latter had in fact established the Operational Zone of the Adriatic Littoral, subtracting the whole territory of Friuli-Venezia Giulia from the authority of the Italian Social Republic and establishing an harsh regime of repression and dispossession, availing of the Waffen-SS formations, cossacks and fascist republican forces.

This autonomous partisan group was led by Candido Grassi (battle name "Verdi"), Manlio Cencig (battle name "Mario"), two captains of the Royal Italian Army and Don Ascanio De Luca (already chaplain of Alpini in Montenegro and parson of Colugna, Tavagnacco, at the time).

Because of the complex political-military situation of the Friulian territory and Julian March, at the middle of opposite nationalisms and secular ethnic and territorial conflicts, the Osoppo Brigades had often conflictual relationships with Garibaldi formations and they were in contrast with Slovenian-Yugoslav partisan forces.

The name "Osoppo" was a symbolic reference with the history of the region during the Italian unification, when in 1848 the city of Osoppo resisted for seven months against the Austrian troops.

== Eastern regions after the 8 September ==
=== Dissolution of the Italian state ===
After the 8 September, the Italian divisions of the 2ª Armata, already involved in an harsh repression and anti-guerrilla struggle in Slovenia against the Yugoslav partisan units and the indigenous population, broke up. In Trieste and Gorizia, general Alberto Ferrero left the command without any order. In Fiume general Gastone Gambara (commander of the 11º Corpo d'armata) waited until 11 September, when he was reached by the first German divisions who were quickly occupying Istria and he gave them the command. The same happened in Pula. The dissolution of many divisions and the lack of orders led to the deliver of more than 100,000 Italian soldiers deployed in the area to the Germans without any chance to draft a resistance plan. The German occupation did not extended immediately to the whole region and, after the dissolution of the Italian administration, the Yugoslav formations, already located and active in the lands on the border since 1941, took initiative.

The situation was particularly confused: beside the Italian disbanded troops left alone without orders and the coming German divisions, the 9th Corps of the 4th Yugoslav Army penetrated in the area shortly after the 8 September with more than 50,000 soldiers who crossed the Julian Alps and advanced through Karst Plateau and Istria, pointing towards Gorizia, Trieste, Pula and Fiume. Moreover, since the second half of 1941, in the provinces of Gorizia, Pula, Fiume and Trieste there was already an increasing partisan activity of guerrilla-warfare and sabotage by Slovenian resistance groups. The Yugoslav formations, kindled by a strong nationalism and by a spirit of vengeance after the occupation and the harsh repression and the Italianization on the eastern border and in Yugoslavia, did violent retaliations against the Italian minority and those considered as nationalists or fascists.

The merciless attitude of Italian troops and commands during the two years of occupation in Slovenia, Croatia and Montenegro, characterized by harsh repressive measures and a high number of killings, devastations and deportations, provoked a violent Slav nationalist reaction at the arrival of the partisans in the Italian territory. Yugoslav formations, often supported by the local Slav population, began to arrest many Italian citizens on the charge of being fascists, but actually there was no distinction among the Italians who were generally considered as "enemies of the people". Arrests were concentrated in Pisino and, after a brief trial, prisoners were shot and threw into the Karst carves. This event, known as Foibe massacres, occurred in September 1943 and led to the death of more than a thousand of Italians, before the conclusion of a precarious agreement of antifascist collaboration between Italian Garibaldi Brigades and Yugoslav partisans.

=== Operational Zone of the Adriatic Littoral and repression ===
According to the Operation Achse as wanted by Hitler and German commanders, the province of Udine and the whole Venezia Giulia were immediately included into the Operational Zone of the Adriatic Littoral, with the original name used during the domination of the Habsburg monarchy and the clear cancellation of what Italy obtained after the World War I. Those regions were put under the leadership of Carinthian Friedrich Rainer, appointed as High Commissar with full powers, in anticipation of the formal annexation of the region into the Third Reich. In his diaries, Joseph Goebbels talks about annexation project not only for the Adriatic Littoral but even also for the whole Veneto, in order to exploit it as a "tourist attraction area" for the German "master race". On 10 September 1943, provinces of Bolzano, Belluno and Trento were unified into the "Voralpenland" while the territory comprising Udine, Gorizia, Trieste, Pola, Fiume and Ljubljiana was officially established as Adriatisches Kustenland in October, after the completion of the territorial occupation by the German armed forces between 9 September and 12 October.

On 2 October 1943, German troops went to the offensive and launched the Operation Wolkenbruch ("Cloudburst") with three SS divisions and two infantry divisions that repelled the 9th Corps and destroyed the houses used by Yugoslavs as support bases; the operation ended with the German victory on 15 October 1943. On 1 October 1943, Germans established the Operational Zone of the Adriatic Littoral, (OZAL) administrated by Supreme Commissar Friedrich Rainer to whom was flanked for the repression by SSGruppenführer Odilo Globočnik, previously the coordinator of German extermination camps in Poland.

On 9 October 1943, the Julian provinces (Gorizia, Trieste, Pola, Fiume), as well as Friuli, were merged into the OZAL and subordinated to the German military administration, subtracting them from the Italian Social Republic (RSI).

The policy of German authorities in the Adriatisches Kustenland, ruled by Rainer with dictatorial powers, included the ouster of the political-administrative influence of the RSI, the planning and actuation of measures for a subsequent annexation to the Reich, the economic exploitation, the repression of dissent and anti-fascist partisan struggle. In Carnia, German authorities established even the Cossacks of Don and Kuban led by general Krasnov and prince Zulikize, who created commands in Verzegnis and Paluzza and organized wide plunders and devastations, collaborating into the massive repression of partisans.

Political authorities and military divisions of RSI participated to the repression and the fight against the Resistance formations: divisions of X MAS initially manifested unrealistic anti-Slavic defence purposes on the borderlands but then they ended (completely ousted by Rainer, who did not tolerate any fascist "interference" in the territories he administered) to dedicate themselves in the repression of Garibaldi and Osoppo Brigades, while some members of the republican police, like Gaetano Collotti and Giuseppe Gueli, organized in Trieste violent and aggressive police apparatus against partisans and their supporters.

== Resistance forces and creation of Osoppo Brigades ==
=== Born of the Resistance in Friuli and Julian March ===
The first partisan formations were formed near Udine against the Nazi government (characterized by inter-ethnic hatreds, spirit of vengeance, opposite nationalisms and ideological extremes, repressions, internments and roundups) collaborationist RSI, with the autonomists of Mario Cencigh, communists of Giacinto Calligaris and Mario Lizzero, militants of the Action Party led by Fermo Solari. In Venezia Giulia there were the Brigata Proletaria ("Proletarian Brigade", destroyed in Gorizia by Germans) and other communist formations were created in Tarnova, Trieste and Istria.

The two main groups of Resistance in those regions were the communists, from the working class of Eastern Veneto, and the rural populations and bourgeois, firmly anchored to the Catholic Church, both united by the anti-German hate but divided by ideologies, while the socialist and Action formations were particularly weak. On November–December 1943, the Osoppo Brigades were formed with the merger between the Socialist and Action formations with the Catholic ones.

=== Organization ===
The purpose of Osoppo Brigades, in which converged also the Giustizia e Libertà formations located in the region, was to fight against Germans and Fascists for a Democratic state within the Resistance, trying to keep an active collaboration with the Garibaldi communist units and protecting moreover the interests of the Italian population of Friuli and Venezia Giulia facing Yugoslav partisan forces. The Cappello Alpino and a green handkerchief were chosen as recognition signs.

The brigade was named after the small town of Osoppo which resisted an Austrian siege which lasted 168 days in 1848.

The group decided to be autonomous on the operative field, as requested by the non-communist members during the NLC session of 25 November 1943. The Osoppo accepted instead the political direction of NLC of Udine, refused by the Garibaldi Brigades.

== 1944 and the Republic of Carnia ==
In the spring of 1944, the Brigata Osoppo, with the command headquartered in the Castello Ceconi of Pielungo (comune of Vito d'Asio), was formed by seven battalions led by Candido Grassi with Don Ascanio De Luca as political commissar. Battalions were dislocated as follows:

- Two in Carnia ("Carnia", "Tagliamento")
- Two in Carnic Prealps ("Italia D.D.", "Piave")
- Three in Julian Prealps ("Julio", "Torre", "Udine")

On 19 July 1944, the headquarter of Pielungo was put on fire by Germans and a situation of instability occurred in the command after divergences between militants of Giustizia e Libertà and the other Osoppo members.

On 21 August 1944, the Osoppo Brigade was reformed into five brigades between Carnia, Carnic and Julian Prealps and the plain.

=== Garibaldi-Osoppo Unified Commands ===
The Osoppo Brigades were coordinate, for a brief period of 1944, by the Unified Divisional Military Commands to the Garibaldi Brigades (Comandi Militari unificati di Divisione alle Brigate Garibaldine), despite having still the organizational autonomy. At the end of July, a coordination command was formed between the Osoppo of Sinistra Tagliamento and the Natisone Garibaldi Brigade. In Destra Tagliamento, instead, the Osoppo Garibaldi was formed at the end of August from the "Ippolito Nievo" unified divisions of plain and mountain while the 2ª divisione Osoppo Territoriale was created in September. The Unified Command was solicited also by the Allies, who did not want any political issues as hinder to the fight against nazis; despite difficulties caused by ideological differences, the Unified Command was efficient in the brief experience of the Free Republic of Carnia (August–September 1944).

=== Republic of Carnia ===
Despite contrasts, the Unified Command was established, with the bond of unanimity decisions, in a free zone of Sinistra Tagliamento and Collio, formed by Garibaldi Mario Fantini "Sasso" (Commander) and Giovanni Padoan "Vanni" (Political commissar) of Garibaldi Brigades, together with Francesco De Gregori (Deputy commander) and Alfredo Berzanti (Deputy commissar) of Osoppo.

From August to September 1944 the Osoppo Division took part with the Friuli Garibaldi Division to the liberation of Carnia and the establishment of a "partisan republic"; after conflicts and little battles, partisan (almost 3,500 men) occupied a zone of 2,500 km^{2} with 78,900 inhabitants and 37 comuni. The council of the Free Republic of Carnia was established on 26 September in Ampezzo and tried to develop projects regarding administration, economy, justice and education. In the defence field, contrasts between Osoppo and Garibaldi Brigades of Carnia and Friuli did not allow instead the formation of a unified command.

The following repression conducted by over 40,000 men, between Germans, Social Republicans, X MAS, ethnic formations and cossacks, dismantled the Carnia Republic and caused heavy losses to defenders and civil population; nazi-fascist forces devastated the territory, made roundups and deportations; a formation of Osoppo was decimated along with the Garibaldi Brigades, but on 27 November, a chosen Osoppo group was still able to repeal an attack of German mountain troops. After new clashes in a harsh and inhospitable territory, the Osoppo Commander Candido Grassi ("Verdi") ordered the conversion of his troops into plain formations who succeeded to pass through the enemy side and take refuge into the plain.

== 1945 and contrasts between Osoppo and Garibaldi partisans ==
The Gruppo Brigata Osoppo dell'Est (Group of East Osoppo Brigade), a unified command with the Divisione Garibaldi Natisone, did not accept to pass east of the Isonzo river and to be subordinated to the Slovenian 9th Corps of the National Liberation Army of Yugoslavia led by Josip Broz Tito. On 22 November 1944, the Italian Communist Party (and not the CLNAI, the only command allowed to give orders legitimately regarding the operative deployment of partisan forces) ordered to the Italian partisans located in the zone to pass under the dependence of the Yugoslav 9th Corps in order to create (according to Palmiro Togliatti in a letter to Vincenzo Bianco, PCI representative in the 9th Corps):

A completely different condition from the one existing in the free part of Italy. In conclusion, a democratic situation will be created.

— Palmiro Togliatti

The disposition provided that "all the Italian units of the zone [the Friulian Adriatic Littoral] must operate only under the command of the 9th Army Corps of Tito", adding that whoever refused this order would be considered as fascist and imperialist; the command of Osoppo Brigades repealed the requested saying pai nostris fogolârs in Friulan ("For our homes").

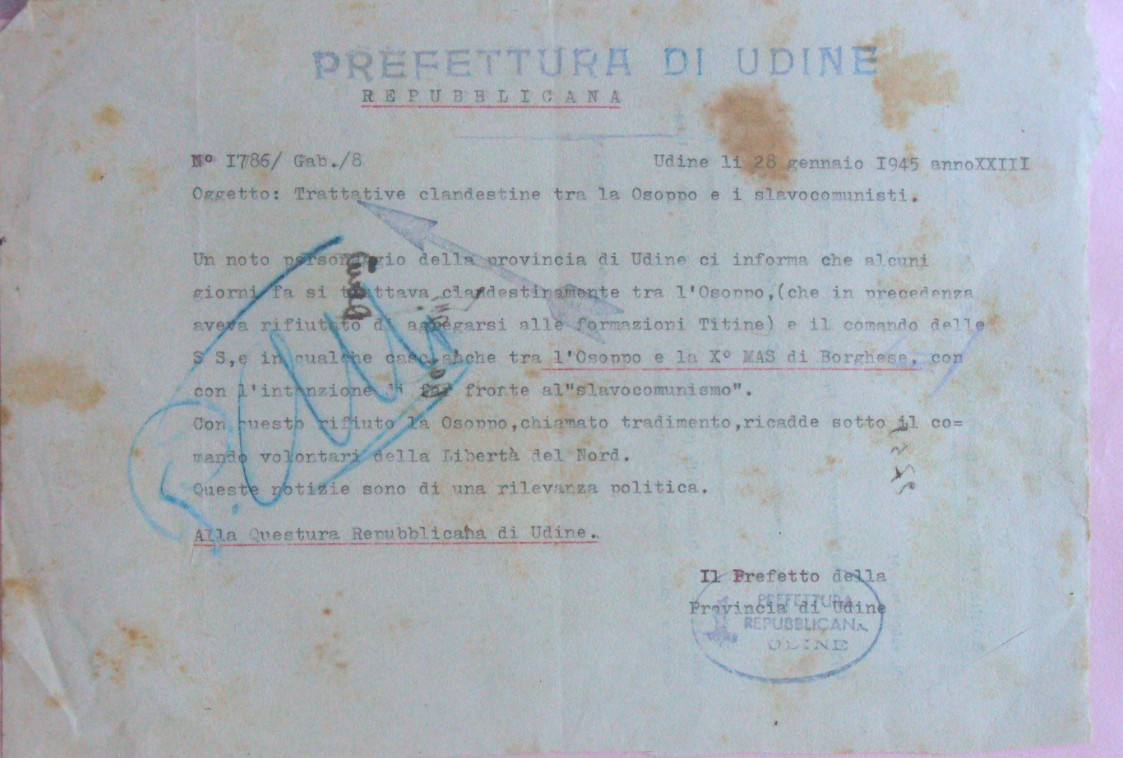
Message of the Udine prefecture about the negotiation between SS and Osoppo.

Over 3,500 communist partisans of Garibaldi-Natisone division accepted but not the autonomous of Ossopo, including Elda Turchetti, a militant killed and reputed by communists as an X MAS spy.

If the Osoppo members were based on principles of defence of national interests, which should have been discussed only after the end of the war, Garibaldi partisans were also very doubtful given the political positions and authoritarian methods adopted by Slovenian in their territories.

[...] It is wrong to mobilize people who are not only not in favour but are against it; it is wrong to impose Slovenian in schools, if this is not required by those concerned; it is harmful to respond with hostile acts and threats to the opposition of the population [...]

— Giovanni Padoan

Despite that, almost 1,500 Garibaldi partisans, even with hardship, were obliged to accept the strategy of PCI leaders on 24 December 1944 and they crossed the Isonzo. Their command moved toward Circhina and Zakriž, in the current Slovenia. At the end of the war, Garibaldi partisans were sent to free Lubiana and not Trieste, as initially promised.

It is a serious decision, a big mistake, because it is clear that Slovenians have changed their position on the border issue and we should not accept the request of the 9th Corps.

— Mario Lizzero to Aldo Lampredi, national leader of PCI.

=== Allied missions and conflict between Osoppo and Garibaldi Brigades ===
Since July 1944, the American Office of Strategic Services (OSS) had begun a linking mission in Friuli with the partisan called Chicago-Texas. This mission was led by two Italian agents affiliated to PCI, Alfredo Michelagnoli and Giuseppe Gozzer.

The mission was organized accordingly to a wider agreement between OSS and PCI, providing the enrolment of "experienced men" appointed by the party, in exchange for the use of the radio of the secret service by the party in order to communicate with their leaders in the territories occupied by nazi-fascists.

However, Gozzer, although he headed a mission of the Allies, began soon the chief of staff of the Brigata Garibaldi-Friuli, generating uncertainties among the members of Special Operations Executive (SOE, one of the British secret services for the operation behind the enemy lines) already active in the zone, who did not know when consider the initiatives of Gozzer as adopted in his qualify as representative of Americans or in that of communist partisan commander.

On the other hand, there was not any specific coordination between the missions of OSS and SOE and this situation generated "the most complete confusion", putting in involuntary competition the missions started independently on the same territory, and provoking inefficiency and undue dangers for the Allies agents themselves. Moreover, the different approach of the Allied missions did not provide to partisans a coherent figure of the Anglo-American alliance and made their military action less efficient.

The scarcity of material sent by air by the Allies (always subordinated to the needs of war on other fronts and starting from a limited availability) and the notable gap between the promises of missions and the material actually sent (beside the different promises of OSS and SOE agents), induced the local Resistance to a cynical attitude following the development of a lack of trust in the Allies, thus encouraging revolutionary propaganda and adherence to pro-Soviet tendencies.

In general, as Claudio Pavone explains, if the supplies did not reach the brigades, or few came, partisans often tended to believe that this was due to the fact that "the British and American armies were still instruments of two capitalist and imperialist powers and imperialist".

Agent Nicholson of the British service, who also supported the Garibaldi groups in negotiations with the Osoppo Brigades, assessed the work of Gozzer with extreme harshness, stigmatizing how, in his opinion, the OSS was relying on a "mercenary puppet" completely under the control of "the most violent communist" in northern Italy. At the same time, Michelagnoli sent reports to the OSS in which he praised the Garibaldi Brigades for their "fighting spirit" and "sure anti-fascism", while he accused the Osoppo of having numerous ex-fascists and politically compromised personalities among their members, while remarking that there were no noteworthy incidents between the two formations.

A different version was given by reports of another OSS mission - led by the American Major Lloyd Smith - sent to the area and controlled by a section of the service different from the one responsible for the Chicago-Texas. Lloyd Smith, in his reports, indicated Gozzer as an active communist propagandist, consciously committed to sabotaging peace attempts between various partisan groups in which Lloyd Smith himself was engaged. Lloyd Smith unsuccessfully asked his command to be given the necessary authority to impose his point of view - that it was the political one on the Allied side, considering the pacification and coordination between Osoppo and Garibaldi as useful and necessary - arriving at threaten the withdrawal of their mission. In November 1944 similar protests of the British side, relating to the same situation, came to the OSS command of Caserta. However, the head of the criticized mission, Suhling, severely rejected the accusations, turning them over Nicholson and Smith, claiming that they were the ones who gave a political connotation to their action in order to "unify formations of different ideological origins", thus contributing to interpret allied action as a "political pressure" and claiming to "influence if not to lead" the partisan organizations. Suhling concluded by proposing the removal of Smith.

The tiring but largely unsuccessful attempts of pacification and unification of the Osoppo and Garibaldi Brigades conducted by British agents during the summer of 1944 failed definitively when the area was subjected to violent raids by Germans. Nicholson could only acknowledge that, among the Garibaldi, the hostility towards the Allies (due to the lack of supply launches and to the poor progress of the advance in Italy) and to the Osoppo had grown, rather than decreased. At the same time the Garibaldi had increased their political activity. Indeed, the British agents had been threatened with arrests and executions. Following these facts and threats, Nicholson himself moved to Udine, thus abandoning his sector. On the eastern side of the Tagliamento river (which constituted a true natural border with a large gravel bed about one kilometre wide) the situation was even more difficult, as this territory was openly claimed by the Yugoslav partisans. These combined a strongly hostile policy towards the Osoppo with a continuous pressure so that the Garibaldini were placed directly at their dependencies. An allied agent sent to the area, led by Major Thomas MacPherson, wrote a report to his command in which he stated that the Slovenian 9th Corps considered the major and the Osoppo as collaborators of the Germans and that, for this reason, both the British mission and the Osoppo had to be eliminated at any cost, as they were considered elements that opposed their annexation design. The Osoppo Brigades, in particular, were considered as the "natural enemy" by Slovenian partisans, who led violent propaganda against them, disarming them wherever possible, and denying them any right to recruit. At that point, the agent concluded, the Osoppo Brigades were fighting against seven enemies at once: the Germans, the Russians (serving the Germans), the RSI Fascists, the Slovenians, the Garibaldi partisans, the civil spies and the winter.

In November 1944, the Garibaldi Natisone division passed under the direct dependence of Slovenians, closing each contact with the Osoppo. MacPherson, solicited also by the Allied command of Caserta tried to do a last but vain mediation. On 15 December 1944 MacPherson met the leaders of Natisone and complained how, since their passage to the 9th Corps, frequent incidents occurred between the Garibaldi and Osoppo Brigades, adding that the political divergences had to be absolutely postponed to the end of the war and that they could not be a hindrance to military operation in any case, underlying how the Allies were bound by international agreements which did not allow them to interfere in the internal politics of the freed countries. However, the appeal was vain. In his report written after the end of the war, MacPherson thought that the Garibaldi partisans had accepted the advice of a unified command with the Osoppo Brigades only in order to obtain in exchange an increase of launches of supplies by the Allies, then bagging most of them.that they preserved during the German fall attack, while the Osoppo partisans, heavily defeated, lost most of their equipment.

The passage of the Natisone under Slovenian command marked the occupation of the whole area by the 9th Corpss which, according to MacPherson, declared the Italian language illegal there, imposing the use of Slovene in every sphere, and organized some annexation "plebiscites" with voting papers opened under the threat of weapons. Men of the 9th corpus also launched a violent propaganda campaign against the Osoppo Brigades, arresting and deporting some of the relays, and accusing their partisans of capitalism, fascism and collaboration with the Germans. However it was the Slovenes, in a certain sense, who collaborated with the Germans, reporting to them the Osoppo bases and movements. At the same time, both the Osoppo and the British mission were accused of being German spies. Despite these complaints, the position of the SOE was not changed in an anti-communist sense and, indeed, it was concerned to keep clear that the positions expressed by its agents were to be attributed exclusively to themselves, and not to the service. Therefore, at the beginning of February 1945, SOE informed its agents that it was not possible to intervene in any way on the Slovenes, and that the agents were required to stay out of any clash between Slovenes and non-communist partisans.

=== Porzûs massacre ===
The Osoppo Brigades were involved in a massacre occurred on 7 February 1945 near the malghe of Porzûs (comune of Faedis, Eastern Friuli). The event, connected to the specific situation on the eastern border with the strong ideological motivations of communist Garibaldi partisans and the nationalist rancours between Slavs and Italians, was the most severe bloodshed between partisan formations during the Resistance.

In Porzûs there was the command of the Gruppo delle Brigate Est della Divisione Osoppo ("Group of the Eastern Brigades of the Osoppo Divisio") led by Alpini commander Francesco De Gregori, known as "Bolla". His autonomous formation operated in region dominated by Garibaldi formations of Slovenian 9th Corps. The Osoppo partisans, with their continuous protests against the Yugoslav nationalist aims and the collaborationist policy of the Garibaldi, reported also by Bolla at the Udine NLC, provoked the reaction of the communist members of the Committee who ordered the GAP members of the zone to attack the Osoppo headquarter.

About a hundred gappisti were then sent to the place under the command of Mario Toffanin "Giacca", a highly ideological and extremist partisan who captured "Bolla" and other Osoppo commanders, including the GL member Gastone Valente "Enea". Toffanin immediately shot them and subtracted correspondences, weapons and supplies. Later, all the other Osoppo partisan, including Guido Pasolini (elder brother of Pier Paolo), were killed except two who accepted to join the GAP.

The massacre had judiciary consequences with a long trial which ended with severe penalties.

=== March and April 1945 ===
In March, the Osoppo brigades operated with five divisions and included:

- 1ª Brigata Osoppo Prealpi with a Prealps battalion
- 2ª brigata Osoppo with "Val But" and "Tolmezzo" battalions
- 3ª brigata Osoppo with battaglione Giustizia
- 5ª brigata Osoppo with battaglione Piave;
- 1ª divisione Osoppo Carnia with battaglione Carnia
- 2ª divisione Osoppo territoriale with "Pontebba" and "Ledra" battalions
- 2ª divisione Gruppo sud with brigata Osoppo Martelli and 2º battaglione Partidor
- Brigata Autonoma Rosselli
- Battaglione Divisionale Guastatori
- Battaglione Divisionale Monte Canin

== Notable members ==
- Primo Cresta
- Cecilia Deganutti
- Renato Del Din
- Paola Del Din
- Francesco De Gregori
- Galliano Fogar
- Don Aldo Moretti
- Guido Pasolini
- Tarcisio Petracco
- Zefferino Tomè

=== Awarded ===
The followings are the partisans awarded with the Italian Gold Medal of Military Valour.

- Giovanni Battista Berghinz
- Cecilia Deganutti
- Renato Del Din
- Paola Del Din
- Francesco De Gregori
- Don Aldo Moretti
- Pierino Celetto
- Pietro Maset
- Giuseppe De Monte
- Aldo Zamorani
- Luigi Antonio Tami
- Giuseppe Gozzer
- Terzo Drusin
- Franco Martelli

== See also ==
- Porzûs (film)
- Christian Democracy
- Brigate Fiamme Verdi

== Bibliography ==
- Battaglia, Roberto (1964). Storia della Resistenza italiana. Turin: Einaudi.
- Bocca, Giorgio. Storia dell'Italia partigiana.
- Sala, Teodoro. Il fascismo italiano e gli Slavi del sud.
- Oliva, Gianni (1999). La resa dei conti (special edition for il Giornale ed.). Milan: Mondadori.
- Petacco, Arrigo (1999). L'esodo: la tragedia negata degli italiani d'Istria, Dalmazia e Venezia Giulia. Milano: Mondadori. ISBN 8804458976. OCLC 702586945.
- Piffer, Tommaso (2010). Gli alleati e la Resistenza italiana. Bologna: Il mulino. ISBN 9788815133359. OCLC 631128245.
- Bianchi, Gianfranco; Silvani, Silvano, eds. (2012) [1983]. Per rompere un silenzio più triste della morte. Il processo di Porzûs. Testo della sentenza 30.04.1954 della Corte d'Assise d'Appello di Firenze. Udine: La Nuova Base Editrice. ISBN 978-88-6329-059-2.
- Petracco, Tarcisio (1994). La lotta partigiana al confine orientale (la bicicletta della libertà). Udine: Ribis.
- Cresta, Primo (1969). Un partigiano dell'Osoppo al confine orientale. Del Bianco Editore.
- Savorgnan di Brazzà, Alvise (1998). Fazzoletto verde. La Nuova Base.
- Smith, Patrick Martin (1991). Friuli '44. Un ufficiale britannico tra i partigiani. Del Bianco.
