= Republic of Carnia =

Former state in Italy

Republic of Carnia Repubblica di Carnia
- 1944
- Flag
- Status: Unrecognized state
- Capital: Ampezzo
- Common languages: Italian
- Government: Italian partisan republic
- Historical era: World War II
  - Established: September 26 1944
  - Disestablished: October 10 1944

Area
- 2,580 km^{2} (1,000 sq mi)

Population
- 90,000

The Republic of Carnia was a short-lived partisan republic with the capital of Ampezzo.The republic had an area of around 2,580 square kilometers (1,000 sq mi) and a population of around 90,000. Despite Italy not having the right for women to vote in elections, the Republic of Carnia allowed women to vote. A year later in 1945, Italy allowed women to vote. The country was under a direct democracy and every municipality had a say.

The Republic of Carnia consisted of around 40 municipalities with another 8 being only partially controlled. In October 1944, much like the other partisan states, German troops and Cossack collaborators who had joined the German forces in the Soviet Union took over the area. The Cossacks established the puppet Kosakenland on the territory. Many of the partisans fled to nearby Yugoslavia.

== See also ==
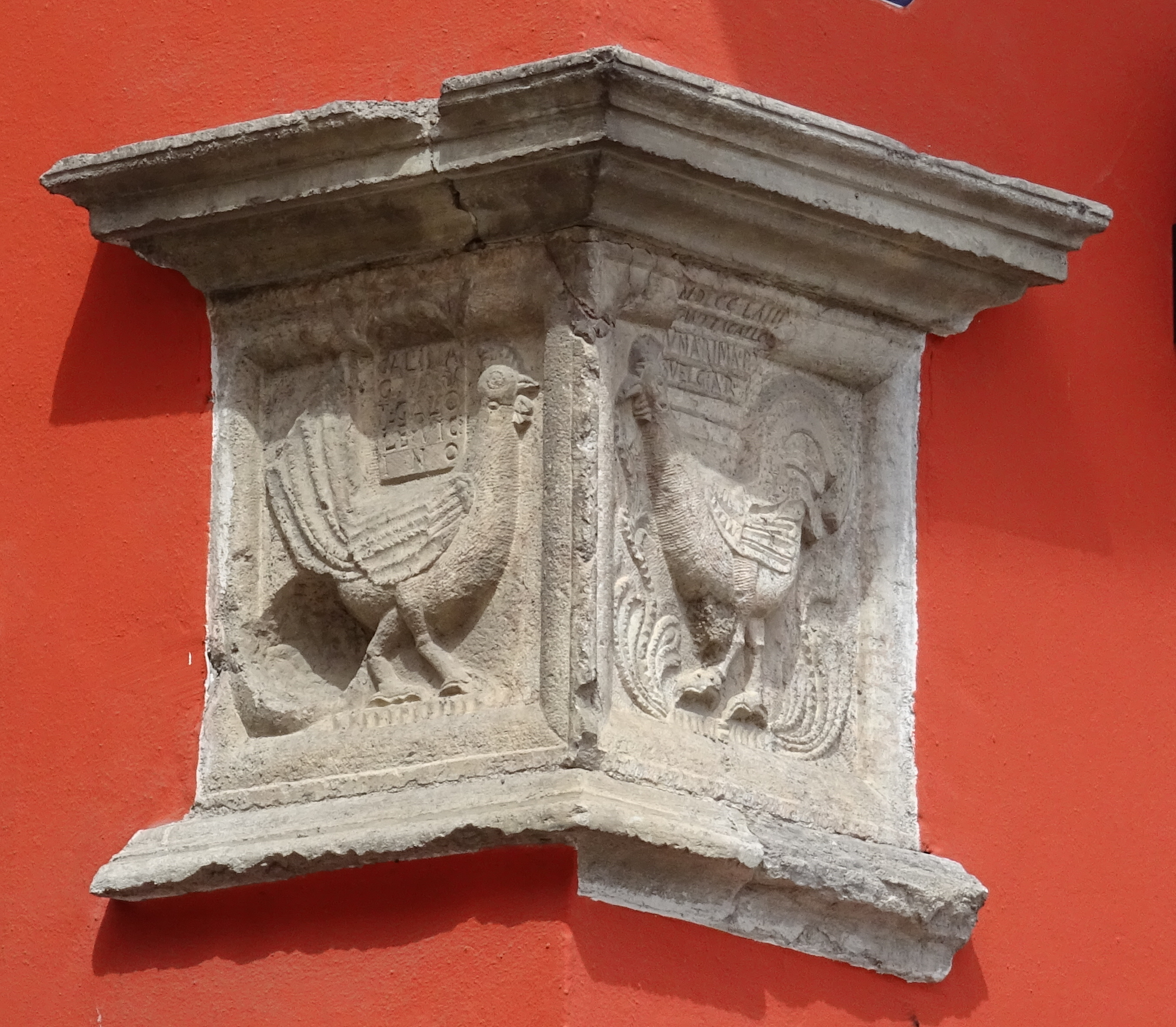
- People's Palace Cornerstone
  Italian Partisan Republics
- Italian resistance movement
