= Soviet repressions against former prisoners of war =

WW2 persecution of returning Soviet POWs

During and after World War II, the Soviet Union implemented strict policies toward its prisoners of war (POWs), treating their capture or encirclement by enemy forces as an act of treason. Issued in August 1941, Order No. 270 classified commanders and political officers who surrendered as deserters, subjecting them to execution and punitive measures against their families. As the war progressed, Soviet authorities reassessed their stance, distinguishing between voluntary collaborators and those captured involuntarily. By late 1944, Soviet repatriation policies dictated that freed POWs would either be returned to military service, drafted into construction battalions or handed over to the NKVD. At the Yalta Conference, the Western Allies agreed to repatriate Soviet citizens, regardless of their wishes.

During and after the war, former POWs underwent screening in reserve military units or NKVD filtration camps. Declassified Soviet records indicate that the majority were reintegrated into society, while a significant minority—particularly those accused of collaboration—were sentenced to forced labor camps or penal military units. On 7 July 1945, a Supreme Soviet decree formally pardoned all former prisoners of war who had not collaborated. In 1955, an amnesty released most remaining collaborators. Former POWs were denied veteran status and benefits for decades. In 1995, Russia formally recognized former Soviet POWs as veterans, granting them equal rights with other war participants.

== During the war ==
From the beginning of the Second World War, the Soviet policy—intended to discourage defection—advertised that any soldier who had fallen into enemy hands, or simply encircled without capture, was guilty of high treason and subject to execution, confiscation of property, and reprisal against their families. Initially, the recaptured POWs were judged based on the criminal code (article 193 of the Criminal Code of the USSR and the analogous article 58 of the Criminal Code of the RSFSR). Those who surrendered themselves were charged with ‘unwarranted leaving of a unit or a place of service’ (193–7), ‘escape from a unit’ (193–8), ‘unwarranted leaving of a unit in a tactical situation’ (193–9), or ‘surrendering oneself when it was unjustified by the tactical situation’ (193–22). Even those had broken out of encirclement were tried under clause 193–21, ‘unwarranted disobedience of battle orders by a leader for the purpose of favouring the enemy’.

Issued shortly after the invasion (in August 1941), Order No. 270 classified all commanders and political officers who surrendered as culpable deserters to be summarily executed and their families arrested. Sometimes Red Army soldiers were told that the families of defectors would be shot; although thousands were arrested, it is unknown if any such executions were carried out. There have been estimates that 10,221 Soviet soldiers were executed in the first months of the war alone. As the war continued, Soviet leaders realized that most Soviet citizens had not voluntarily collaborated. In November 1944, the State Defense Committee decided that freed prisoners of war would be returned to the army while those who served in German military units or police would be handed over to the NKVD. At the Yalta Conference, the Western Allies agreed to repatriate Soviet citizens regardless of their wishes.

By late December 1941 the Soviet regime set up many NKVD filtration camps, hospitals, and recuperation centers for freed prisoners of war, where most stayed for an average of one or two months. These filtration camps were intended to separate out the minority of voluntary collaborators, but were not very effective. The majority of defectors and collaborators escaped prosecution.

By 1944, more than 90% of the POWs in the camps were cleared, and about 8% were arrested or condemned to serve in penal battalions. In 1944, they were sent directly to reserve military formations to be cleared by the NKVD. Further, in 1945, about 100 filtration camps were set for repatriated Ostarbeiter, POWs, and other displaced persons, which processed more than 4,000,000 people.

== After the war ==
By 1946, 80% civilians and 20% of POWs were freed, 5% of civilians, and 43% of POWs were re-drafted, 10% of civilians and 22% of POWs were sent to construction battalions, and 2% of civilians and 15% of the POWs (226,127 out of 1,539,475 total) were transferred to the NKVD, i.e. the Gulag. Another estimate for the percentage of soldiers sent to Gulags is 17%.

=== Punishments and amnesties ===
Trawniki men were typically sentenced to between 10 and 25 years in a Gulag labor camp and military collaborators often received six-year sentences to special settlements. The book Dimensions of a Crime. Soviet Prisoners of War in World War II reports that of 1.5 million returnees by March 1946, 43 percent continued their military service, 22 percent were drafted into labor battalions for two years, 18 percent were sent home, 15 percent were sent to NKVD filtration camps, and 2 percent worked for repatriation commissions. Death sentences were rare. On 7 July 1945, a Supreme Soviet decree formally pardoned all former prisoners of war who had not collaborated. Another amnesty in 1955 released all remaining collaborators except those sentenced for torture or murder.

According to Russian historian G.F. Krivosheev, 233,400 former Soviet POWs were found guilty of collaborating with the enemy and sent to Gulag camps out of 1,836,562 Soviet soldiers who returned from captivity. According to other historians, 19.1% of ex-POWs were sent to penal battalions of the Red Army, 14.5% were sent to forced labour "reconstruction battalions" (usually for two years), and 360,000 people (about 8%) were sentenced to ten to twenty years in the Gulag. The survivors were released during the general amnesty for all POWs and accused collaborators in 1955 on the wave of De-Stalinization following Stalin's death in 1953 but most were subject to enduring discrimination.

== Discrimination ==
Former prisoners of war were not recognized as veterans and denied veterans' benefits; they often faced discrimination due to perception that they were traitors or deserters. Most were forced to settle in remote regions, subject to regular controls, and denied compensation payments (even after the fall of the Soviet Union), common in most other countries. Most of the discriminatory provisions were legally abolished only in the 1990s; however, due to lackluster interest in this topic by the Russian government, the surviving Soviet POWs were still denied compensation afforded to other Allied POWs for being used as forced labor. In 1995, Russia equalized the status of former prisoners of war with that of other veterans. Soviet POWs did not receive any reparations until 2015, when the German government paid a symbolic amount of €2,500 to the few thousand still alive.

== See also ==
- German mistreatment of Soviet prisoners of war
- Order No. 227
- Repatriation of Soviet citizens after World War II – Population transfer program by Allies of World War II
  - Operation Keelhaul – 1946–1947 forced repatriation of Soviet military collaborators
  - Repatriation of Cossacks after World War II – Repatriation of anti-Soviet Cossack collaborators to the Soviet Union
- Soviet atrocities committed against prisoners of war during World War II

== Sources ==
- Blank, Margot; Quinkert, Babette (2021). Dimensionen eines Verbrechens: Sowjetische Kriegsgefangene im Zweiten Weltkrieg | Dimensions of a Crime. Soviet Prisoners of War in World War II (in German and English). Metropol Verlag. ISBN 978-3-86331-582-5.
- Edele, Mark (2017). Stalin's Defectors: How Red Army Soldiers became Hitler's Collaborators, 1941-1945. Oxford University Press. ISBN 978-0-19-251914-6.
- Latyschew, Artem (2021). "History of oblivion, recognition and study of former prisoners of war in the USSR and Russia". Dimensionen eines Verbrechens: Sowjetische Kriegsgefangene im Zweiten Weltkrieg | Dimensions of a Crime. Soviet Prisoners of War in World War II (in German and English). Metropol Verlag. pp. 240–257. ISBN 978-3-86331-582-5.
- Moore, Bob (2022). Prisoners of War: Europe: 1939-1956. Oxford University Press. ISBN 978-0-19-257680-4.
