= Victims of Yalta =

1977 book by Nikolai Tolstoy

- First UK edition
- Author: Nikolai Tolstoy
- Language: English
- Publisher: Hodder & Stoughton (UK)
- Publication date: 1977

Victims of Yalta (British title) or The Secret Betrayal (American title) is a 1977 book by Nikolai Tolstoy that chronicles the repatriation of Soviet citizens after World War II by the Western Allies. The book alleges that British political and military leaders executed a profound humanitarian betrayal by forcibly returning over two million Soviet citizens and anti-communist refugees to face immediate execution or the Gulag system.

Benefiting from the declassification of British Foreign Office and War Office records under the "30-year rule", Tolstoy utilized thousands of pages of official correspondence, cabinet minutes, and military orders to map the mechanics of operations like the forced handovers of Cossacks at Lienz and Judenburg. While early accounts praised the book for its unprecedented archival depth and exposure of institutional complicity, later historical analysis deemed his broader narrative excessively polemical, bordering on conspiratorial. Neither Tolstoy's sweeping statistical claims of Soviet persecution were born out by subsequent research.

== Background ==
Post-war repatriation policies were established at the 1945 Yalta Conference, where Western Allies and the Soviet Union agreed to repatriate liberated citizens, though ambiguities regarding consent allowed the Soviet side to claim authority over individuals regardless of their wishes. Although not explicitly mandating forced repatriation, the agreements led to the mandatory handover of all Soviet nationals, a process distorted by Western fears for their own prisoners-of-wars and a failure to differentiate between legitimate Soviet citizens and White Russian émigrés in some cases.

== Narative structure ==
In Victims of Yalta, Tolstoy describes several historical events and the fate of various groups who found themselves in the areas controlled by the Western Allies and were repatriated to the Soviet Union, irrespective of their wishes. The topics include forced handover of Cossack collaborators; the collaborationist Russian Liberation Army; Ostlegionen of the German Wehrmacht; POWs; Hiwis (German Army auxiliaries); and slave laborers (Ostarbeiter). Tolstoy structures the Victims of Yalta as a document-driven institutional and diplomatic history. Rather than organizing the text around anecdotal memories or loose survivor accounts, Tolstoy builds a rigid chronological framework using official British government files—including Foreign Office, War Office, and Cabinet records—released under the 30-year rule. The text progresses sequentially, tracing the geopolitical origins of the repatriation policy at the late 1944 Moscow and Yalta conferences, moving through the localized execution of the operations in 1945, and culminating in the final, late-stage deportations of 1947 code-named Operation Keelhaul.

The structural integration of the historical subjects relies on a top-down synthesis of both civilian and military factions. Instead of dividing the material by demographic groups, Tolstoy weaves the separate fates of the Kazachi Stan (Cossack encampment) civilians and irregulars, and the troops of the XV SS Cossack Cavalry Corps to construct a cumulative legal argument. The narrative structure is organized to support a thesis of high-level political conspiracy rather than a localized military error. Tolstoy arranges his chapters, particularly those detailing the Cossack handovers, to allege that British political elites, such as Anthony Eden and Harold Macmillan, intentionally deceived the British Cabinet and manipulated military protocols to enforce the handovers.

== Historical accuracy ==
Modern historians differentiate between the book's groundbreaking archival documentation and its subsequent interpretive conclusions. On one hand, Tolstoy's work is praised for its empirical accuracy in mapping the bureaucratic mechanics of the post-war repatriations. By analyzing unredacted British Foreign Office and War Office records released under the "30-year rule", Tolstoy provided a day-by-day reconstruction of how the forced handovers were planned and executed. His documentation regarding the wrongful inclusion of approximately 3,000 non-Soviet "White émigrés" during the roundups at Lienz and Spittal was later verified as correct by independent investigators and migration scholars.

On the other hand, contemporary scholarship has identified severe analytical and empirical inaccuracies regarding Tolstoy's grand narrative and statistical claims. Following the opening of the classified Soviet NKVD and SMERSH filtration archives in the 1990s, research disproved Tolstoy's baseline assumption that the overwhelming majority of the two million repatriated individuals were immediately executed or sent to perish in the Gulag system. Archival data revealed that roughly 60 percent of returning citizens were cleared by Soviet authorities and sent straight back to their pre-war homes, meaning Tolstoy had drastically overestimated the scale of immediate Soviet lethal retribution. (Roughly 15 percent of former POWs were sent to the Gulag or arrested, while 2 percent of former Ostarbeiter faced the same fate.) Furthermore, historians have criticized Tolstoy for compromising his historical accuracy by failing to engage with Russian-language sources and by viewing highly volatile, pressured wartime logistics strictly through a lens of high-level political villainy.

== Reception ==
Upon its initial publication in 1977, The Victims of Yalta received widespread public and critical acclaim, breaking decades of government silence and sparking intense political controversy in Great Britain. Early reviews praised the book as a monumental work of revisionist institutional history that successfully forced the Western academic community to confront the dark ethical realities of post-war Allied foreign policy. Commentators lauded Tolstoy's ability to weave cold, bureaucratic administrative records into a gripping, deeply moving historical narrative, which quickly established the book as a foundational text on the geopolitical consequences of the Yalta Conference.

However, as the initial shock faded, the book's long-term academic reception became increasingly critical. In subsequent decades, academic historians reviewing Tolstoy's work highlighted several technical and analytical limitations within his text. Critics specifically challenged his introduction of conspiratorial interpretations, which laid explicit blame on high-ranking British figures like Harold Macmillan and Anthony Eden for allegedly hiding the repatriation operations from the cabinet. The influential work heavily fueled Cossack historical negationism by focusing almost exclusively on the tragic human suffering and legal deception of the Allied repatriations at the civilian-heavy Lienz camp. By framing the Cossacks primarily as victims of "Western betrayal" and Soviet totalitarianism, the publication inadvertently allowed diaspora apologists to overshadow and minimize the extensive record of Axis war crimes committed by these forces across occupied Europe.

While scholars like Christopher Booker and Pavel Polian acknowledge The Victims of Yalta as a monumental institutional history, they point out his tendency to view multi-layered, high-pressure diplomatic crises strictly through a lens of moral villainy. Furthermore, post-1990s research utilizing unlocked Soviet state archives revealed that Tolstoy significantly overestimated the proportion of returnees who were executed or permanently interned in the Gulag. Despite these interpretive flaws and the subsequent legal controversies that shadowed his later writings, Tolstoy's book remains recognized as a foundational, highly influential text that successfully dismantled decades of government silence and forced a rigorous, document-driven exploration of Allied post-war policy.

Alistair Horne, Harold Macmillan's biographer, describes Victims of Yalta as "an honorable, and profoundly disturbing book which pulled no punches", but he was highly critical of Tolstoy's follow-up books, arguing that their increasing stridency and tendency to twist the evidence to fit a preconceived theory effectively vitiated them as serious works of history. Horne also notes that Macmillan, then 90, felt he was too old to initiate a suit to defend himself. Horne's final judgement is that fresh evidence, uncovered after the publication of Victims of Yalta, proves Tolstoy's notion of a conspiracy was not just wrong-headed, but outright wrong.

== Later books ==
Tolstoy followed his Victims of Yalta investigations with Stalin's Secret War (1981) and The Minister and the Massacres (1986). In these books, he deals more with the issue that in May 1945 British forces in Carinthia handed over emigres from Russia who were not Soviet citizens and, in the latter, chronicles also the British release of the anti-communist Slovenes and Croats to Josip Broz Tito's Yugoslav government. The last of the three books was particularly controversial, and it led to a 1989 libel suit in which Lord Aldington prevailed against Tolstoy's charge that he was a "war criminal".

== See also ==
- The Great Betrayal – book by Vyacheslav Naumenko dealing with the repatriation of the Cossacks after World War II
- Operation Keelhaul – book by Julius Epstein covering the program of post-war repatriations to the Soviet Union
