= Cowgill =

Cowgill may refer to:

== Placenames ==
- Cowgill, Cumbria, England
- Cowgill, Missouri, United States
- Cowgill, South Lanarkshire, Scotland
- Cowgill Hall

== Surname ==
- Anthony Cowgill (1915–2009), British army officer and researcher
- Bryan Cowgill (1927–2008), British television executive
- Calvin Cowgill (1819–1903), politician
- Collin Cowgill (born 1986), American baseball player
- Darian Cowgill (born 1972), American mix engineer, mastering engineer, and record producer
- George Cowgill (1929–2018), American anthropologist and archaeologist
- Jack Cowgill (born 1997), English footballer
- James Cowgill (1848–1922), politician
- Joseph Cowgill (1860–1936), English prelate of the Roman Catholic Church
- Joseph W. Cowgill (1908–1986), politician
- Makenna Cowgill (born 1998), American child actress
- Peter Cowgill (born 1953), British businessman
- Ursula Cowgill (1927–2015), American biologist
- Warren Cowgill (1929–1985), American linguist
