= Repatriation of Soviet citizens after World War II =

Population transfer program by Allies of World War II

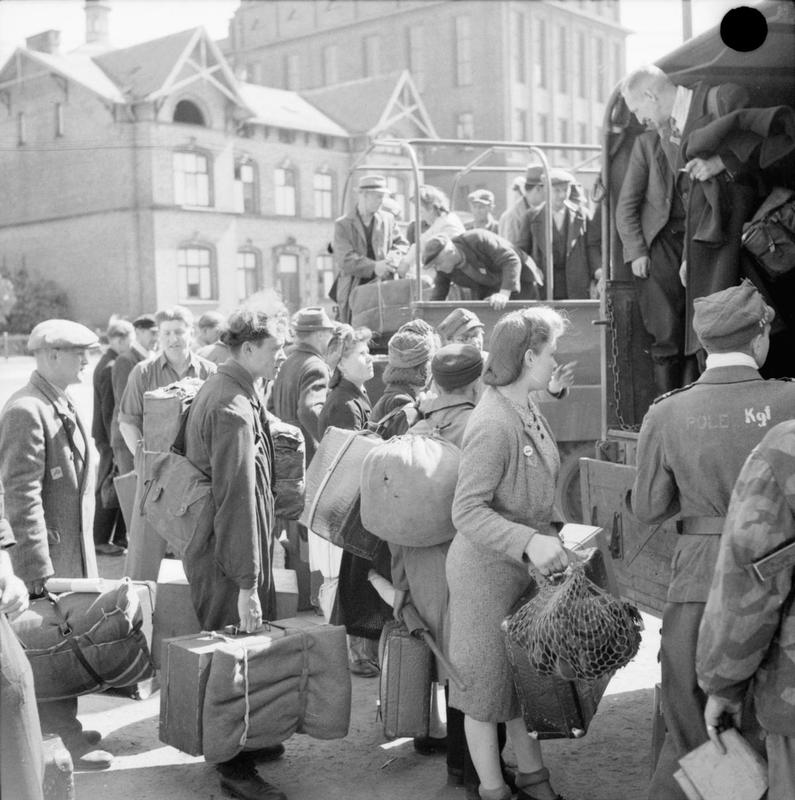
- Displaced persons in Hamburg being placed onto trucks by the British Army, 1945
- Type: Inter-governmental population transfer program
- Location: Allied-occupied Europe and the Soviet Union
- Planned by: Yalta Conference signatories
- Commanded by: (Soviet Union) Filipp Golikov (United States) Stanley R. Mickelsen (United Kingdom) Sholto Douglas
- Target: Displaced persons (ostarbeiters, POWs, collaborationists, and refugees)
- Date: February 1945 – 1951 (Bulk of handovers: May – October 1945)
- Outcome: 4.2 million individuals repatriated

Repatriation of Soviet citizens after World War II was an inter-governmental population transfer program undertaken by Soviet, British, American, and other Allied forces to resettle citizens of the USSR who were located in territories under Allied control. Amounting to 4.2 million people, these included Ostarbeiters, collaborationists, prisoners of war, and refugees. The Allies of World War II agreed to mandatory repatriation at the Yalta Conference in February 1945. The bulk of handovers occurred from May to October 1945. Official repatriation activities lasted until 1951.

About 80 percent of displaced persons from pre-1939 Soviet borders returned voluntarily. Western Allies initially used force to transfer those who resisted repatriation, primarily collaborators, but later shifted toward a voluntary policy. Notable instances of forced repatriation were the British handover of Cossack collaborators in May and June of 1945 and the Operation Keelhaul of 1946 and 1947, a targeted Allied dragnet aimed at flushing out remaining military collaborators.

Declassified archives disprove Cold War-era claims of universal, immediate persecution for the returnees. The state cleared and sent home 58 percent of the population. Another 33.5 percent faced mobilization into the military or construction battalions, effectively forced labor. Only 6.5 percent entered NKVD special camps as security risks. The state sent rank-and-file military collaborators to special settlements for six years and prosecuted officers and civilian collaborators in positions of authority.

Civilian returnees endured extortion and sexual violence at filtration points. Local authorities, suspicious neighbors, and employers dominated their post-return lives. Officials assigned civilians to heavy labor and blocked access to advancement, which especially affected urban population. Former POWs faced systemic suspicion and were not accorded the status of veterans unless they had fought in the army after liberation. To avoid permanent stigma, returnees hid their pasts; women married and changed their names. Few of the returnees spoke openly about their experiences.

== Background and planning ==
=== Diplomatic agreements ===
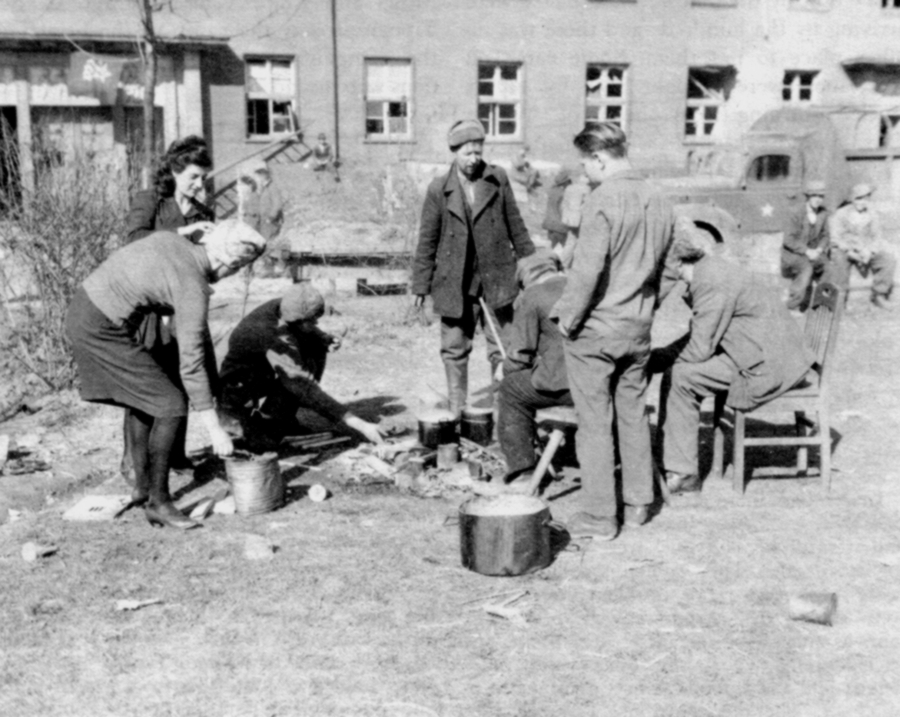
Soviet refugees cooking food over a campfire in the suburbs of Trier

Stalin, Roosevelt, and Churchill agreed to the mandatory repatriation of Soviet citizens during the Yalta Conference in February 1945. On February 11, 1945, the leaders signed bilateral Soviet-American and Soviet-British agreements to return their respective citizens. France signed a matching agreement on June 26, 1945.

As the end of World War II in Europe neared, the Soviet Union held or was expected to liberate tens of thousands of Western prisoners of war. Another factor in the Western Allies acquiescing to Soviet demands to return all Soviet citizens was the expected Soviet declaration of war on Japan to be followed by the invasion of Manchuria.

Those who were subject to repatriation under the Yalta agreements were defined as citizens of the Soviet Union in its pre-1 September 1939 borders. Thus, citizens of the Baltic States, Western Belarus and Western Ukraine were exempt from repatriation. Soviet Union's subsequent attempts to compel their repatriation at the Potsdam Conference fell on deaf ears.

At the same time, a certain number of former subjects of the Russian Empire were handed over: individuals who either never held Soviet citizenship or were born abroad. In May and June 1945, British troops forcibly repatriated collaborationist Cossack officers who were not Soviet citizens.

=== Allied motivations ===
This influx of displaced persons (DPs) strained the Anglo-American occupation administration. Authorities struggled to house and feed the population, distribute care packages, and provide medical care. The local German population also resented the unwanted neighbors. Post-war devastation left the Allies unable to support these crowds. Economic necessity drove the policy, separate from diplomatic relations with the USSR.

The Western Allies sought to shed the logistics of managing DPs. In this regard, their interests coincided with those of the Soviet Union. The repatriations greatly accelerated after the Anglo-American-Soviet agreement signed on 23 May 1945 in Halle outlining the logistics of the handovers and were greatly encouraged. For example, on 1 August the Allied command issued a proclamation instructing any Soviet Ostarbeiter and former POWs to register with the authorities under penalty of arrest; the proclamation announced that living outside of DP camps was prohibited.

The Soviet Union was primarily interested in replenishing its labor pool severely depleted by the human losses during the war. A likely motivation was the concern that citizens left abroad could be used as an anti-communist force in any future confrontation.

== Repatriation process ==
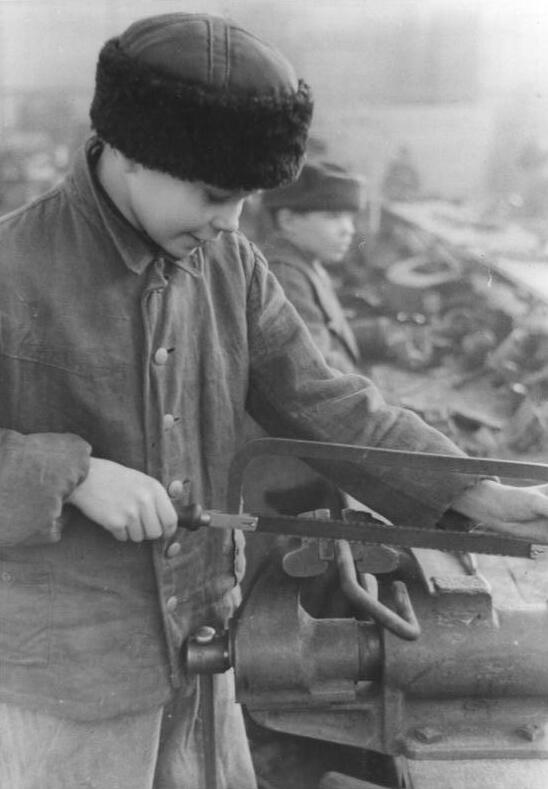
Original Nazi propaganda caption: "A 14-year-old youth from Ukraine repairs damaged motor vehicles in a Berlin workshop of the German Wehrmacht. January 1945."

=== Displaced people ===
The Soviet repatriation administration determined that roughly 5 million Soviet citizens survived in the Reich and occupied Europe at the end of the war. (However, about 1,150,000 of these were internally displaced people, and were not technically repatriates). This population of displaced persons fell into three main categories:

- Forcibly deported civilian laborers: The largest group consisted of workers deported to Germany and other countries for forced labor;
- Soviet prisoners of war: Approximately 1.7 million soldiers survived, including those who entered German military or police service;
- Collaborators and refugees: Tens of thousands of German accomplices and refugees retreated from the USSR, often traveling with their families.

Allied forces controlled the zones holding over 3 million of these displaced Soviet citizens, including Western Germany, France, and Italy. The Red Army controlled the remaining zones in Eastern Europe, which held fewer than 2 million people.

42 percent of repatriates were women; 32 percent were men; and 21 percent were children. Russians and Ukrainians were the two largest groups among the repatriates, with 1.65 million people each. Among Ukrainians, civilians dominated, while it was opposite for Russians, where the majority were POWs.

=== Administrative bodies ===
On the Soviet side, the repatriation activities were the responsibility of the Directorate for Repatriation under the Council of Ministers of the USSR, headed by General Filipp Golikov. The agency was established in October of 1944 with the initial staff of 200 located in Moscow, plus 320 officers within the occupation troops. It coordinated with the frontline and rear services of the armed forces, transportation ministry, and regional and local governments, and managed the transit infrastructure. Its departments included transportation and logistics; registration; medical services; finance; propaganda; and others. In February 1945, a unit managing the repatriation of Allied nationals was added. The agency liaised with Allied forces and local authorities to ensure smooth execution of the program. SMERSH and NKVD managed verification and filtration of repatriated citizens.

In 1944, General Stanley R. Mickelsen was assigned to Supreme Headquarters Allied Expeditionary Force (SHAEF), where he served as Chief, Displaced Persons Branch for the American occupation zone. On the British side, Marshall Sholto Douglas was responsible for the displaced persons and prisoners of war. The Western zones of occupations had about 1,500 DP camps, called "Assembly Centers", with the capacity to house about 4.5 million DPs.

Within the United Nations, repatriation activities were coordinated by the United Nations Relief and Rehabilitation Administration. It had about 8,000 personnel in Europe, 80 percent of whom were based in the Western occupation zones.

At the height of the activities from July to October 1945, the Soviet repatriation effort required the work of over 50,000 personnel dedicated to the resettlement effort. To deal with the flood of repatriates, these employees were temporarily augmented by another 50,000 workers on the regional and local levels to manage their reception. Considering the contributions of other ministries, the combined effort involved about 140,000 to 150,000 personnel.

=== Voluntary vs forced repatriations ===
Contrary to Cold War-era Western perceptions, most of the displaced people returned to the Soviet Union voluntarily. Immigrant questionnaires, repatriate statements, and NKVD informant reports, show that at least 80% of "Easterners" (Soviet residents within pre-September 1939 borders) would have returned to the USSR voluntarily. In contrast, "Westerners" from the Baltic states, Western Ukraine, Western Belarus, and Northern Bukovina mostly opposed returning. The Red Army forcibly repatriated Westerners found in Soviet-controlled sectors. However, British and American authorities exempted Westerners in their zones from mandatory repatriation, transferring only volunteers.

During the war and immediate post-war months, Western allies forcibly transferred non-returning Easterners, primarily collaborators. By autumn 1945, their policy started shifting toward voluntary repatriation for Easterners. In December 1945, the American military command issued a directive specifying that only the following groups of Soviet citizens were to be forcibly repatriated: (a) those taken prisoner in Axis uniforms; (b) former Red Army troops; (c) individuals credibly accused of crimes in the occupied Soviet Union. Mikhail Meandrov, Andrey Sevastyanov and Vladimir Artsezo, high-ranking officers of the Russian Liberation Army, a Nazi-sponsored collaborationist formation, were handed over to the Soviet side under this directive.

Wartime censorship initially concealed the scale and violence of the forced handovers from Western audiences. By late-1945, however, eyewitness accounts of violent struggles, suicides, and self-harm among non-returnees reached the public. These events occurred at camps like Fort Dix in the United States, Kempten Camp in Germany, and Lienz in Austria, during the forced repatriation of Cossack collaborators. British and American newspapers, religious leaders, and political commentators published sharp critiques of the Yalta repatriation policies. They labeled the forced transfers inhumane.

This public outcry and growing discomfort among Allied military personnel influenced the policy shift. Military commanders, including General Dwight D. Eisenhower, expressed reluctance to use force against unarmed persons. By autumn 1945, political and humanitarian pressures forced the American and British governments to change their approach.

The Allies formalized this voluntary principle at the start of the Cold War, despite isolated forced handovers continuing through 1947, such as 1,000 military collaborators netted in Operation Keelhaul. This was the last forced transfer under the overall repatriation program. In the opinion of Russian historian Viktor Zemskov, had repatriation been entirely voluntary, the final number of non-returnees would have reached approximately 1 million people rather than the recorded 500,000.

A minority returned to the Soviet Union late in the repatriation period; about 30,000 returned voluntarily in the years 1947-1952. These were those who chose repatriation over settling down in Germany or resettlement overseas, with the help of the International Refugee Organization (IRO). At that time, the DP camps were closing down, and people were expected to provide for themselves or emigrate. The reasons cited by late returnees were inability to pass an IRO screening, such as due to having a criminal history; some were unable to find a good job in Germany commensurate with their experience. Likewise, they were put off by poor job prospects in potential host countries, such as being expected to serve as domestic workers. Others were fleeing a bad relationship. The USSR accepted everyone, regardless of age, health, and criminal status, and promised help with jobs and housing.

=== Filtration, medical screening, and transport ===
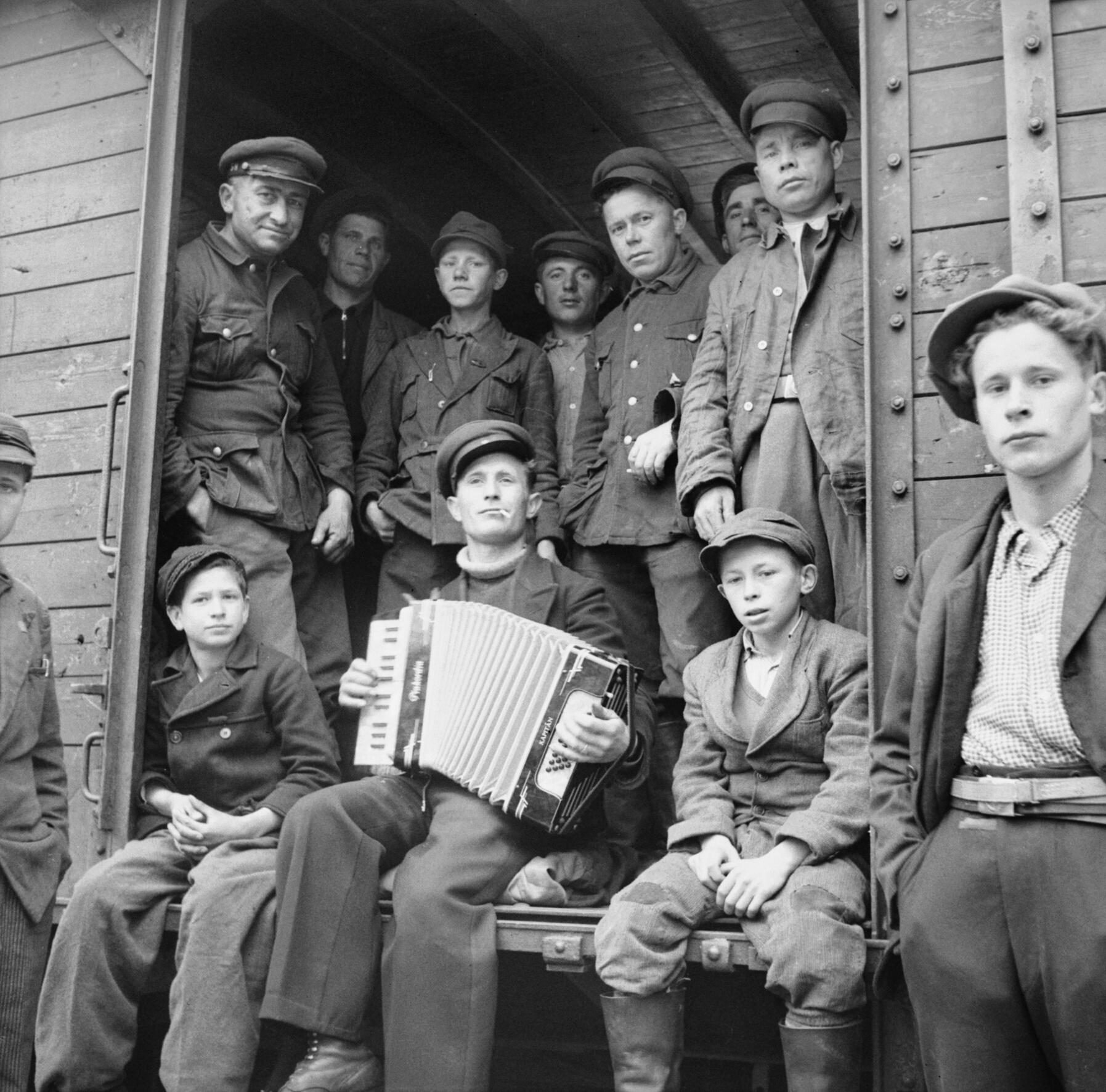
The departure of a train echelon carrying former prisoners of war and Ostarbeiters from a transit camp near Hamburg. May 31, 1945

The majority of repatriates underwent verification and filtration in front-line and army camps, assembly-evacuation points of the People's Commissariat of Defense, and verification-filtration points of the NKVD. Rank-and-file prisoners of war were checked in reserve military units. Those needing further investigation, designated as the "NKVD special contingent" (spetskontingent), were transferred to NKVD special camps. Personnel of collaborationist units were sent to the NKVD special camps or directly to Gulag corrective labor camps to undergo filtration. Officers among the prisoners of war were also sent to the NKVD special camps for further checking.

Official instructions called for the filtration to be completed within 10 to 15 days; 5 days for women with children or the elderly. In practice, the staff were overwhelmed and often people had to spend one or two months in the assembly-evacuation points. The repatriates were also screened medically, in the 142 hospitals and 400 clinics designated for the purpose. The authorities also established 500 bath houses and 700 delousing stations. In the Soviet occupation zones, medical workers identified one million sick individuals of whom 67 percent required outpatient treatment and 33 percent required hospitalization. 3,300 people died during repatriation. Hospitals and clinics were also established in the Western zones of occupation, where doctors identified 900,000 sick individuals, of whom 15 percent required hospitalization.

By July 1945, Golikov's directorate coordinated the work of 190 transit camps and assembly points for a total capacity of 1.5 million people. The network was managed by 37,000 troops. The vast majority of returnees traveled by rail, in goods wagons. Trucks were also used. Maritime transport was used for those returning from overseas, such as the US. Some able-bodied men had to walk hundreds of kilometers, as their possessions were transported by cart. Soviet authorities declined American offers to exchange POWs by air, suspecting that the Americans wanted to reconnoiter their airfields. Aviation in the USSR was not well suited for passenger transport, so only 'high-value' repatriates, such as high-ranking military collaborators, were transported by plane.

During the process of repatriation, the returnees could face abuse by occupation troops and repatriation personnel alike. Guards and commandants used their authority to steal from returnees under the guise of inspections. Newly liberated or returning women were especially vulnerable. Authorities, guards and frontline soldiers assaulted and harassed them during transit and filtration. Officials used threats of collaboration charges to coerce them, with Soviet records containing official reports of rapes but not much in way of investigation and punishment. In the chaotic environment of the immediate post-war months, some returnees were finding work with the occupation troops and risked becoming indentured servants, with few rights, and no way home. At the same time, others used these jobs to avoid repatriation.

=== Avoiding repatriation ===
A minority of Soviet military collaborators and their dependents evaded the forced repatriations, blending into the chaotic landscape of post-war Western Europe. The escapees falsified their identities and obtained temporary identity cards. They hid in displaced persons camps as Polish or Baltic citizens or non-Soviet "old émigrés" who had fled Russia after the Civil War. Following the forced repatriation of Cossacks, the Red Cross took over the administration of the south Austria camps from the military in mid-June 1945. The Red Cross implemented individualized screening that exempted about 2,000 Cossacks from repatriation as non-Soviet citizens. The only unit of the Russian Liberation Army (ROA) that largely avoided repatriation was the ROA air arm commanded by Viktor Maltsev.

Over the next decades, the majority of these former collaborators migrated via the "ratlines" and regular immigration pipelines to Australia and North and South America where they established anti-communist diaspora communities. Among the prominent figures who avoided repatriation was Vyacheslav Naumenko of the Main Administration of Cossack Forces; he surrendered separately to the US forces in Bavaria, avoided the handovers as a non-Soviet citizen, and emigrated to the US. Ivan Kononov (a Soviet citizen), the nominal leader of all Cossack forces under the Committee for the Liberation of the Peoples of Russia, abandoned his command, crossed into the US occupation zone, and later emigrated to Australia under a false identity.

== Outcome ==
Declassified archives disprove Cold War-era claims of universal, immediate persecution for the returnees. The regime arrested 6.5 percent of the 4.2 million returnees during filtration. This included 14 percent of prisoners of war and 2 percent of civilians. Most arrests targeted members of German-commanded formations, resulting in six-year exile terms to distant special settlements. Non-criminal repression included the transfer of 14.5 percent of returnees to construction battalions, effectively forced labor. These former prisoners of war and military-age civilian men worked in coal and heavy industry. They endured forced resettlement and awaited political verification for months before transitioning to ordinary laborers.

=== Prosecution of collaborators ===
By law, military collaborators were expected to face the heaviest punishment. In practice, however, the rank-and-file (privates and sergeants) among the Cossack collaborators and Russian Liberation Army (ROA) usually received six-year terms in special settlements and avoided criminal prosecution. Their families could follow them into exile and were not considered "special settlers".

On the other hand, NKVD arrested and prosecuted commanders and officers of ROA, Ostlegionen (eastern legions), XV SS Cossack Cavalry Corps, Kazachi Stan, Schutzmannschaft (auxiliary police), Gestapo, and similar units; mayors; village heads who collaborated with special zeal; Red Army servicemen who voluntarily defected; and those who participated in punitive operations or were accused of war crimes. They were typically sentenced to the Gulag and received harsh sentences.

=== Fates of the returnees ===
Recent archival research contradicts earlier, overstated claims that the Soviet state immediately executed or imprisoned all post-WWII returnees. While central leaders viewed returnees as both victims and traitors, records of Golikov's Directorate for Repatriation, declassified in 2012, and those from Ukraine's NKVD archive show that central authorities had limited control, with local officials and social dynamics largely determining the experience of return. The most severe trauma civilian returnees faced did not come from supreme Kremlin decrees. Instead, it came from local bosses, suspicious neighbors, and frontline soldiers who exploited the displaced people or treated them as German accomplices.

Returnees encountered economic and social hardships. They found their hometowns devastated. New tenants occupied their former homes, or war destroyed them. Local authorities treated returnees with indifference or suspicion, viewing them as German accomplices. Officials assigned them to heavy labor like peat harvesting and quarrying. Only after completing these tasks could returnees transition to skilled positions. In some cases, the returnees gathered more sympathy and help from local NKVD and repatriation officials in redressing perceived wrongs than from the local authorities.

While central authorities allocated funds for the returnees (an equivalent of one month's salary per person), few claimed them. They might not have been aware or because they returned unofficially, bypassing the state reception centers. For example, in Belarus only 20 percent of these funds were used up. General devastation in the recently liberated territories added to the misery; for example, some of the housing allocated to returnees in Belarus and the Russian Federation included dugouts.

In general, rural residents reported better reintegration experiences, while urban dwellers, and especially urban men, reported the most suspicion and hindrance to their lives due to their past experiences as POWs or repatriates. It wasn't until 1992 that the standard job application questionnaires stopped asking the questions of whether the applicant had ever lived on the occupied territories or had been repatriated.

Former prisoners of war faced bias in education, career advancement, and political integration, such as in joining the Komsomol or the Communist Party. They were denied standard war veteran recognition and associated benefits unless they had re-enlisted in the Red Army and fought on the front lines after their release.

As their formative years were spent abroad, the younger returnees found themselves unable to fit in or were viewed as outsiders. Some were unable to continue their education. Older returnees faced suspicion and hostility from their neighbors. Rumors of returnees acquiring riches in Germany were rampant, so they did not have much sympathy when arriving home. Repatriates were not allowed to return to Moscow, Leningrad, or Kiev, or settle in border regions. Their status meant that they could be denied promotions or would not be considered good marriage prospects. Many hid their past; women married and changed their names. Few spoke openly about their experiences.

=== Statistics ===
The bulk of the repatriations were carried out by March 1946, with the following results:

Results of the checks and the filtration of the repatriants (by March 1, 1946)
Category	Total	%	Civilian	%	POWs	%
Released and sent home (Note: Including those who died in custody.)	2,427,906	58	2,146,126	81	281,780	18
Conscripted	801,152	19	141,962	5	659,190	43
Drafted into construction battalions of the Ministry of Defence	608,095	14.5	263,647	10	344,448	22
Sent to NKVD as spetskontingent (Note: Special contingent)	272,867	6.5	46,740	2	226,127	15
Were waiting for transportation and worked for Soviet military units abroad	89,468	2	61,538	2	27,930	2
Total	4,199,488	100	2,660,013	100	1,539,475	100

== Historiography ==
Cold War-era Western historiography heavily relied on eyewitness accounts from non-returnees and activists. These early texts frequently asserted that the Soviet state executed or imprisoned repatriated individuals en mass upon arrival. In 1973, Austrian-born American journalist Julius Epstein published Operation Keelhaul: The Story of Forced Repatriation adopting this framework. Subsequent popular histories, including Nikolai Tolstoy's 1977 Victims of Yalta, further popularized this approach.

The opening of Soviet archives in the early 1990s shifted the academic consensus. Historian Viktor Zemskov published internal NKVD and Directorate for Repatriation records detailing the precise bureaucratic breakdown of the 4.2 million returnees. While Zemskov’s data proved that the state cleared and sent home the majority (58%) of returnees, scholars like Pavel Polian and Seth Bernstein later argued that these statistics obscure harsher realities. They note that the 14.5% of returnees assigned to military construction battalions faced conditions indistinguishable from forced labor, and that civilian "cleared" status still carried severe local social stigma, surveillance, and economic restrictions.

== See also ==
- Bleiburg repatriations
- Population transfer in the Soviet Union
- Soviet repressions against former prisoners of war
- Swedish extradition of Baltic soldiers
