= Repatriation of Cossacks after World War II =

Repatriation of anti-Soviet Cossack collaborators to the Soviet Union

Repatriation of the Cossacks
- Part of Collaboration with Nazi Germany and the aftermath of World War II
- Operational scope: Repatriation of Soviet citizens after World War II
- Location: Primarily Allied-occupied Austria (Lienz and Judenburg); Other countries
- Planned by: Allies of World War II (Yalta Conference signatories)
- Target: Cossack collaborators with Nazi Germany: XV SS Cossack Cavalry Corps; Kazachi Stan; Cossack auxiliary police and eastern battalions
- Date: May–June 1945 (Austria) through May 1947 (Operation Keelhaul)
- Executed by: (United Kingdom) British V Corps (Austria)
- Outcome: 45,000–50,000 Cossacks repatriated

The repatriation of Cossacks after World War II was the forced transfer of approximately 45,000 to 50,000 Cossack collaborators, including military personnel and civilian dependents, from Allied occupation zones to the Soviet Union between May 1945 and May 1947. The operations focused on members of the Kazachi Stan mobile encampment and the XV SS Cossack Cavalry Corps who had surrendered to British forces in Carinthia, Austria. These formations had aligned with Nazi Germany, operating within the Axis counter-insurgency framework across Belarus, Poland, Yugoslavia, and northern Italy.

The transfers executed bilateral repatriation protocols signed at the February 1945 Yalta Conference to repatriate Soviet nationals at the conclusion of the war. The agreements mandated the reciprocal return of individuals who held Soviet citizenship as of 1 September 1939. Facing a logistical crisis in southern Austria and a border dispute with Yugoslav forces, British commanders prioritized clearing the sector over humanitarian concerns. To prevent mass resistance, British forces used deception to detain Cossack officer cadres at Spittal an der Drau. They then used physical force to clear the encampments at Lienz.

The Austrian operations did not include individual screenings and resulted in violations of the established Yalta parameters. Roughly 3,000 non-Soviet "old émigrés" who had left Russia during the Civil War were deported. Parallel forced returns occurred in the US, UK, and US-occupied Germany, concluding with a screening program in Italy, Operation Keelhaul. Senior commanders, including Ataman Pyotr Krasnov and General Andrei Shkuro, stood trial in Moscow and were executed for treason in January 1947. The rest of the Cossacks received sentences of hard labor in the Gulag or were sent into internal exile.

During the Cold War, the repatriations became a source of historiographical debate. Surviving émigrés, aided by Western supporters, developed a narrative of "Western Betrayal". It omitted Cossack integration into the Nazi security apparatus to focus exclusively on Allied actions. The forced transfers remained a classified post-war secret. Once the British records were released under the thirty-year rule, the topic evolved into a public controversy in Great Britain.

== Background and strategic context ==
During the Russian Civil War (1917–1923), most Cossacks fought against the Red Army in the anti-communist White movement, leading to mass exile or severe state repression for those who remained under Soviet rule. Throughout the 1920s and early 1930s, the Soviet government subjected traditional Cossack lands to aggressive de-Cossackization policies, forced collectivization, and political persecutions, which only partially abated in the mid-1930s.

=== Wartime Cossack collaboration ===
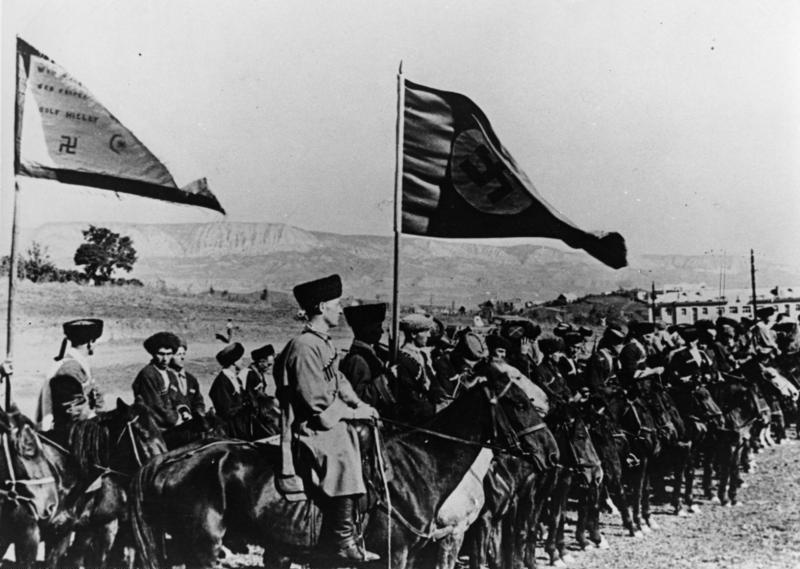
Cossack troops in the Wehrmacht, occupied Soviet Union, 1942

When Nazi Germany launched its invasion of the Soviet Union in 1941, anti-Soviet grievances motivated Cossack leadership, including Pyotr Krasnov and Vyacheslav Naumenko, to lend their voice to the German war effort.. At the same time, front-line necessity led Wehrmacht commanders to bypass racial directives and recruit Cossack defectors and prisoners of war for rear-area security, establishing official security units by October 1941. Local Cossacks in regions like Rostov Oblast, Kuban, and the North Caucasus initially formed self-defense detachments, armed by the Wehrmacht, though enthusiasm waned when German authorities failed to abolish collective farms. German commanders recruited from POW camps, eventually consolidating these auxiliary detachments into the 1st Cossack Cavalry Division under Major General Helmuth von Pannwitz in April 1943.

The coordination and mobilization of collaborationist Cossack forces transitioned from ad-hoc Wehrmacht recruitment into a centralized framework managed by competing Nazi state agencies. Driven by military setbacks, Reich Minister Alfred Rosenberg established the Cossack Central Office in 1942 to oversee ideological propaganda and recruitment, appointing White émigré General Pyotr Krasnov as its head in early 1943. To justify the alliance, Rosenberg and SS racial experts declared the Cossacks a distinct Aryan race descended from the Ostrogoths. In March 1944, the bureaucracy expanded into the Main Administration of Cossack Forces under the Eastern Ministry. This department handled the oversight of recent defectors, prisoners of war, and forced laborers, with Krasnov and Naumenko at the helm. Bureaucratic rivalries between the Eastern Ministry and the SS ended in late 1944 when Heinrich Himmler absorbed the primary Cossack combat formations into the Waffen-SS as the XV SS Cossack Cavalry Corps.

By 1943, all Nazi-aligned Cossack units, including the civilian-heavy Kazachi Stan encampment and the combat formations, were fully integrated into the Axis framework of Nazi security warfare (Bandenbekämpfung). Under explicit directives authorizing collective punishment, these forces guarded supply corridors and conducted anti-partisan operations that resulted in numerous atrocities, including the destruction of villages, seizure of livestock, and murder of civilians across Belarus, Yugoslavia, and Poland. In occupied Belarus, units like Ivan Kononov's Kosaken-Abteilung 600 carried out reprisal campaigns, gaining recognition from German commands for their ruthless efficiency. In Yugoslavia, the 1st Cossack Cavalry Division quickly became known for its brutality and undisciplined behavior, prompting the Croat puppet authorities to agitate for its withdrawal. The Kazachi Stan supplied an infantry regiment for the suppression of the Warsaw Uprising.

In June 1944, the SS transferred the 25,000-person Kazachi Stan encampment to Carnia in northeastern Italy. Tasked by Odilo Globocnik, the Higher SS and Police Leader for Italy, with securing Axis supply lines and suppressing the local resistance, it established a puppet administration zone termed Kosakenland in Norditalien.. Cossack authorities evicted Italian residents, seized property, confiscated food, which drove many locals to join the partisans. In October 1944, a mass rape and the killing of a priest who had tried to protect the women caused a diplomatic crisis. By February 1945, Pyotr Krasnov and the Main Administration of Cossack Forces relocated to the zone from Berlin, and subsequent arrivals of Andrei Shkuro's Kosaken-Reserve reinforcements and Caucasian auxiliaries expanded the population to over 32,000 individuals before the Axis collapse..

The political and administrative leadership consisted largely of Tsarist-era White émigrés (under German control). But almost all of the rank-and-file were Soviet citizens. This population was divided between regional volunteers who joined the German forces during the 1942 Caucasus campaign and subsequently retreated west with their families and captured Red Army prisoners of war who were recruited from German Stalags.

=== Yalta Conference agreements ===
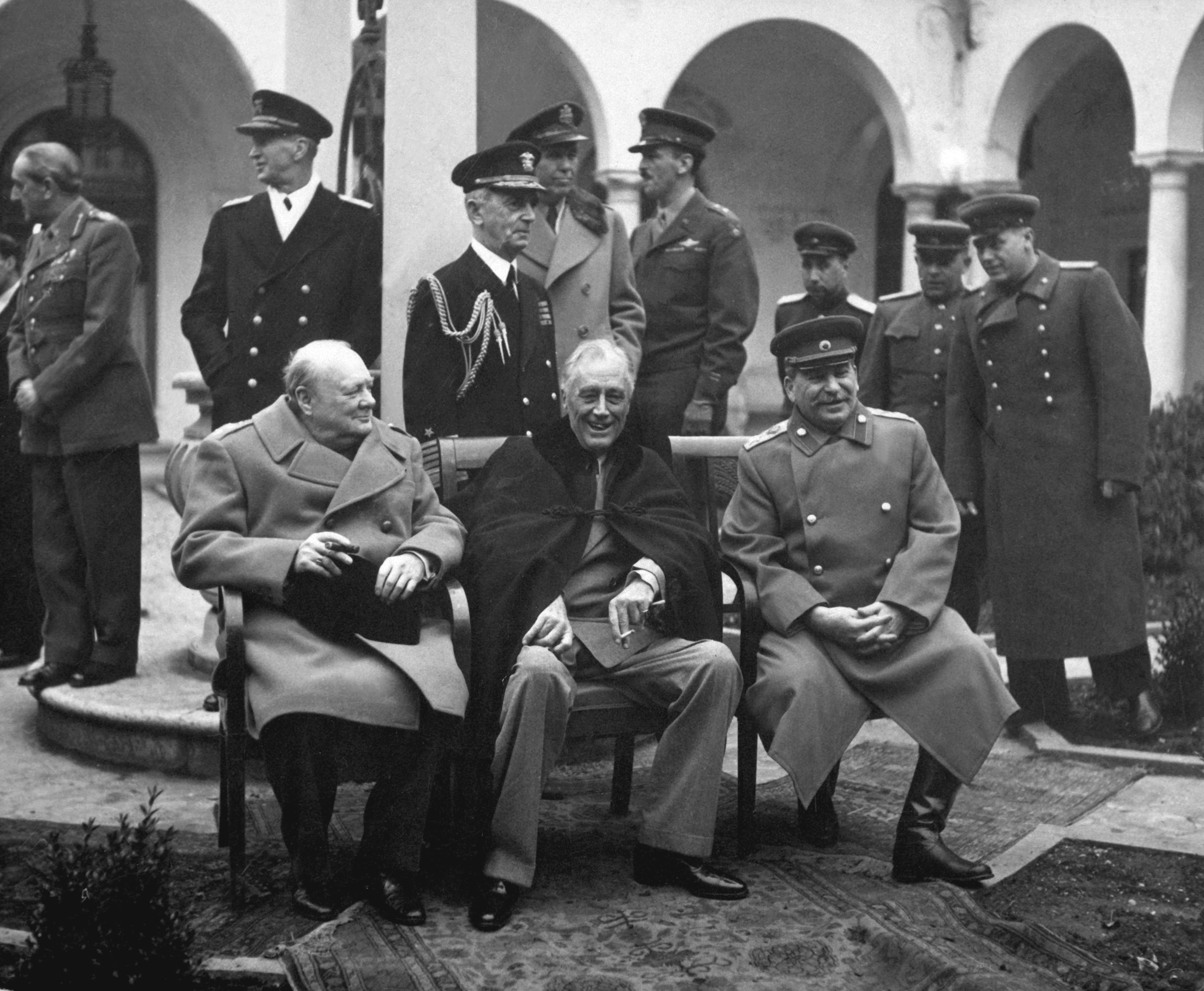
The Big Three: Churchill, Roosevelt, and Stalin at the Yalta conference.

During the Yalta Conference in February 1945, British Prime Minister Winston Churchill and US President Franklin D. Roosevelt agreed to a mutual repatriation protocol. The agreement mandated the return of all Soviet citizens to the USSR. Soviet negotiators demanded the return of personnel captured in German uniforms, branding them as traitors and war criminals. Churchill and Roosevelt complied because they wanted to ensure that the USSR returned liberated Western prisoners of war.

The Yalta agreement applied only to individuals who held Soviet citizenship as of 1 September 1939, so it did not include White Russian émigrés who had fled during the Bolshevik Revolution before the establishment of the USSR. Despite this legal boundary, the Soviet Union subsequently demanded the handover of all Cossacks captured in German uniform, making no distinction between Soviet-born citizens and "old émigrés". After Yalta, Churchill questioned Stalin, asking, "Did the Cossacks and other minorities fight against us?" Stalin replied, "They fought with ferocity, not to say savagery, for the Germans".

By May 1945, the repatriation of Western POWs from Soviet zones was well underway. To protect this process and avoid friction, American and British leaders prioritized diplomatic relations during the Cossack handovers. The first wave of 1,707 liberated Western servicemen had departed the Black Sea port of Odessa on 7 March 1945. Because this reciprocal pipeline progressed efficiently, Western leaders complied with the subsequent forced handovers to maintain Allied goodwill and ensure the return of their remaining personnel.

== Logistical and legal standoff ==
=== Surrender of Cossack formations ===
Towards the end of the war, the Cossack leadership expected the alliance between the Western Powers and the Soviet Union would collapse the moment Berlin fell, same as it did after World War I. In March 1945, Pannwitz sent a delegation to General Andrey Vlasov, commander of the collaborationist Russian Liberation Army. He thought that transferring his corps to Vlasov's Committee for the Liberation of the Peoples of Russia (KONR) would shield it from the stigma of being associated with the SS. Pannwitz hoped that this would make any alliance more palatable to the Western Allies. The formal transfer to KONR took place in late April, but had no practical effect as the war ended days later.

Fearing reprisals for their high-profile military collaboration with Nazi Germany, the Cossacks executed fighting retreats out of Italy and Yugoslavia, to reach the British zone of occupation in Carinthia, Austria. This unauthorized retreat violated the terms of the German Instrument of Surrender, which legally mandated all Axis-controlled forces to surrender to the immediate Allied commands facing them on their active fronts. Rather than surrendering to the Soviet and Yugoslav forces they were actively engaged with, both Cossack formations ignored the "stand fast" directive in an attempt to secure Western political protections.

In early May 1945, over 45,000 Cossack combatants and civilian dependents surrendered to the British V Corps. The Kazachi Stan caravan completed its surrender protocols between 8 and 10 May, as their columns crossed the alpine Plöcken Pass and entered the Drava Valley. They established their temporary encampment around Lienz. The XV SS Cossack Cavalry Corps surrendered on 11–12 May 1945, after retreating out of Yugoslavia and establishing contact with British troops near Völkermarkt, Austria. Pannwitz sought to set conditions so that his force would not be handed over to the Red Army, but his British interlocutor would have none of that. He demanded an unconditional surrender as were the terms for all German units. The 2nd SS Cossack Cavalry Division, which was covering the retreat of the 1st Division, was badly mauled in the fighting with Yugoslav Partisans but refused to surrender to them. Its final elements arrived in Austria on 15 May.

Allied protocols classified Soviet-manned Axis units as military collaborators to be handed over to the home country rather than refugees. The Kazachi Stan caravan, despite civilian dependents, was deemed a combat unit under Ataman Domanov, having been armed and integrated into the German military since 1943. Similarly, the 18,000–20,000 troops of the XV SS Cossack Cavalry Corps were disarmed and treated as prisoners of war due to their full Waffen-SS equipment and organization. During surrender negotiations, as well as afterwards, Cossack leaders and Pannwitz submitted written appeals and verbal declarations arguing that their personnel should be classified as political refugees; they requested that the Cossacks would not be transferred to the Soviet side. The British were noncommittal.

=== Austrian border crisis ===
In May 1945, the British V Corps in southern Austria faced a logistical crisis. Over 40,000 Cossacks, alongside 300,000 to 400,000 other refugees and retreating troops, arrived in the area and strained local resources. The V Corps only had 25,000 and at one point was expected to take care of up to a million of POWs and refugees. Understaffed and short on food, the British prioritized the quick removal of these military groups to stabilize the region.

A border crisis worsened the situation when Yugoslav forces crossed into Carinthia to claim its territory for Yugoslavia. They were increasingly infiltrating around Klagenfurt, Carinthia's administrative center. The Partisans seized local police weapons and took over the town's printing press, just because the V Corps had not posted sentries there for lack of troops. The British feared that the Partisans might set up their own government, but lacked resources to effectively guard key sites and administer the area. An armed conflict with an erstwhile ally seemed imminent. By 18 May, the V Corps staff had drawn up plans for just such a contingency, Operation Beehive, including border closures and seizure of the Partisans as POWs to be kept under close guard. The Yugoslav forces ultimately withdrew from Austria towards the end of the month, but remained in northern Italy, also in the British occupation zone. This necessitated continued readiness on the part of the V Corps.

The British thus viewed the swift removal of the Cossacks as both a security measure and as a means to ensure military readiness. In this chaotic and high pressure environment, decisions by the British command on the ground were made broadly. They designated the Axis formations as either consisting of "Soviet citizens" or "non-Soviet citizens", and repatriation guidelines were applied to the POWs on the basis of the unit they belonged to rather than individually. Any humanitarian concerns gave way to expediency.

=== Citizenship discrepancy ===
Controversy arose because the Cossack formations contained a mix of citizens from various countries, including those who left Russia long before the war or were never Soviet nationals. Cossack leaders, including Pyotr Krasnov, believed that a portion of their population possessed legal immunity from Soviet demands. They assumed that the Allies would respect their non-Soviet citizenship status.

The British Foreign Office sent a telegram ordering that "any person who is not (repeat not) a Soviet citizen under British law must not (repeat not) be sent back to the Soviet Union unless he expressly desires". For his part, Brigadier Toby Low, chief of staff to the British forces, issued an order stating "individual cases will not be considered unless particularly pressed ... In all cases of doubt, the individual will be treated as a Soviet national". This inclusion violated the Yalta Agreement parameters, which legally only applied to pre-1939 Soviet citizens.

This disconnect created a conflict between Allied political directives and field enforcement. Political leadership in London intended for the Yalta Treaty to protect non-Soviet nationals. Faced with a logistical emergency, the British V Corps command aimed for expediency. Having designated the Cossack formations as "Soviet nationals", British commanders used a rapid repatriation protocol without screening the population. It added to the confusion by issuing divergent orders, which were applied inconsistently by the subordinate units. This resulted in different outcomes for different groups. Consequently, the operation sent non-citizens to the USSR as "Soviet nationals" without the right to appeal.

== The handovers ==
=== Clearing of the Lienz encampments ===
The repatriation of 32,000 Kazachi Stan personnel from the Lienz-Peggetz camps relied on deception and force. British officers maintained good relations with the Cossacks and allowed them to keep internal policing weapons until 27 May. On 28 May 1945, the British removed the leadership cadre. They told 1,800 Cossack officers and camp staff to attend an administrative conference off-site. The Cossacks believed that the meeting would settle their refugee status and future Allied employment, so they complied. Instead, trucks carried them directly to a guarded transit camp at Spittal an der Drau. They were kept there overnight and handed over to the Soviet Union the next day.

On 1 June 1945, British troops arrived to clear the remaining soldiers and civilians at camps in the Drava valley. The site of former army barracks at Peggetz was the largest of the Kazachi Stan encampments at about 4,000 people. At Peggetz, as at other camps, the British encountered passive resistance; the Cossacks were grouped together with the stronger on the outside, linking arms so that they could not be removed. The British employed force against the ringleaders, using tool handles and rifle butts and giving warning shots. This generated panic, melees, and numerous injuries; several people died in the stampedes at Peggetz. British troops shot at attempted escapees; several were killed across a number of camps. A distraught Cossack attempted to grab a British soldier's rifle to kill himself; but instead the shot hit and killed a nearby person.

With resistance broken by force on the first day, the remaining transfers over 2 and 3 June proceeded without major incident. The British military records list nine deaths, while the Cossack cemetery at Lienz has 28 graves. British troops ran sweeps over the next two weeks, delivering about 2,000 of those who had evaded the earlier transports to Judenburg.

=== Transfer of the XV SS Corps ===
Initially, British troops did not guard the 18,000 to 20,000 combatants of the XV SS Cossack Cavalry Corps, just told them to stay within certain boundaries. On 15 May, British officers informed the senior commanders that the corps would likely be repatriated to the Soviet Union. Many German officers took the opportunity to desert; Pannwitz and the remainder of his staff chose to stay behind. On 26 May, British soldiers arrested Pannwitz and his staff and placed them under guard. The next day, the British military moved the rest of the corps to a high-security camp at Weitensfeld to prepare for the transfers. Officers hid the ultimate destination from the Cossacks, so the soldiers boarded the Weitensfeld-bound trucks without resistance. Over the next few days, British transports delivered the men, including Pannwitz, to Judenburg and handed them over to the Red Army.

The inconsistent treatment of the returnees resulted in some personnel being exempt from repatriation on an individual basis. On the morning of the transfer from Weitensfeld, a group of Cossack officers protested claiming they were not Soviet citizens. A tense standoff ensued, during which two more British officers arrived and stated that, indeed, émigrés were to be exempt, as per the V Corps order. Upon interrogation, about 60 officers were determined to be Civil-War era refugees, and were thus retained.

=== Parallel Allied operations ===
While the largest operations occurred in British-occupied Austria, Allied forces conducted forced repatriations of Axis military personnel, classified as Soviet nationals under the Yalta agreement. These operations spanned multiple facilities across Europe and the United States, at times encountering physical resistance from the detainees:

- Newlands Corner Camp, United Kingdom: Between late May and early June 1945, the British War Office utilized this internment facility near Guildford, Surrey, to isolate and process Cossack soldiers and auxiliary personnel captured in German uniforms. Verified Soviet citizens were transferred to domestic ports for maritime transport to the Soviet Union.
- Kempten Camp, Bavaria: On 12 August 1945, US forces used physical force to breach the camp's makeshift Orthodox church after detainees barricaded themselves inside to resist repatriation. The operation resulted in numerous injuries and suicides, ending in the transfer of 410 individuals, including Kazachi Stan militia and Cossack Schutzmannschaft personnel, to Soviet custody.
- Fort Dix, New Jersey, United States: In the summer of 1945, 154 Soviet collaborators, including Cossack troops previously interned as regular German POWs, rioted upon learning of their mandatory repatriation. Following a military police response that resulted in seven injuries and three suicides, the remaining men were transferred for repatriation on 31 August 1945.
- Plattling Displaced Persons Camp, Bavaria: On 24 February 1946, the U.S. Third Army conducted a pre-dawn raid to deport between 1,500 and 2,000 personnel, the overwhelming majority of whom belonged to the XV SS Cossack Cavalry Corps. The prisoners engaged in physical resistance and committed suicides upon realizing the transport vehicles were bound for the Soviet demarcation line.
- Operation Keelhaul: Maintained between 14 August 1946 and 9 May 1947, this intelligence and legal dragnet screened refugee streams across British and American zones in Northern Italy to isolate hidden military collaborators. The vetting process resulted in the mandatory transfer of around 1,000 individuals, some of whom were Cossack troops. Many exploited the slow screening protocols to obtain falsified documents and emigrate as international refugees. This was the last forced transfer under the overall repatriation program of Soviet citizens.

== Aftermath ==
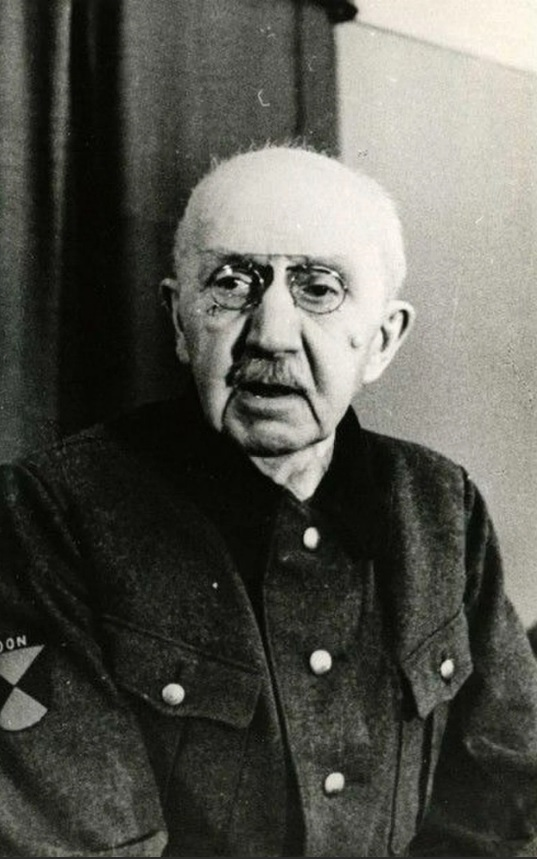
Pyotr Krasnov during trial, 1947

The British ultimately handed over 46,000 individuals, including families. The Soviet administration classified Cossack officers as "foreigners," grouping them with captured German personnel. Authorities treated rank-and-file Cossacks as Soviet citizens subject to state verification in filtration camps. 5,500 of officers and German POWs went to Prokopyevsk Camp No. 525, in the Kemerovo Region, under the Main Administration for Prisoners of War and Internees. The remaining 40,500 entered filtration camps for coal industry labor. Soviet courts later sentenced Ataman Pyotr Krasnov and his immediate inner circle to death.

=== Trial of senior leadership ===
Following their delivery into Soviet custody, SMERSH segregated the senior Cossack leadership and transported them to Moscow's Lubyanka and Lefortovo prisons. The six defendants were charged with war crimes, collaboration, high treason, and espionage against the Soviet state under Ukaz 39 and Article 58 of the Soviet penal code. They were:

- General Pyotr Krasnov, Head of the Main Administration of Cossack Forces
- General Andrei Shkuro, commander of the Cossack Reserve (Kosaken-Reserve) of the SS Main Office
- Lieutenant General Helmuth von Pannwitz, commander of the XV SS Cossack Cavalry Corps
- Major General Timofey Domanov, commander of the Kazachi Stan militia
- Major General Sultan Klych-Girey, commander of the Caucasian Volunteer Cavalry Division
- Major General Semyon Krasnov, Chief of Staff of the Main Administration of Cossack Forces.

The Military Collegium of the Supreme Court of the USSR conducted the closed trial on January 15–16, 1947. Judges found the defendants guilty and sentenced them to death. The sentence was final. The prisoners were hanged together in the courtyard of Lefortovo Prison on the evening of January 16, 1947.

=== The fighting force and civilians ===
Following the handovers at Lienz and Judenburg, NKVD and SMERSH officers processed the rank-and-file soldiers and civilian dependents through a network of filtration camps. Vetting teams ran background checks cross-referenced with captured German records. This process separated voluntary personnel from mobilized conscripts and civilian dependents.

The Soviet state designated the Cossacks as traitors and military collaborators. The higher ranked officers were sentenced under Article 58. According to survivor testimony, some officers faced execution squads before they reached the Soviet border. The rank and file, under the simplified post-war procedures, were processed administratively and received sentences of 6 to 10 years in the Gulag or "special settlements". The prisoners went to mining and timber camps in Siberia, the Urals, and the Far North. Thousands perished from malnutrition, disease, and extreme weather. The authorities permitted most civilian women and children to settle in exile zones under police surveillance. A general amnesty freed the survivors in 1955.

=== Diaspora ===
A minority of Cossacks and civilian dependents evaded the forced repatriations, blending into the chaotic landscape of post-war Western Europe. The escapees falsified their identities and obtained temporary identity cards. They hid in displaced persons camps as Polish or Baltic citizens or non-Soviet "old émigrés" who had fled Russia after the Civil War. In mid-June 1945, the Red Cross took over the administration of the south Austria camps from the military. They implemented individualized screening that exempted about 2,000 Cossacks from repatriation as non-Soviet citizens.

Over the next decades, the majority migrated via the "ratlines" and regular immigration pipelines to Australia and North and South America where they established anti-communist diaspora communities. Among the prominent figures who avoided repatriation was Vyacheslav Naumenko who surrendered separately to the US forces in Bavaria, avoided the handovers as a non-Soviet citizen, and emigrated to the US. Ivan Kononov, by then the nominal leader of all KONR Cossack forces, abandoned his command, crossed into the US occupation zone, and later emigrated to Australia under a false identity.

== Legacy ==
=== Myths and misconceptions ===
In the decades following the war, Cold War political discourse and sanitized émigré memoirs distorted the narrative of the Cossack repatriations, generating historical myths that endured long after they were debunked. Early diaspora literature portrayed the repatriated population as anti-communist political refugees. Mainstream historical research has disproved this depiction, noting that the surrendered population consisted of armed Axis combat formations: the XV SS Cossack Cavalry Corps and fighting elements of the Kazachi Stan. These units were integrated into the Nazi occupation and security apparatus, committing war crimes during security sweeps across Belarus, Yugoslavia, and northeastern Italy.

A prominent theory popularized in Nikolai Tolstoy's The Victims of Yalta alleged that Harold Macmillan, the British resident minister in the Mediterranean, and V Corps officers engineered a secret conspiracy against the non-Soviet émigrés. The 1990 Cowgill historical inquiry and the discovery of the Alexander Comstock Kirk diplomatic papers discredited this conspiracy model. The forced transfers were documented military choices driven by logistical crises on the ground. The British V Corps was under-resourced and overwhelmed; it faced an imminent border conflict with advancing Yugoslav partisans under Josip Broz Tito. Ground commanders executed blanket handovers as a logistical shortcut to clear the sector, rather than as a nefarious political plot.

The executions of high-profile Tsarist-era generals like Pyotr Krasnov and Andrei Shkuro created a misconception that the event constituted a wholesale handover of the interwar White Russian émigré diaspora. In reality, the overwhelming majority of the repatriated individuals were Soviet citizens under the Yalta Agreement's parameters. This population was primarily composed of Soviet prisoners of war who chose collaboration over starvation in German Stalags and volunteers from occupied territories mobilized during the 1942 Caucasus campaign. Only a minority, estimated at roughly 3,000 individuals or 6.5 percent, were "old émigrés" who left Russia before 1939 and held international passports or Nansen certificates.

Early anti-communist literature claimed that virtually every Cossack delivered across the demarkation line was executed by NKVD firing squads or machine-gunned at the banks of the Mur river. While hasty capital punishment probably did occur, the Soviet state processed most returnees through the NKVD filtration camp bureaucracy. Moscow isolated senior commanders for trials. The rank-and-file cavalrymen received sentences of long-term forced labor. The state distributed the majority across the Gulag network and labor colonies in Siberia and northern Russia. A significant portion of lower-tier survivors returned to Soviet society following the 1955 Nikita Khrushchev's general amnesty.

=== Narrative of "Western betrayal" ===
External image
- "British betrayal of the Cossacks", painting by Sergey Korolkov, housed by the Museum of Cossack History, New Jersey

In the decades following World War II, surviving Cossack leaders and diaspora advocates rewrote their wartime history, uncoupling their legacy from Nazi atrocities. Kuban Ataman Vyacheslav Naumenko’s text, The Great Betrayal, served as the foundation for the effort. The book refocused historical memory entirely on the tragedy of the Lienz handovers. Émigré periodicals and memoirs, aided by Western supporters, further institutionalized this myth. These texts reframed the combat formations as a defensive force, describing the German alliance as an ideological crusade against Bolshevism while omitting documented war crimes against civilians.

Cossack apologists and diaspora organizations promoted the concept of "Western betrayal", with the events surrounding the repatriation often referred to in émigré literature as the "Great Betrayal" or the "betrayal of Lienz Cossacks". These narratives painted the British as dishonorable agents who violated the trust of a politically unaware anti-communist force. By adopting this vocabulary, early émigré literature conflated the legal and diplomatic grievances of occupied sovereign nations with the status of defeated Axis combat units. Following the late 1940s, this narrative was integrated directly into the broader geopolitics of the Cold War. It successfully warped mainstream Western perception for decades and transforming a complex regional logistical and military crisis into a simplified, dramatic tale of Western moral bankruptcy and institutional conspiracy.

=== Historiography ===
Józef Mackiewicz published Kontra in London in 1957. It was the first book-length narrative dedicated to the event. Mackiewicz, an anti-communist, used a novelistic style to depict the violence of the Kazachi Stan handovers at the Lienz encampment. The book exposed the realities of British deceptions and the subsequent Soviet Gulag system. However, it simultaneously reinforced denial tropes by minimizing the Kazachi Stan's occupational role and war crimes in Italy and Belarus. The text presented the armed formation primarily through the lens of passive victimhood.

The first book about the subject based on official documentation was Operation Keelhaul in 1973 by Julius Epstein. It was based on US sources and primarily dealt with the American role in the repatriation program. Epstein alleged that Western Allies violated international law by returning anti-communist refugees and prisoners to Soviet execution squads and the Gulag. Epstein lacked access to British and American military files which were still classified and mistook the late 1946-1947 Operation Keelhaul for the entire repatriation program. While Epstein exposed real military abuses, post-1990s archival research revealed most repatriations were voluntary, and the majority of returnees were neither prosecuted nor sent to the Gulag.

In 1974 Nicholas Bethell published The Last Secret, which was also turned into a BBC documentary that aired the same year. Bethell criticized the repatriation program, accusing the British government of over-fulfilling the Yalta agreement by handing over non-Soviet citizens, but he remained careful with the evidence. The book used declassified British official records to document the scale, violence, and legal compromises of the post-war forced repatriations to the Soviet Union. Upon its release, the book received critical acclaim for breaking decades of official secrecy and generated debate in Great Britain regarding Allied ethics. The text established the baseline narrative for subsequent historiography on the event.

With The Victims of Yalta (1977), British-Russian author Nikolai Tolstoy became the most influential proponent of the Cossack victimhood narrative. He alleged that British leaders committed a humanitarian betrayal by returning over two million Soviet citizens and anti-communists to face execution or the Gulag. Tolstoy used declassified British Foreign Office and War Office records under the thirty-year rule to map the handovers at Lienz and Judenburg. However, the international bestseller relied on uncritical oral testimonies, adopting a diaspora framing that portrayed active Axis collaborators as innocent refugees. While early accounts praised the book's archival depth, later analysis deemed its conspiratorial narrative deeply flawed. The book achieved much greater mainstream popularity than Bethell's academic work, generating the public outrage that culminated in the Tolstoy v. Aldington libel trial.

=== British political controversy ===
Following up on The Victims of Yalta, Nikolai Tolstoy published the 1986 monograph The Minister and the Massacres. The book alleged that a conspiracy orchestrated by Harold Macmillan and Brigadier Toby Low (later Lord Aldington), chief of staff of the British V Corps, bypassed screening protocols to deliver non-Soviet "old émigrés" to Soviet execution or the Gulag. The book accused them of being rogue agents and war criminals. These accusations led to the 1989 Tolstoy v. Aldington libel trial, resulting in a landmark £1.5 million judgment against Tolstoy and his subsequent bankruptcy.

To resolve the raging controversy, Brigadier Anthony Cowgill formed an investigative committee with former diplomat Lord Brimelow and journalist Christopher Booker. In October 1990, the committee published its report, The Repatriations from Austria in 1945, dismantling the conspiracy narratives popularized by Nikolai Tolstoy. The report concluded that Macmillan's role was marginal and dictated by military considerations. The committee supplemented restricted British files by consulting records in the United States. Investigators located unredacted duplicates of Allied diplomatic cables in the papers of Alexander Comstock Kirk, the wartime U.S. Political Advisor to the Supreme Allied Commander Mediterranean, deposited at the National Archives and Records Administration. These documents allowed the committee to reach conclusions that disproved Tolstoy's central narrative.

Prior to this discovery, the redactions allowed Tolstoy to argue that Harold Macmillan gave an oral order during a May 13, 1945 meeting in Klagenfurt to illegally repatriate non-Soviet Cossacks. Tolstoy's thesis hinged on this claim that Macmillan ordered local British V Corps commanders to bypass screening protocols. In contrast, the unredacted cables revealed that American advisors reviewed the logistical paralysis in Carinthia, where surrendered Axis troops choked Allied supply lines. They concurred that clearing the zone of Soviet nationals was a military necessity to preserve regional stability, rather than a conspiracy to appease Joseph Stalin. The Kirk papers proved that the inclusion of the non-Soviet "old émigrés" resulted from an administrative breakdown and military shortcuts under pressure, disproving Tolstoy's claims of an intentional cover-up. Booker detailed these findings in his 1997 work A Looking-Glass Tragedy.

=== Commemoration ===
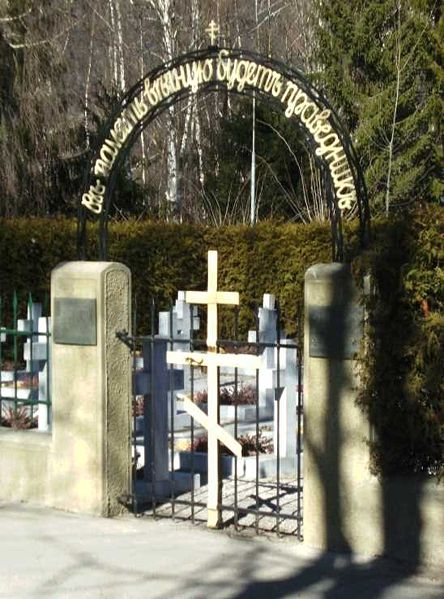
Cossack cemetery in Peggetz

In Lienz, Austria, there is a dedicated Cossack cemetery containing a stone memorial obelisk and 28 mass graves that commemorate the "Tragedy of the Drau" (Drava). These collective plots hold the remains of roughly 300 mostly unknown victims who died during the forced repatriations.

A London memorial,Twelve Responses to Tragedy, is located in the Yalta Memorial Garden at Cromwell Gardens near the Victoria & Albert Museum. Dedicated in 1982, this bronze sculpture by Angela Conner commemorates the individuals forcibly repatriated by the Western Allies to Soviet and Yugoslav authorities. The memorial was approved by Prime Minister Margaret Thatcher in May 1980, over the objections of the Foreign Office who opposed the erection on land that belonged to the Crown Estate of a monument that implicitly criticized the past actions of the British government.

In the town of Tristach, Austria, there was a memorial commemorating Pannwitz and the troops of the XV SS Cossack Cavalry Corps who were killed in action or died as POWs. This memorial was removed in September 2021 because of the connection between Pannwitz and both the SA and the SS, as well as his loyalty to the Nazi regime.

== See also ==
- Bleiburg repatriations
- Collaboration in the German-occupied Soviet Union
- Russian Monument (Liechtenstein)
- Swedish extradition of Baltic soldiers
