= The Legionnaires =

Book by Per Olov Enquist

- First edition
- Author: Per Olov Enquist
- Language: Swedish
- Subject: Swedish extradition of Baltic soldiers
- Published: 1968
- Publisher: Norstedts förlag
- Publication place: Sweden
- Awards: Nordic Council Literature Prize of 1969

The Legionnaires (Swedish: Legionärerna) is a 1968 documentary novel by Swedish author Per Olov Enquist about the Swedish extradition of Baltic soldiers shortly after the Second World War. It won the Nordic Council Literature Prize in 1969.
