= Julius Epstein =

Julius Epstein may refer to:

- Julius Epstein (pianist) (1832–1926), Austrian pianist and Professor at the Music Conservatory, Vienna
- Julius J. Epstein (1909–2000), American screenwriter
- Julius Epstein (author) (1901–1975), Austrian/American historian
