= Per Olov Enquist =

Swedish writer (1934–2020)

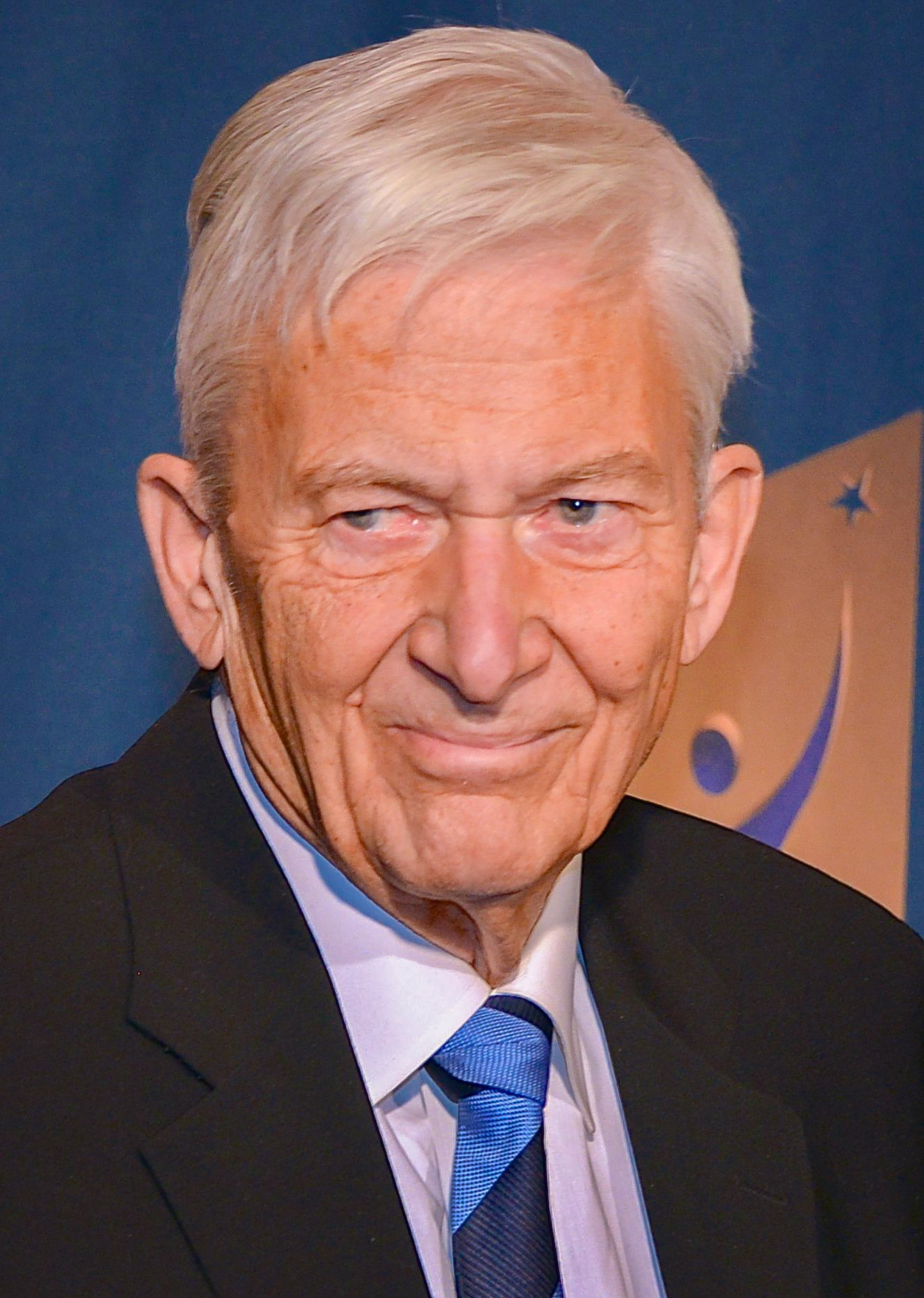
- Per Olov Enquist at the Swedish Sports Awards inside the Stockholm Globe Arena in Stockholm, Sweden in January 2013
- Born: 23 September 1934; Hjoggböle, Sweden
- Died: 25 April 2020 (aged 85); Vaxholm, Sweden
- Occupations: Journalist, playwright and novelist
- Writing career
- Language: Swedish
- Period: 1961–2020
- Notable work: The Visit of the Royal Physician

Enquist presenting himself at the Gothenburg bookfair in 2012.

Per Olov Enquist (23 September 1934 – 25 April 2020), also known as P. O. Enquist, was a Swedish author. He worked as a journalist, playwright and novelist.

== Biography ==
Enquist was born and raised in Hjoggböle, a village in present-day Skellefteå Municipality, Västerbotten. He was the only son of a single mother, a teacher in the local school who became a widow when he was half a year old. In his youth, he was a promising athlete with a high jump personal best of 1.97 meters. He studied at Uppsala University, receiving a degree in the history of literature.

During his time in Uppsala he started writing, his first novel Kristallögat being published in 1961, and became a newspaper journalist. Enquist won the Nordic Council's Literature Prize in 1968 for The Legionnaires, his account of Sweden's deportation of Baltic-country soldiers at the end of the second world war, a novel which also became his international breakthrough. Enquist was to write several more novels based on true events. He lived in Denmark from 1978 to 1993 where he was married to Danish journalist Lone Bastholm. Kapten Nemos bibliotek (1991) took inspiration from Bureåfallet where two newly born boys were accidentally switched; The Visit of the Royal Physician (1999) was based on the life of Danish King Christian VII and his physician Johann Friedrich Struensee, and Struensee's political machinations and relationship with the King's wife Caroline Matilda in the 1770s; Lewis resa (2001) covered the life of Pentecostal Lewi Pethrus; while Boken om Blanche och Marie (2004) was based on the friendship of Marie Curie and mental patient Marie "Blanche" Wittman. Enquist's first stage play was Tribadernas natt (1975), a story about Swedish author August Strindberg, his soon-to-be ex-wife Siri von Essen, and von Essen's presumed lover Marie David.

Awards for his writing have included the Dobloug Prize in 1988, the Selma Lagerlöf Prize in 1997, and the Italian Flaiano Prize in 2002. Besides books and stage plays, Enquist also wrote screenplays for motion pictures, including Pelle Erövraren (1987) and Hamsun (1996), and at the 27th Guldbagge Awards in 1993, Enquist was nominated for the award for Best Screenplay for the film Il Capitano: A Swedish Requiem. He also received the Independent Foreign Fiction Prize as well as the Nelly Sachs Prize in 2003 for The Visit of the Royal Physician. The Visit of the Royal Physician also became the first of two books by Enquist to be awarded the August Prize, the other being his 2008 autobiography Ett annat liv. Enquist was awarded the Austrian State Prize for European Literature in 2009 and the Swedish Academy's Nordic Prize in 2010.

Enquist died on 25 April 2020 after a prolonged struggle with cancer.

== Bibliography ==
- Kristallögat (1961)
- Färdvägen (1963)
- Magnetisörens femte vinter (1964). ISBN 0-7043-2721-X
- Bröderna Casey (1964). Written under the pseudonym "Peter Husberg" along with Torsten Ekbom and Leif Nylén.
- Sextiotalskritik (1966)
- Hess (1966)
- Legionärerna: En roman om baltutlämningen (1968)
- Sekonden (1971)
- Katedralen i München (1972). ISBN 91-1-725731-X
- Berättelser från de inställda upprorens tid (1974). ISBN 91-1-741212-9
- Tribadernas natt (1975)
- Chez Nous (1976). ISBN 91-1-761481-3
- Musikanternas uttåg (1978). ISBN 0-7043-0190-3
- Mannen på trottoaren (1979). ISBN 91-1-791381-0
- Till Fedra (1980). Based on the myth of Phaedra. ISBN 91-1-801061-X
- Från regnormarnas liv (1981)
- En triptyk (1981). A collection of his works Tribadernas natt, Till Fedra, and Från regnormarnas liv. ISBN 91-1-811312-5
- Doktor Mabuses nya testamente (1982). ISBN 91-1-811762-7
- Strindberg. Ett liv (1984). ISBN 91-1-841622-5
- Nedstörtad ängel (1985). ISBN 0-7043-2612-4
- Två reportage om idrott (1986). ISBN 91-1-861652-6
- Protagoras sats (1987). ISBN 91-1-871292-4
- I lodjurets timma (1988). ISBN 91-1-881241-4
- Kapten Nemos bibliotek (1991). ISBN 0-7043-7019-0
- Kartritarna (1992). ISBN 91-1-921562-2
- Bildmakarna (1998)
- Livläkarens besök (1999). ISBN 0-09-944705-3
- Lewis resa (2001). ISBN 1-58567-341-2
- De tre grottornas berg (2003)
- Boken om Blanche och Marie (2004). ISBN 91-1-301360-2 English translation as The Book about Blanche and Marie, 2006 ISBN 1-58567-668-3
- Ett annat liv ("A different life", autobiography) (2008). ISBN 91-1-301893-0
- Den tredje grottans hemlighet (2010)
- Liknelseboken (2013). ISBN 978-91-1-304951-9
