= Anthony Cowgill =

Anthony Wilson Cowgill MBE (7 November 1915 – 29 October 2009) was a British soldier, engineer and researcher. After a 30-year career in the Army he worked for Rolls-Royce and set up a company offering information and access to government. Past retirement age he initiated his own private inquiry into the Repatriation of Cossacks after World War II, and published the English texts of European Union treaties.

== World War II service ==
Cowgill was the son of a mill manager from Yorkshire, and studied at Bradford Grammar School and then Manchester Grammar School before studying mining engineering at the University of Birmingham. He joined the army shortly before the outbreak of the Second World War, being promoted to Lieutenant in the Royal Army Ordnance Corps in 1941. Cowgill later transferred to the Royal Electrical and Mechanical Engineers and spent a year in Canada working on waterproofing tanks ready for D-Day. He was himself in France after D-Day and was present at the German surrender at Lüneburg Heath on 4 May 1945.

== Later career ==
Early in 1945 Cowgill was awarded an MBE. He served in India on the Partition Commission, and in the Korean War, retiring from the Army with the rank of Brigadier in April 1969. Cowgill then joined Rolls-Royce Limited as chief industrial engineer, taking responsibility for developing the Rolls-Royce RB211 jet engine; the costs of the project caused the company to go under and led to its nationalisation in 1971.

== British Management Data Foundation ==
Having conducted a joint study project with several companies in the 1960s, Cowgill set up the British Work Measurement Data Foundation in 1970. This body led on in 1979 to the British Management Data Foundation, which Cowgill and his son Andrew ran from home in the Cotswolds. The foundation provides briefing on public policy issues, and also kept subscribers in touch with the highest level of government via briefings with Bernard Ingham, then Press Secretary to Prime Minister Margaret Thatcher. After Ingham's retirement, Cowgill disclosed the briefings, describing them as "invariably of great value".

== Inquiry into World War II repatriations ==
In 1986 Nikolai Tolstoy published The Minister and the Massacres, a history of the handovers of Cossack forces who had collaborated with Nazi Germany. Tolstoy accused former Prime Minister Harold Macmillan of conspiring to go beyond the agreement at the Yalta Conference and send anti-Soviet troops to their deaths. When he read the book, Cowgill was shocked and formed an independent commission of inquiry to determine the truth. Tolstoy at first co-operated with the inquiry, sharing documents and contact details for surviving witnesses. Cowgill's conclusion, outlined in an initial report in September 1988 and a final report in October 1990, was that the repatriations were in line with policy, there had been no conspiracy and Macmillan's role was minimal.

== European treaties ==
At the time of the controversy over British ratification of the Maastricht Treaty, Cowgill reacted to the complaints that MPs were being asked to approve a treaty they had not read (and which the government refused to publish) by obtaining and publishing the text showing how it would amend the consolidated Treaty of Rome. Copies were sent to every MP by Sir Keith Joseph and Henry Kissinger was said to have admired the enterprise. The British Management Data Foundation has gone on to publish similar analysis of later EU treaties. Cowgill endorsed 'Business for Sterling' when they were set up in 1998 to oppose British participation in the Euro.
