= Order No. 270 =

1941 Soviet Army command prohibiting surrender

Order No. 270 (Russian: Приказ № 270, romanized: Prikaz No. 270), entitled "On the responsibility of military personnel for surrendering and leaving weapons to the enemy" (Об ответственности военнослужащих за сдачу в плен и оставление врагу оружия, Ob otvetstvennosti voyennosluzhashchikh za sdachu v plen i ostavleniye vragu oruzhiya) issued on 16 August 1941, by Joseph Stalin during the Axis invasion of the Soviet Union, ordered Red Army personnel to "fight to the death", virtually banned commanders from surrendering, and set out severe penalties for senior officers and deserters regarded as derelicting their duties. Order 270 is widely regarded as the basis of subsequent, often controversial Soviet policies regarding prisoners of war.

== Overview ==
During the pre-war period, the efficiency and morale of Red Army command staff was low as a result of Stalin's purges. By August 1941, Axis forces had achieved overwhelming successes in their advancement deep into Soviet territory. Their successful blitzkrieg strategy disorganized the Soviet defense system, led to the encirclement of numerous Soviet units, including whole field armies.

Stalin issued the order in his capacity as People's Commissar of Defence. The order was aimed primarily at rapidly raising the effectiveness and morale of officers.

In the preamble, the order gives examples of troops fighting in encirclement, as well as cases of surrender by military command. The first article directed that any commanders or commissars "tearing away their insignia and deserting or surrendering" should be considered malicious deserters. The order required superiors to shoot these deserters on the spot. Their family members were subjected to arrest. Order 270 required encircled soldiers to use every possibility to fight on, and to demand that their commanders fight on and organize resistance to the enemy.

According to the order, anyone attempting to surrender instead of fighting on must be destroyed and their family members deprived of any state welfare and assistance. The order also required division commanders to demote and, if necessary, even to shoot on the spot those commanders who failed to command a battle directly in the battlefield.

10,000 Soviet soldiers were executed as a result of this order in the first months of the war alone.

== See also ==
- Order No. 227
- Soviet repressions against former prisoners of war
- German mistreatment of Soviet prisoners of war
- Wikisource:ru:Приказ СВГК СССР № 270 от 16.08.41 (The original text in Russian at Wikisource.)
