= The Coming of the King =

1988 novel by Nikolai Tolstoy

- First edition
- Author: Nikolai Tolstoy
- Cover artist: Kevin Tweddell
- Language: English
- Series: Books of Merlin
- Publisher: Bantam Press
- Publication date: 1988
- Publication place: United Kingdom
- Pages: 606 p.
- ISBN: 0553283952

The Coming of the King: The First Book of Merlin is a 1988 historical fantasy novel by Nikolai Tolstoy drawing upon Arthurian legend and more broadly, Celtic and Germanic mythology. The novel is the first in an as-yet unfinished trilogy.

Tolstoy is also the author of the 1985 nonfiction The Quest for Merlin, which explores the historical roots of Merlin.

== Plot summary ==
Set in 6th century Europe after Arthur's death, the novel retells part of Merlin's life using the Black Book of Carmarthen, Robert de Boron, Geoffrey of Monmouth, and other sources. Elements of the childhood of Taliesin are also used. The novel covers Merlin's life from infancy to adulthood as well as British and Saxon conflicts, climaxing with a battle at Dineirth in Wales.

Historical and legendary figures appearing in the novel include Cynric of Wessex, Maelgun Gwynedd, Beowulf and Taliesin himself. Merlin serves as mentor to Maelgun instead of Arthur as popularized by Thomas Malory and others. The novel also features mythological figures like the gods Woden and Lir as characters.

== Sequels ==
The second novel in the trilogy, tentatively titled The Thirteen Treasures, is planned to feature Merlin's search for the Thirteen Treasures of Britain and involves him meeting the dead Arthur through shamanism. The third novel is planned to cover Merlin's stay in the Caledonian Forest where he finally dies a "triple death".

As of 1989, Tolstoy stated his work on the succeeding novels was being delayed by a libel case involving alleged British war crimes. The novels are unlikely to ever be undertaken, due to Tolstoy's age.
