= Ett annat liv =

2008 autobiography by Per Olov Enquist

- First edition
- Author: Per Olov Enquist
- Language: Swedish
- Published: 2008
- Publisher: Norstedts förlag
- Publication place: Sweden
- Awards: August Prize of 2008

Ett annat liv (lit. A Different Life) is a 2008 autobiography by the Swedish author Per Olov Enquist. It received the August Prize in 2008.
