= The Minister and the Massacres =

1986 book by Nikolai Tolstoy

- First edition
- Author: Nikolai Tolstoy
- Genre: Non-fiction
- Publisher: Century Hutchinson
- Publication date: 1986

The Minister and the Massacres (1986) is a history written by Nikolai Tolstoy about the 1945 repatriations of Croatian soldiers and civilians and Cossacks, who had crossed into Austria in order to surrender to the Western Allies, rather than to the Red Army or Yugoslav Partisans. He criticized the British repatriation of collaborationist troops to Josip Broz Tito's Yugoslav government, attributing the decisions to Harold Macmillan, then UK minister of the Mediterranean, and Lord Aldington. Tolstoy is among historians who say numerous massacres of such soldiers took place after their repatriation. His conclusions about leading British officials were criticized in turn.

In this history, Tolstoy continued his exploration of late world war history. His earlier books were Victims of Yalta (1977) and Stalin's Secret War (1981). Lord Aldington later filed a libel lawsuit against Tolstoy and a man he had written for. He refused to settle and was found to have libelled Aldington at trial, and ordered to pay damages.

== Contents ==
Tolstoy accused Harold Macmillan, then "minister resident" in the Mediterranean and future prime minister of the United Kingdom, of persuading British General Alexander to ignore a telegram of the Foreign Office that would have restricted repatriation of certain refugees. It recommended not repatriating individuals who were not Soviet citizens by British law. Application of this would have divided the Cossacks into émigrés and those from the Soviet Union, the former, not subject to repatriation. Tolstoy also criticised Lord Aldington, who he claimed gave a key order on 21 May 1945 that made all of the Cossacks subject to repatriation.

In referencing the documents of that time, Tolstoy quoted a General Alexander telegram, sent to the Combined Chiefs of Staff, in which Alexander mentioned "25,000 German and Croat units". In a second telegram sent to the Combined Chiefs of Staff, Alexander asked for guidelines regarding the final disposition of “50,000 Cossacks including 11,000 women, children and old men; present estimate of total 35,000 Chetniks – 11,000 of them already evacuated to Italy – and 25,000 German and Croat units.” The telegram said that in each of above cases, “returning them to their country of origin immediately might be fatal to their health.”

Tolstoy "reconstructed what happened when, on May 31, the commandant of the military camp at Viktring, 'Lieutenant Ames', reported that he had received orders for 2,700 of the civilian refugees in Major Barre's camp to be taken to Rosenbach and Bleiburg the following day, to be handed over to Tito's partisans."

== Reception ==
British reviewers of Tolstoy's history noted what they thought were weaknesses in his book, influenced by his having been among the victims of losses in the Soviet Union following the Russian Revolution. They suggested that he over-identified with the victims of repatriation, whose numbers are disputed.

Alistair Horne wrote:

Trying to weave a way through the tangled cobweb of truths, half-truths, and downright inaccuracies woven by Tolstoy proved to be one of the longest and most arduous tasks I have ever undertaken as a writer.
[...] his writing came increasingly to reveal a fanatical obsessiveness that was more Slav than Anglo-Saxon. Appalled by the injustice inflicted upon his fellow White Russians, and dedicated to the cause of seeing that it should be requited on a public platform, Tolstoy progressively persuaded himself that the repatriations had flowed from an evil conspiracy.
[...] in it [The Minister and the Massacres] Tolstoy jeopardized what claim he had to be a serious and objective historian by his tendency to shape the facts around conclusions he had already formed.

Stevan K. Pavlowitch wrote:

The story, as told by Nikolai Tolstoy in his most controversial book, The Minister and the Massacres (London: Century Hutchinson, 1986), is apocalyptic, at the level of the massacres, and shady, at the level of British officialdom. It is a tale that should be told and clarified. The trouble is that the author identifies so strongly with the victims that he is obsessed with the need to find and name the individuals who, on the British side, were ultimately responsible for their fate. [...] Tolstoy's book is history seen from the point of view of the victims, and as the survivors now wish it to be remembered. [...] Tolstoy does not believe that there was a generally accepted 'deal' with Tito, for which he can find no explicit evidence, and he prefers to believe in a 'conspiracy', for which he can find no motive.

After reading the book, Brigadier General Anthony Cowgill held his own independent, unofficial inquiry into the events. Tolstoy at first co-operated with the inquiry, sharing documents and contact details for surviving witnesses. Cowgill concluded, as outlined in an initial report in September 1988 and a final report in October 1990, that the repatriations were in line with UK policy. He said there had been no conspiracy and Macmillan's role was minimal.

One of Cowgill's inquiry team was Christopher Booker, who had initially supported Tolstoy. Booker wrote in more detail in A Looking Glass Tragedy. The Controversy over the Repatriations from Austria in 1945, arguing in relation to Bleiburg that "many 'massacres' described in lurid detail never took place". He said that Tolstoy had distorted the account contrary to the facts, and that there are no traces in the archives of any massacre ever committed in or around Bleiburg or its surroundings (only nine documents in the British Army archives relate to Bleiburg in May 1945). Booker notes Tolstoy's reliance on three eyewitnesses, who were describing events 40 years before and who were very partial.

Almost simultaneously, author Ian Mitchell wrote in The Cost of a Reputation (1997) (about the ensuing libel case) that the archives had been weeded of most of the incriminating documents, but he criticised Tolstoy for concluding his book with the allegation that Macmillan was an ally of the Soviet Union's NKVD.

Laurence Rees wrote a book about World War II. In response to Booker, he said that historians should treat every source they use skeptically, and that applies to written sources as much as eye-witness accounts. As an example, he noted the following account.

Nigel Nicolson, a British officer with 3 Battalion, Welsh Guards, who took part in the infamous forced repatriations from Austria in the summer of 1945, said to me that he had deliberately falsified the historical record at the time, writing that the Yugoslavian deportees had been offered ‘light refreshments’ by their Tito Communist guards. He’d done this because he had been ordered not to tell the truth in his military report – that the deportees were being appallingly treated – and so had written something that he thought was so ludicrous – how could the deportees be given ‘light refreshments? – that future historians would know he was being ironic. But, before Mr Nicolson admitted what he’d done, some historians had taken his written report at face value and used it to try and ‘prove’ that the surviving deportees who now spoke of how badly they had been treated were lying. If Nigel Nicolson hadn’t told the truth years later then that inaccurate report would still be in the written archives and the suffering of the deportees still disputed. So my advice is to be as careful of the accuracy of written archives as you are careful of the accuracy of people.

== Libel case ==
Tolstoy had been in contact with a property developer, Nigel Watts, who had a dispute with Lord Aldington over an unpaid insurance claim (Aldington was chairman of Sun Alliance). In his dispute with Aldington, Watts sought to attack his character by drawing together the accusations made in The Minister and the Massacres. Tolstoy wrote a 2,000-word text for him, which Watts published as a pamphlet entitled "War Crimes and the Wardenship of Winchester College", which he distributed to anyone he thought might have heard of Aldington.

In 1989, Lord Aldington, a former post-war Chairman of the Conservative Party, and subsequently Chairman of Sun Alliance, commenced a libel action against Watts. Although Tolstoy was not the initial target of the action, he joined Watts as defendant. Aldington also sued Century Hutchinson as publishers of The Minister and the Massacres. In June 1989, before the pamphlet case came to trial, Century Hutchinson settled the case by paying £30,000 damages and agreeing not to republish Tolstoy's book.

Watts withdrew and settled. Tolstoy continued to trial, lost, and was ordered to pay £2 million (£1.5 million in damages and £0.5 million in costs). Tolstoy declared himself bankrupt and made no payments, 'while continuing to live in his big house, and send his children to expensive schools.'

Tolstoy sought to appeal on the basis of new evidence, which he claimed proved Aldington had perjured himself over the date of his departure from Austria in May 1945. This was ruled inadmissible at a hearing in the High Courts of Justice, from which the press and public were barred, and his application for an appeal was rejected.

In July 1995, the European Court of Human Rights concluded unanimously that the British Government had violated Tolstoy's rights in respect of Article 10 of the Convention on Human Rights, although this referred strictly to the amount of the damages awarded against him and did not overturn the guilty verdict of his libel action. The Times commented in a leading article:

In its judgment yesterday in the case of Count Nikolai Tolstoy, the European Court of Human Rights ruled against Britain in important respects, finding that the award of £1.5 million levelled against the Count by a jury in 1989 amounted to a violation of his freedom of expression. Parliament will find the implications of this decision difficult to ignore.

The Sunday Times reported in 1996 that documents obtained after these events from the Ministry of Defence (MoD) by Tolstoy's backers suggested that under Government instructions, files that could have had a bearing on the defence case might have been withdrawn from the Public Record Office and retained by the MoD and Foreign Office throughout the run-up to and during the libel trial.

Tolstoy refused to pay anything in libel damages to Lord Aldington while the latter was alive. On 9 December 2000, two days after Aldington's death, Tolstoy paid £57,000 to the man's estate.

In Lord Aldington's obituary, Andrew Roth said that Tolstoy's criticism of Aldington was misdirected and should have been directed at Macmillan and Winston Churchill.

== Sources ==
- Tolstoy, Nikolai (1986). The Minister and the Massacres. Hutchinson. ISBN 978-0-09-164010-1.
- Booker, Christopher (1997). A Looking-Glass Tragedy. The Controversy Over The Repatriations From Austria In 1945. London: Gerald Duckworth & Co Ltd.
- Musgrove, D., ed. (2009). BBC History Magazine, Falsified Yugoslav Handover to Tito. Bristol: BBC Worldwide Publications. ISBN 978-0-9562036-2-5.
