= Nikolai Tolstoy =

British nobleman, writer, and politician

Count Nikolai Tolstoy FRSL
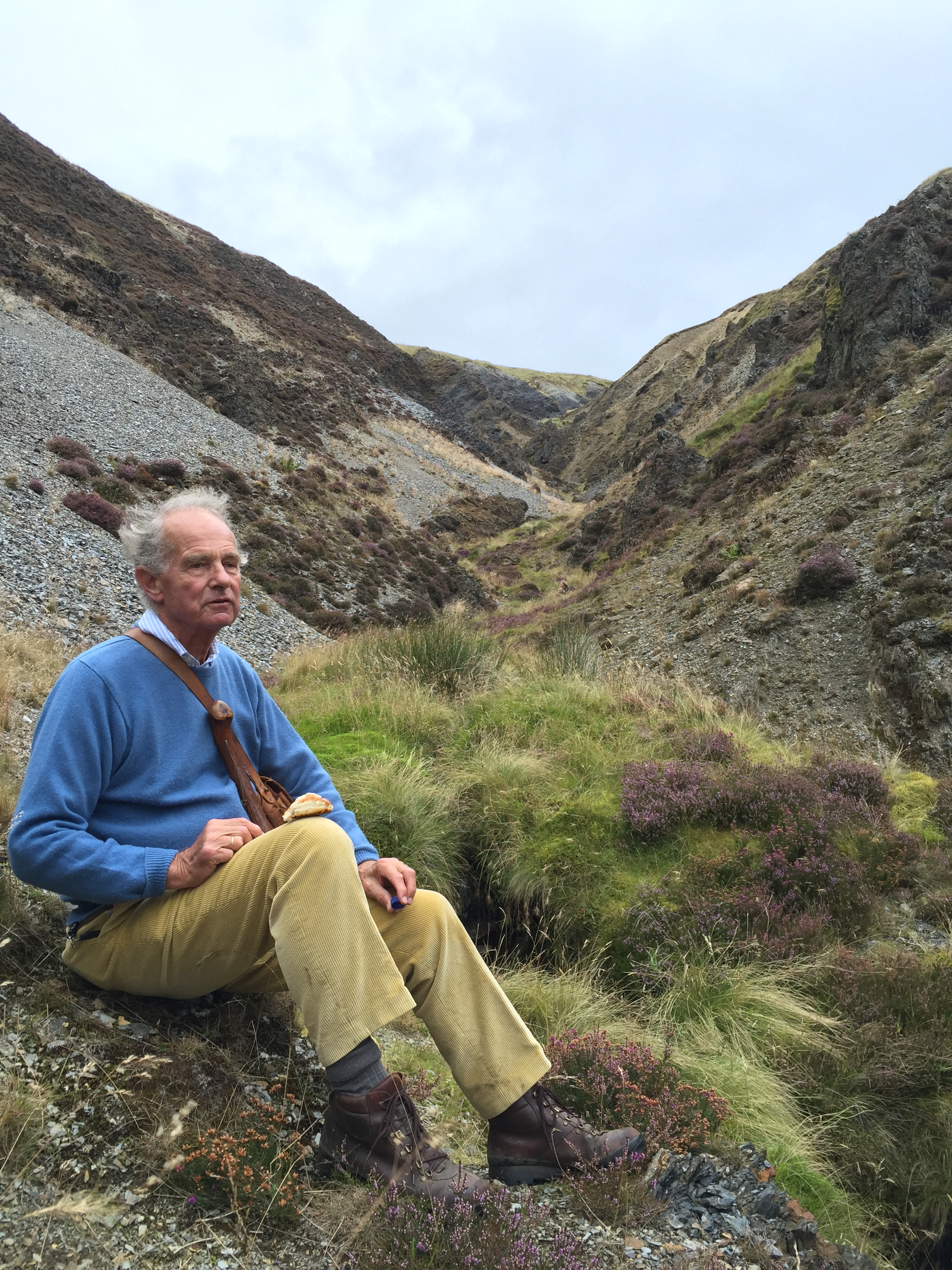
- Count Tolstoy on Hart Fell, Scotland, 2015

Head of the House of Tolstoy
- Preceded by: Count Dmitri Tolstoy

Chancellor of the IML
- Incumbent
- Assumed office 1987
- Preceded by: Kenneth McLennan Hay

Personal details
- Born: 23 June 1935 (age 91) London, England
- Party: Conservative (1991–96); UKIP (1996–present)
- Spouse: Georgina Brown
- Children: 4, including Countess Alexandra
- Parent(s): Count Dimitri Tolstoy; Mary Wicksteed
- Education: Trinity College Dublin
- Profession: Historian, writer
- Awards: Adèle Mellen Prize (2009)
- Notable work: Victims of Yalta (1977); The Minister and the Massacres (1986)

Nikolai Dmitrievich Tolstoy-Miloslavsky (Russian: Граф Николай Дмитриевич Толстой-Милославский; born 23 June 1935) is a Russian–British historian and writer. He is a former parliamentary candidate for the UK Independence Party and is the current nominal head of the House of Tolstoy, a Russian noble family.

== Early life ==
Born in London on 23 June 1935, Tolstoy is of part Russian descent. The son of Count Dimitri Tolstoy and Mary Wicksteed, he is a member of the noble Tolstoy family. He grew up as the stepson of the novelist Patrick O'Brian, whom his mother married after his parents divorced.

On his upbringing he has written:

Like thousands of Russians in the present century, I was born and brought up in another country and was only able to enter the land of my ancestors as a visitor in later years. It was nevertheless a very Russian upbringing, one which impressed on me the unusual nature of my inheritance. (...) Somewhere there was a real Russian land to which we all belonged, but it was shut away over distant seas and space of years.

Tolstoy holds dual British and Russian citizenship. He was educated at Wellington College, the Royal Military Academy Sandhurst and Trinity College Dublin.

== Literary career ==
Tolstoy has written a number of books about Celtic mythology. In The Quest for Merlin he has explored the character of Merlin, and his Arthurian novel The Coming of the King builds on his research into ancient British history and Welsh mythology. He was elected a Fellow of the Royal Society of Literature in 1979.

He has also written about the Second World War and its immediate aftermath. In 1977 he wrote Victims of Yalta, (Note: See Worsthorne, Peregrine (June 1980). "Victims of Yalta by Nikolai Tolstoy". Encounter (book review): 89–92. "More than enough has now emerged about the Russian deportations to stir the national conscience, and the matter cannot be left as it is. If a new war crime on this scale had suddenly come to light in Germany, Britain would be the first to agitate for an inquiry; indeed for much more than that... if honour, at this late stage, can never be redeemed, at least dishonour can be squarely faced.") which criticised the Allied program of repatriation of Soviet citizens after World War II.

In 1986, Tolstoy wrote The Minister and the Massacres, which examined the British Bleiburg repatriations to Josip Broz Tito's Yugoslav government. While reviewers respected Tolstoy's initial archival findings in the Victims of Yalta, mainstream historians quickly rejected the core thesis of The Minister and the Massacres. Tolstoy explicitly accused high-ranking British figures, most notably Lord Aldington (Toby Low) and Harold Macmillan (who in his later career became the Prime Minister), of being the masterminds of a deliberate, malicious, and illegal conspiracy to hand over vulnerable refugees to certain death. Academic critics argued that Tolstoy had abandoned objective historical methodology, letting an ideological obsession warp complex wartime bureaucratic logistics into an unproven tale of personal moral villainy. English-language scholarship and military reviewers immediately targeted the book's heavily polemical, emotional tone. Critics noted that Tolstoy frequently ignored contrary evidence, over-relied on selective oral histories, and treated unverified émigré rumors as factual certainties to build his case against the British government.

== Controversy ==
Tolstoy has written of the forced repatriation of Soviet citizens and others during and after the Second World War. As a result, he was called by the defence as an expert witness at the 1986–88 trial of John Demjanjuk in Israel. In a letter to the Daily Telegraph (21 April 1988), Tolstoy said the trial and the court's procedures struck "at the most vital principles of natural justice". He condemned the use of especially bussed-in audiences, who were repeatedly permitted by Judge Levin, the judge of the trial, to boo and hiss at appropriate moments. He called Levin's conduct "an appalling travesty of every principle of equity", and said that it was "a show trial in every sense of the word", even being conducted in a theatre.

In 1989 Lord Aldington, previously a British officer (chief-of-staff to General Charles Keightley), and a former chairman of the Conservative Party and of the Sun Alliance insurance company, commenced a libel action over allegations of war crimes made by Tolstoy in a pamphlet distributed by Nigel Watts, a man in dispute with Sun Alliance on an insurance matter, entitled "War Crimes and the Wardenship of Winchester College". Although Tolstoy was not the initial target of the libel action, he insisted in joining Watts as defendant because, Tolstoy later wrote, Watts was not a historian and so would have been unable to defend himself. Tolstoy lost and was ordered to pay £2 million to Lord Aldington (£1.5 million in damages and £0.5 million in costs). This sum was over three times any previous award for libel.

According to the historian Bob Moore, although the forced repatriations did occur, Tolstoy's intention was to minimise the culpability of the Cossacks had collaborated with Nazi Germany, and in doing so he had undertaken manipulation of the sources and made "outrageous claims" that were exposed during the trial.

Tolstoy delayed payment by appealing to fifteen courts in Britain and Europe. The European Court of Human Rights ruled that the size of the penalty violated his right to freedom of expression. Documents subsequently obtained from the Ministry of Defence suggested that, under Government instructions, files that could have had a bearing on the defence case might have been withdrawn from the Public Record Office and retained by the Ministry of Defence and the Foreign Office throughout the run-up to the trial and the trial itself.

Tolstoy sought to appeal on the basis of new evidence which he claimed proved Aldington had perjured himself over the date of his departure from Austria in May 1945. This was ruled inadmissible at a hearing in the High Courts of Justice, from which the press and public were barred, and his application for an appeal was rejected.

In July 1995 the European Court of Human Rights decided unanimously that the British government had violated Tolstoy's rights in respect of Article 10 of the Convention on Human Rights. It ordered the government to pay Tolstoy compensation of 40,000 Swiss francs and £70,000. This decision referred only to the amount of the damages for libel awarded against him and did not overturn the verdict of the libel action. The Times commented:

"In its judgment yesterday in the case of Count Nikolai Tolstoy, the European Court of Human Rights ruled against Britain in important respects, finding that the award of £1.5 million levelled against the Count by a jury in 1989 amounted to a violation of his freedom of expression. Parliament will find the implications of this decision difficult to ignore."

Tolstoy refused to pay any libel damages while Lord Aldington was alive. It was not until 9 December 2000, two days after Aldington's death, that Tolstoy, under court order, was forced to pay £57,000 to Aldington's estate.

== Political activity ==
A committed monarchist, Tolstoy is Chancellor of the International Monarchist League. In 1978 he was guest-of-honour at the Eldon League (founded by Neil Hamilton while a student at Cambridge), and appeared to respond to the Russian Tsarist toast "Autocracy, Orthodoxy and Nationalism" (also a motto of the League). He was also chairman of the London-based Russian Monarchist League, and chaired their annual dinner on 6 March 1986, when the guest-of-honour was the MP John Biggs-Davison. He was also in the chair for their Summer Dinner on 4 June 1987, at the Oxford and Cambridge Club in Pall Mall.

Tolstoy was a founding committee member (January 1989) of the now established War and Peace Ball, held annually in London, which raises funds for White Russian charities. A member of the Royal Stuart Society since 1954, he is presently one of the vice-presidents.

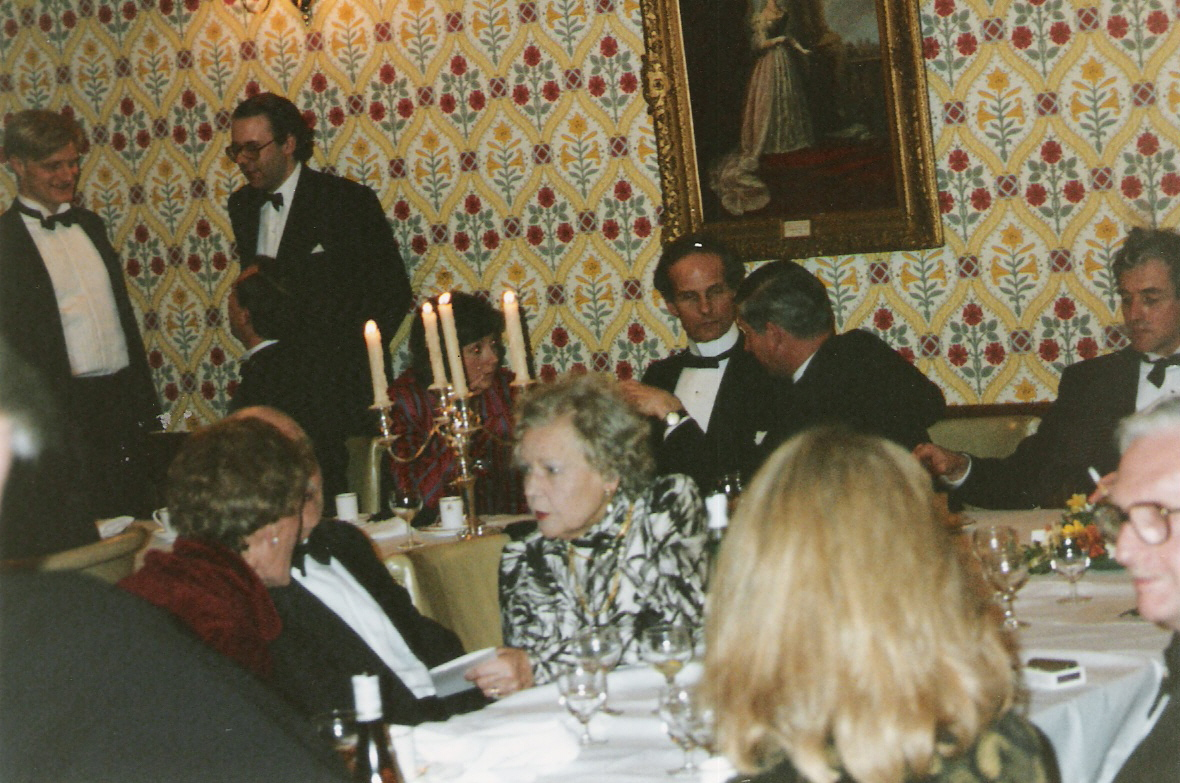
Top table L to R: Christopher Arkell & Lord Nicholas Hervey (standing) Gregory Lauder-Frost (speaking to Arkell), Countess Georgina Tolstoy, Count Nikolai Tolstoy (under painting) unknown man, Lord Sudeley, at the Russian Monarchist League Annual Dinner in 1990

In October 1987 he was presented with the International Freedom Award by the United States Industrial Council Educational Foundation: "for his courageous search for the truth about the victims of totalitarianism and deceit." In October 1991, Tolstoy joined a Conservative Monday Club delegation, under the auspices of the club's Foreign Affairs Committee, and travelled to observe the war between Serbia and Croatia, the first British political delegation to observe that conflict.

The Conservative MPs Andrew Hunter, and Roger Knapman, then a junior minister in the Conservative government (and from 2002 to 2006 leader of the UK Independence Party), were also part of the delegation which, after going to the front lines in the Sisak region, was entertained by President Franjo Tuđman and the Croatian government in Zagreb.

On 13 October the group held a Press Conference at the Hotel Intercontinental in Zagreb, which apart from the media, was also attended by delegates from the French government. A report on the conflict was agreed and handed in to 10 Downing Street by Andrew Hunter.

Tolstoy has stood unsuccessfully for the Eurosceptic and populist UK Independence Party (UKIP) as a parliamentary candidate in four British general elections, having first been asked by UKIP founder Alan Sked in November 1996. Tolstoy was subsequently UKIP's candidate for the Barnsley East by-election in 1996; where he received 2.1% of the vote, and for Wantage in the 1997 (0.8%), 2001 (1.9%) and 2005 general elections (1.5%). Tolstoy stood for UKIP in Witney at the 2010 general election – against David Cameron – and received 3.5% of the vote.

In 2024 Tolstoy accepted Patronage of The Peel Club, a conservative organisation in Pall Mall, London.

== Family ==
Tolstoy is the head of the senior branch of the Tolstoy family, being descended from Ivan Andreyevich Tolstoy (1644–1713). He is a distant cousin to the author Leo Tolstoy (1828–1910) as Leo Tolstoy was descended from Pyotr Andreyevich Tolstoy (1645–1729), the younger brother of Ivan. Tolstoy's great-grandfather, Pavel Tolstoy-Miloslavsky, was chamberlain to the last Emperor, Nicholas II of Russia, who had declared his intention of creating him a Count for his services, but this was deferred due to the growing crisis in Russia during the First World War. When Grand Duke Kiril succeeded to the imperial inheritance and rights, he granted Pavel Tolstoy-Miloslavsky the title, an elevation which was approved by the Dowager Empress Maria Feodorovna and by Nicholas II's sisters Xenia and Olga. Tolstoy's father, Count Dimitri Tolstoy, escaped from Russia in 1920 and settled in the United Kingdom, granted British nationality in September 1946. He entered the legal profession, was called to the bar, and later appointed a Queen's Counsel.

Tolstoy himself is married and has four children:

- Alexandra (born 1973), a broadcaster, equine adventurer, and former socialite.
- Anastasia (born 1975), married with two children.
- Dmitri (born 1978),
- Xenia, Lady Buckhurst (born 1980) married since 2010 to the elder son and heir of the Earl De La Warr, William Sackville, Lord Buckhurst, with whom she has two children

== Works ==
- The Founding of Evil Hold School, London, 1968, ISBN 0-491-00371-4
- Night of the Long Knives, New York, 1972, ISBN 0-345-02787-6, concerning the Nazi purge of 1934
- Victims of Yalta, originally published in London, 1977. Revised edition 1979. ISBN 0-552-11030-2, published in the US as The Secret Betrayal, Charles Scribner's Sons, New York, 1977, ISBN 0-684-15635-0.
- The Half-Mad Lord: Thomas Pitt, 2nd Baron Camelford (1775–1804), London, 1978, ISBN 0-224-01664-4
- Stalin's Secret War, London, 1981, ISBN 0-224-01665-2
- The Tolstoys – 24 Generations of Russian History, 1353–1983 by Nikolai Tolstoy, London, 1983, ISBN 0-241-10979-5
- The Quest for Merlin, 1985, ISBN 0-241-11356-3
- The Minister and the Massacres, London, 1986, ISBN 0-09-164010-5
- The Coming of the King, London, 1988, ISBN 0-593-01312-3
- Patrick O'Brian: The Making of the Novelist, London 2004, ISBN 0-7126-7025-4 The first volume of a biography of his late stepfather, Patrick O'Brian, the novelist famous for the Aubrey-Maturin series of historical novels.
- 'The Application of International Law to Forced Repatriation from Austria in 1945', in Stefan Karner, Erich Reiter, and Gerald Schöpfer (ed.), Kalter Krieg: Beiträge zur Ost-West-Konfrontation 1945 bis 1990 (Graz, 2002), ISBN 3-7011-7432-6.
- 'The Mysterious Fate of the Cossack Atamans’, in Harald Stadler, Rolf Steininger, and Karl C. Berger (ed.), Die Kosaken im Ersten und Zweiten Weltkrieg (Innsbruck, 2008), ISBN 978-3-7065-4623-2.
- ‘Geoffrey of Monmouth and the Merlin Legend’, in Arthurian Literature XXV (Cambridge, 2008), ISBN 978-1-84384-171-5.
- ‘When and where was Armes Prydein Composed?’, Studia Celtica (Cardiff, 2008), xlii, pp. 145–49.
- ‘Cadell and the Cadelling of Powys’, Studia Celtica (Cardiff, 2012), xlvi, pp. 59–83.
- The Oldest British Prose Literature: The Compilation of the Four Branches of the Mabinogi (New York, 2009), ISBN 978-0-7734-4710-3. This was awarded the Adèle Mellen Prize, and was runner-up for the Wales Book of the Year Prize in 2010.
- Victims of Yalta: The Secret Betrayal of the Allies, 1944–1947 (2nd ed.), Open Road Media (2013), ISBN 978-1-45324-936-9. Reprint of Victims of Yalta with new preface describing the Aldington trial and its aftermath.
- Patrick O'Brian: A Very Private Life, London 2019, ISBN 978-0-00835-058-1 The second volume of biography of his stepfather.
- Stalin's Vengeance: The Final Truth About the Forced Return of Russians After World War II (Academica Press, September 2021, ISBN 978-1680538809

Tolstoy has also contributed chapters to the new History of the Twentieth Century published in Moscow, which is a prescribed text for all Russian high schools.
