= NKVD filtration camps =

Soviet screening camp for returning soldiers

NKVD screening and filtration camps (Russian: проверочно-фильтрационные лагеря НКВД СССР), originally known as NKVD special-purpose camps / NKVD special camps (Russian: лагеря специального назначения НКВД СССР, спецлагеря НКВД), were camps for the screening of the Soviet soldiers returned from enemy occupied territories, enemy imprisonment, or enemy encirclement. During the massive program of repatriation of Soviet citizens after World War II, these camps were used for processing of officers among the prisoners of war, as well as civilian and military collaborators.

== During the war ==
The NKVD special-purpose camps were established by NKVD Order No. 001735 of December 28, 1941, titled "О создании специальных лагерей для бывших военнослужащих Красной Армии, находившихся в плену и в окружении противника" ("On the establishment of special camps for former soldiers of the Red Army who were in captivity, or were surrounded by the enemy"). By NKVD Order No. 00100 of February 20, 1945, they were renamed to "проверочно-фильтрационные лагеря" ("verification and filtration camps").

In addition, an 11 October 1943 joint directive of NKVD and NKGB no.494/94 "О порядке производства арестов в районах, освобожденных от захватчиков, ставленников и пособников оккупантов" ["On the procedure for making arrests in areas liberated from invaders, henchmen and accomplices of the occupiers"] instructed the NKVD special camps to keep the collaborators (officers of collaborationist forces, policemen who were reportedly tool part in punitive actions against civilians, starostas, burgomasters, hiwis, etc.), as well as persons of draft age from occupied territories. (The latter ones were to be drafted after security checks).

== Repatriation ==
The Allies of World War II agreed to mandatory repatriation of Soviet citizens at the Yalta Conference in February 1945. The bulk of handovers occurred from May to October 1945. Amounting to 4.2 million people, these included Ostarbeiters, collaborationists, prisoners of war, and refugees. The state cleared and sent home 58 percent of the population. Another 33.5 percent faced mobilization into the military or construction battalions.

There was concern among Soviet leaders that citizens that had been outside the supervision of the government and security services may need screening for security purposes and to ensure their political loyalty. Overall, about 1.5 million of surviving POWs, repatriated Ostarbeiter, and other displaced persons totaling more than 4,200,000 people went through filtration.

The vast majority of repatriates underwent verification and filtration outside of the Gulag system: in front-line and army camps, assembly-evacuation points of the People's Commissariat of Defense, and verification-filtration points of the NKVD. Rank-and-file prisoners of war were checked in reserve military units. Those needing further investigation, designated as the "NKVD special contingent" (spetskontingent), were transferred to NKVD special camps. Personnel of collaborationist units were sent to the NKVD camps or directly to Gulag corrective labor camps to undergo filtration. Officers among the prisoners of war were also sent to the NKVD special camps for further checking.

By 1946:

- 80% civilians and 20% of PoWs were freed
- 5% of civilians, and 43% of PoWs were re-drafted
- 10% of civilians and 22% of PoWs were sent to construction battalions
- 2% of civilians, and 15% of PoWs (226,127 out of 1,539,475 total) were transferred to the NKVD.

== See also ==
- NKVD special camps in Germany 1945–1950
- Filtration camp system in Chechnya
