= Swedish extradition of Baltic soldiers =

1945–1946 extradition of Latvian, Estonian and Lithuanian soldiers to USSR

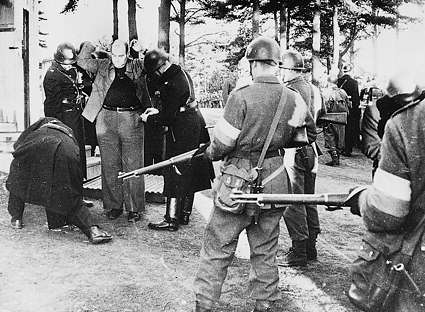
Baltic and German soldiers being extradited from a detention camp in Eksjö (Ekholm Part 1, Title and page 11). The Swedish officers in black are militarised police/gendarmerie, and the men in the foreground wearing tan are soldiers of the Swedish army.

The Swedish extradition of Baltic soldiers, or simply the Extradition of the Balts (Swedish: baltutlämningen), was a controversial political event that took place in January 1946, in the aftermath of World War II when Sweden, a neutral country during the war, extradited 146 Latvian, Estonian and Lithuanian soldiers, who had been drafted by Germany during the war and had been fighting against the Soviet invasion of the Baltic states, to the Soviet Union. Many of them were subsequently imprisoned, and five were sentenced to death by the Soviet government, with three executions carried out and two sentences commuted to hard labour.

== Background and extradition process ==
On 2 June 1945, the Soviet Union asked that Sweden extradite all interned Axis soldiers, as per the terms of the German surrender. The government protocol from 15 June was kept secret until it became public on 19 November. It was supported by most of the Swedish Parliament. The Swedish Communist Party wanted to go further, by extraditing all civilian refugees from Estonia, Latvia, and Lithuania. There was minimal sympathy for the Germans, but public outcry over the Baltic soldiers. On the evening of 24 November 1945, nearly the entire city of Eksjö left their homes in the largest demonstration in the city's history to protest against the extradition of the Baltic soldiers. The protests were ignored. Two regimental commanders who protested the repatriations were immediately fired.

The majority of the Baltic soldiers extradited were Latvians (130 out of 146) who had escaped from the Danzig pocket and Courland Pocket. When they reached Sweden, those in uniform were detained in detention camps. The extradition to the Soviet Union took place on 25 January 1946 in the port of Trelleborg for transportation on the steamer Beloostrov. On return they were briefly put in a camp in Liepāja and later released. According to one source at least 50 of the Latvians were arrested between 1947 and 1954 and were sentenced, often to 10–15 years in prison.

Sweden also extradited about 3,000 German soldiers, according to laws on prisoners of war. The people from the Baltic states were, however, more controversial since the Soviet authorities viewed them as Soviet citizens (the Soviet Union had occupied the independent Baltic states in 1940) and therefore regarded the people from the Baltic states as traitors, and the internees feared death sentences. Desperate to avoid extradition, some of the Baltic soldiers mutilated themselves or went on hunger strikes. Seven of them committed suicide. Nevertheless, the Swedish government, led by Per Albin Hansson, complied with Soviet demands to extradite the men.

Of the prisoners, Lieutenant Colonel Kārlis Gailītis and Captain Ernsts Ķeselis were sentenced to death but had their sentences changed to 17 years hard labour in Gulag camps. Three others of lower ranks were sentenced to death and executed in 1946.

== Subsequent events ==
In 1970, Johan Bergenstråhle made a film, A Baltic Tragedy, about the subject. The film is based on Per Olov Enquist's Legionärerna: En roman om baltutlämningen (1968; English title: The Legionnaires: A Documentary Novel) which had won the Nordic Council's Literature Prize and Enquist collaborated on the script.

On 20 June 1994, 40 of the 44 surviving extradited (35 Latvians, four Estonians, and one Lithuanian) accepted an invitation to visit Sweden. They were received by King Carl XVI Gustaf of Sweden at the Stockholm Palace. The Swedish Minister of Foreign Affairs Margaretha af Ugglas said that the Swedish government agreed with the criticism of the decision and regretted the injustice. On 15 August 2011, Swedish Prime Minister Fredrik Reinfeldt officially apologized to the prime ministers of Estonia, Latvia, and Lithuania at a ceremony in Stockholm saying that "Sweden owes its Baltic neighbours a 'debt of honour' for turning a blind eye to post-war Soviet occupation" and speaking of "a dark moment" in his country's history.

A memorial, "stranded refugee ship" (1999–2000) by Christer Bording, has been erected in Trelleborg.

== See also ==
- Latvian Legion
- Repatriation of Soviet citizens after World War II
- Repatriation of Cossacks after World War II
- Operation Keelhaul
- Sweden during World War II
- Western betrayal
