= Operation Keelhaul =

1946–1947 forced repatriation of Soviet military collaborators

- Part of the aftermath of World War II
- Operational scope: Repatriation of Soviet citizens after World War II
- Type: Intelligence operation
- Planned by: Allies of World War II
- Target: Military collaborators who had been Soviet nationals before 1 September 1939
- Date: 14 August 1946 – 9 May 1947
- Executed by: (United States) (United Kingdom) Allied Force Headquarters
- Outcome: 1,000 individuals identified and transferred to the Soviet Union

Operation Keelhaul was a 1946–1947 Allied operation to identify and repatriate Soviet military collaborators who were located in Allied-occupied Northern Italy. A part of the overall program of repatriation of Soviet citizens after World War II, this late stage, localized operation was carried out by British and American Allied Force Headquarters forces in Italy and Allied-occupied Austria.

Running from 14 August 1946 and 9 May 1947, Operation Keelhaul transferred about 1,000 military collaborators to the Soviet side. This was the last Allied forced repatriation of Soviet citizens in the aftermath of World War II.

== Historical context ==
The geopolitical framework for post-war repatriations was established at the February 1945 Yalta Conference, where the Big Three powers signed secret, reciprocal agreements governing prisoners of war and displaced persons. Under these protocols, any individuals identified as Soviet or Western nationals were subject to mandatory extraction to their respective homelands, regardless of personal consent. At the time of signing, the agreements enjoyed complete diplomatic consensus among the Allied delegations; the primary motivation for the United States and Great Britain was securing the rapid, safe recovery of tens of thousands of Western servicemen who had been liberated from German camps by the advancing Red Army. Fearing that any legal delays or diplomatic resistance would prompt the Soviet government to stall or halt this delicate ongoing exchange pipeline, Western leaders prioritized total compliance with Moscow's repatriation demands.

Following the unconditional surrender of Nazi Germany in May 1945, the implementation of these mandates created an acute crisis for Allied occupational forces in Austria and Italy. Supreme Headquarters Allied Expeditionary Force (SHAEF) and Allied Force Headquarters (AFHQ) were suddenly overwhelmed by millions of surrendered Axis troops, forced laborers, and refugees crowded into understaffed containment zones. Compounding this regional logistical strain was the presence of armed, uniform-wearing Soviet collaborationist units, such as the XV SS Cossack Cavalry Corps, that had retreated into Western zones to escape Soviet and Yugoslav forces. Bound by the Yalta mandates and facing local border frictions following Germany's surrender, Allied ground commands initially executed rapid, un-screened blanket camp clearings. The resulting mass panics and public suicides on the ground eventually forced a transition toward the highly bureaucratized screening mechanisms that culminated in Operation Keelhaul between 1946 and 1947.

== Background and planning ==
Operation Keelhaul, designed by the Allied Force Headquarters (AFHQ), the headquarters that controlled Allied operational forces in the Mediterranean theatre of World War II, targeted the Displaced Persons (DP) camps in Italy. These camps were to be swept last because Italy had become the ultimate geographical "dead end" for anti-Soviet military units escaping across Europe. By 1946, the mass repatriations out of France, Germany, and mainland Austria were largely complete. The camps in Italy became the final, lingering target due to specific military, geographical, and bureaucratic factors.

During the final months of the war, major collaborationist military formations, including the XV SS Cossack Cavalry Corps and elements of the Russian Liberation Army, were deployed by the Germans to fight partisans in the Balkans. As the Red Army advanced from the east, these units retreated westward and southward over the mountain passes into Northern Italy to surrender specifically to British and American forces. Among them were individual soldiers who had successfully evaded the initial 1945 mass roundups in Austria and Germany by escaping south into Italy, discarding their uniforms, and using false names to blend into Italian DP camps. Consequently, Italy became disproportionately packed with high-risk military collaborators who had managed to evade the immediate 1945 dragnet in other part of Allied-occupied Europe. Because the Italian theater had different operational priorities, the screening of its DP camps was delayed and heavily bureaucratized, dragging into late 1946.

Because the early mass sweeps in Germany (like the Plattling incident of February 1946) had caused public scandal and military protests, the Allies could no longer simply deport entire camps indiscriminately. When Operation Keelhaul officially launched in August 1946, it was designed as a highly meticulous, slow-moving legal filter specifically tailored to crack down on the thousands of collaborators hidden in Italy. In contrast to earlier efforts, non-combatant DPs were to be specifically excluded from repatriation.

== Identification tactics ==
Operation Keelhaul involved the identification and subsequent transfer of former Axis personnel from the camps of Bagnoli, Aversa, Pisa, and Riccione in Italy starting on 14 August, 1946. These collaborators were identified by the Allied screening boards via a highly structured interrogation process. Because these late-stage screenings required definitive proof of German service to justify a forced return, the boards relied on specialized counter-intelligence tactics to break through false identities. The most effective tool used was the inclusion of specialized language experts and British/American officers fluent in Russian. Those trying to evade deportation almost universally claimed to be from eastern Poland, the Baltic States, or parts of Ukraine that sat outside the 1939 Soviet borders. Interrogators would engage suspects in lengthy conversations to listen for regional accents and vocabulary. A person claiming to be a Polish farmer from Lublin who spoke Russian with a distinct Don Cossack dialect was immediately flagged for fraud.

Screening boards utilized detailed maps of Eastern Europe to test a suspect's claimed background. If a suspect said they were born and raised in a specific Polish village to escape the "Soviet citizen" designation, interrogators would demand meticulous details about the town, the names of local priests, or neighboring villages. Those who had merely picked a Polish town off a map failed these micro-geographic traps. Interrogators also performed physical examinations searching for scarring from removed military tattoos or combat wounds that did not align with a civilian refugee's story.

The chaotic retreat of Axis forces left a distinct chronological footprint that the boards used to trap liars. For example, interrogators demanded a strict, month-by-month accounting of where the refugee was located between 1941 and 1945. The boards then cross-referenced these personal timelines with known military movements. If a refugee's timeline perfectly tracked the retreat path of the XV SS Cossack Cavalry Corps from Yugoslavia into Northern Italy, the board assumed military collaboration, even in the absence of a uniform.

Finally, under the operational rules of Operation Keelhaul, Soviet repatriation officers were permitted inside camps to assist the Allied boards. The Soviets built networks of informants within the civilian DP populations to acquire information on hidden military personnel. They would frequently attend the screening boards directly, confronting suspects with pre-prepared lists of names, family details, or military unit registries from captured German archives.

In this fashion, the Allied boards identified approximately 1,000 military collaborators. The final phase of the operation, codenamed "East Wind", was their transfer to the Soviet authorities, which took place at St. Valentin in Allied-occupied Austria on 8 and 9 May 1947. This operation marked the end of forced repatriations to the Soviet Union after World War II. On the other side of the exchange, the Soviet leadership found out that despite the demands set forth by Stalin, British intelligence was retaining a number of anti-Communist prisoners under orders from Churchill, with the intention of reviving "anti-Soviet operations".

== Aftermath and assessment ==
Unlike the 1945 repatriations, Operation Keelhaul did not produce the numerous or high-profile cases of non-citizens being handed over to the Soviet side, due to the implementation of rigorous and much stricter identity criteria. The historian Christopher Booker estimates that the number of non-Soviet citizens swept into this specific operation was exceptionally low—likely limited to a handful of unquantifiable individual cases who failed the geographic or linguistic tests.

The legal classification of Operation Keelhaul remains a highly sensitive and debated topic within post-war historiography. Critics like Julius Epstein argue that the forced repatriation protocol qualified as a war crime under Articles 2 and 3 of the Geneva Convention on Prisoners of War, particularly emphasizing the illegality of executing blanket handovers of individuals who had never been Soviet nationals. However, historical consensus among mainstream scholars notes that the Allied Force Headquarters operated under strict macro-level directives from the Yalta Conference to return individuals identified as Soviet nationals regardless of personal consent. While strict screening measures during Operation Keelhaul kept the number of improperly transferred individuals very low (no cases are explicitly known), the forced nature of the transfers remains a point of contention. Ultimately, many historians view the operation as the fulfillment of the Yalta protocols rather than a direct violation of international law, despite the coercive methods used.

== See also ==
- Bleiburg repatriations
- Repatriation of Soviet citizens after World War II
- Repatriation of Cossacks after World War II
- Soviet repressions against former prisoners of war
- Swedish extradition of Baltic soldiers
