= Julius Epstein (writer) =

American historian

Julius Viktor Stefan "Tully" Epstein (26 December 1901 – 3 July 1975) was an Austrian–American journalist and scholar. A Jewish émigré who fled Europe in 1938, he worked in the United States Office of War Information during World War II, later becoming a prominent anti-communist researcher and critic of the Soviet Union. Epstein was a research associate at the Hoover Institution on War, Revolution and Peace for decades and authored a study of mandatory repatriation of Soviet citizens after World War II. Entitling his work Operation Keelhaul (after the actual Operation Keelhaul), he popularized the code name as an umbrella term for the overall repatriation program. Declassified files later established the operation's narrower 1946–1947 timeframe and focus strictly on military collaborators.

== Life ==
Epstein was the son of Alice Epstein-Strauss (later von Meyszner); the grandson of Adele Strauss; and the adoptive grandson of "Waltzking" Johann Strauss II. A native of Vienna, Epstein was educated at the Universities of Jena and Leipzig in Germany. He left Germany on March 17, 1933, and lived for a time in Prague, Czechoslovakia. When that country was threatened by Hitler in 1938, he fled with his wife and son to Zurich. In March 1939 the Epstein family arrived in New York City.

Epstein was accredited to the United Nations as foreign correspondent for a number of Swiss newspapers and also contributed articles on the growing crisis in Europe to US magazines. In 1942, he joined the staff of the Office of War Information as language editor. After the war, he was named as New York correspondent for a group of newspapers in West Germany; he contributed articles to German magazines and US periodicals like Plain Talk, Human Events, and National Review.

In 1963, he received an appointment to the Hoover Institution as an assistant to Dr. Stefan Thomas Possony, who conceived the Strategic Defense Initiative. Three years later, he was named professor of international affairs by Lincoln University in San Francisco.

Epstein died in Palo Alto, California. He was survived by his widow, Vally, and a son, Peter Stevens.

== Select works ==
=== Lost cosmonauts ===
In 1962, during the height of the Cold War, Epstein alleged that the Soviet Union had lost at least a dozen cosmonauts in undisclosed space disasters. Epstein claimed it was known to the US government, but the State Department did not want "to embarrass the Russians" by revealing it. He wrote, "Washington's silence appears to be motivated by the strong desire to hear no evil, see no evil and speak no evil about the U.S.S.R." Epstein called on the US government to disclose the extent of its knowledge of Soviet space losses: "Now is the time for the government to make the deaths public for the sake of accurate history." These claims are widely believed to be false.

=== Operation Keelhaul ===
Epstein's 1973 book, Operation Keelhaul, is a study of mandatory repatriation of Soviet citizens by the Western Allies. Entitling his work Operation Keelhaul (after the actual Operation Keelhaul), he popularized the code name as an umbrella Cold-war era term for the overall repatriation program. The book alleges that Western Allies violated international law by forcibly returning millions of prisoners of war and anti-communist refugees to Soviet execution squads and the Gulag. Writing in the early 1970s, Epstein lacked access to official British and American military files, which were still classified. He relied instead on personal journalistic investigations, public Freedom of Information Act (FOIA) requests, and testimonies from survivors. While contemporary accounts acknowledged Epstein's role in exposing real military abuses and cover-ups, later analysis deemed his narrative ideologically exaggerated, with post-1990s archival research revealing that most repatriations were voluntary or occurred prior to the forced roundups, and that the majority of returnees were not prosecuted nor sent to the Gulag.

In subsequent decades, academic historians reviewing Epstein's pioneering work highlighted several technical and methodological limitations. Because he wrote the book before the partial declassifications of the late 1970s and the opening of Soviet archives in the 1990s, critics noted that Epstein incorrectly assumed the term "Operation Keelhaul" applied to the entire multi-year repatriation process rather than one specific, late-stage military action in 1946–1947 targeting military collaborators. Furthermore, contemporary assessments point out his lack of engagement with Russian-language sources and a tendency to view complex, pressured bureaucratic decisions strictly through a lens of moral outrage. Despite these flaws, his book remains recognized as a foundational text that successfully broke decades of government silence and forced the Western academic community to confront the dark ethical realities of post-war Allied policy.

Epstein worked for 20 years to acquire the files necessary to write his treatment on the subject. He had to sue the government to force them to declassify and release the files.

== Bibliography ==
Books

- The Case Against Vera Micheles Dean and the Foreign Policy Association, 1947.
- The Mysteries of the Van Vliet Report: A Case History, Chicago: Polish American Congress, Inc., 1951.
- Operation Keelhaul: The Story of Forced Repatriation from 1944 to the Present, Old Greenwich, Connecticut: Devin-Adair, 1973.

Articles;

- "The Bang-Jensen Tragedy: A Review Based on the Official Records," American Opinion (May 1960)
