= Construction battalion (Soviet Union) =

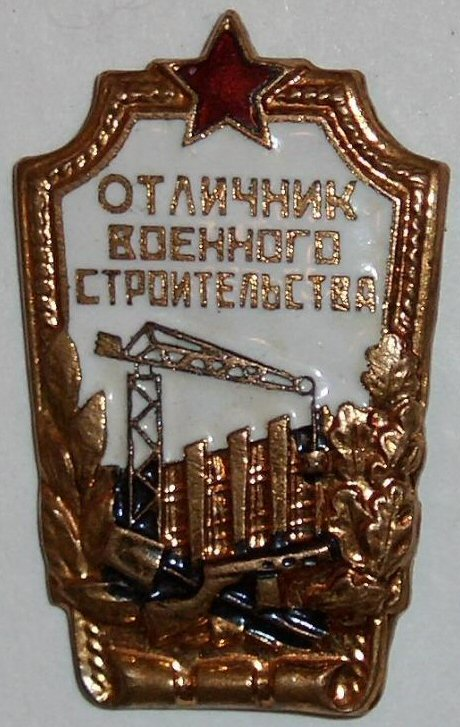
The 1954 badge, "Excellence in military construction"

Military construction battalion or military construction detachment was an independent battalion-level military unit within the Construction Troops (Soviet Union) of the Red Army, Soviet Army, NKVD, and MVD. The formation combined features of a military unit and a construction organization. In the post-war Soviet Union, these detachments transitioned into self-financing (khozraschyot) entities funded primarily by their own earnings. Soviet military commissariats staffed the units through conscription. Conscripts received a distinct status as a service member in the construction troops, subject both to military and labor laws. They took the military oath and completed their active service obligations within these units. Concurrently, they worked as construction laborers, received wages, and accrued civilian labor seniority for their time served. Military construction detachments and independent military construction companies existed outside the standard personnel strength of the Soviet Armed Forces. However, career servicemen filled their command positions, including the detachment commander, chief of staff, and company commanders.

== After World War II ==
Following the liberation of Soviet territories from German occupation, the NKVD (and later the MVD) began drafting specific groups of population into military construction battalions. The mobilized categories included:

- Men of draft age who missed the wartime Red Army conscription due to occupation, and whose age exceeded standard post-war draft limits;
- Former Soviet prisoners of war. They had to complete their service terms, as time in captivity did not count toward fulfillment of conscription obligations;
- Ostarbeiters deported to Germany and now repatriated to the Soviet Union;
- Collaborationist police and gendarmerie personnel who did not commit war crimes.

Troops ranged from 18 to 40 years old. Authorities organized platoons by trade, including carpenters, bricklayers, and plasterers.
