= 11th Luftwaffe Field Division =

- Active: 1942–1945
- Country: Nazi Germany
- Branch: Luftwaffe
- Type: Infantry
- Size: Division
- Engagements: World War II; Mediterranean and Middle East theatre of World War II; Dodecanese campaign; Battle of Leros; Operation Kondor; Eastern Front (World War II); Operation Spring Awakening

The 11th Luftwaffe Field Division (German: 11.Luftwaffen-Feld-Division) was an infantry division of the Luftwaffe branch of the Wehrmacht that fought in World War II. It was formed at Troop Training Camp Munsterlager, in Luftgau IV (Dresden region), in October 1942. The cadre used to create this unit was Flieger-Regiment 31, which had been stationed in Hilversum since 1941. The Division was organized around two Jager Regiments: Luftwaffen-Jager-Regiment 21 and Luftwaffen-Jager-Regiment 22 with three battalions each. The Division did not initially contain a Panzer-Jager battalion but did contain an Infanteriegeschutz-Kompanie (or specialized infantry heavy weapons company) and a Panzer-Jager Kompanie in each regiment. The Flak Battalion comprised four batteries. Batteries I and II comprised six Flak 38 Guns each 2 cm Flak 30, Flak 38 and Flakvierling 38 and III Battery comprised three quadruple barreled Flakvierling 38 Guns. Number IV Battery comprised four Flak 36 8.8 cm Flak 18/36/37/41 Guns. The Artillery Regiment initially also contained two Artillerie-Abteilung of four batteries of towed (by the Opel Blitz) vehicles 7.5 cm FK 38, with four guns in each. There was also a Pioneer-Battalion, a Bicycle or Radfabr-Kompanie (which acted as the division's reconnaissance), a signals company and a supply company. (Note: On the 30 August 1943 an additional artillery battalion was added. I Artllerie-Abteilung now had three batteries of four towed 7.5 cm FK 38 guns. II Artllerie-Abteilung now had three batteries of four towed Canon de 75 modèle 1897 howitzers modified for modern battlefield conditions, i.e. their wooden wheels were replaced with all metal ones, like German anti-tank guns. The Third, III Artllerie-Abteilung had two batteries of four towed Canon de 75 modèle 1897 howitzers.) (Note: By the spring of 1943 divisional Panzer-Jager Abteilung (battalion) had been established as two companies of nine 5 cm Pak 38 anti-tank guns and five 7.5 cm Pak 40 anti tank guns. There was also a battery of four 75mm L48 long barreled Sturmgeschütz III assault guns. However, one source says that only the battalion headquarters and 1 Panzer-Jager Kompanie were created.) In January 1943 it was sent to Greece to combat increased partisan activity and served in Army Group E.

== Operational history ==
From 1 January 1943 till August 1944 it was stationed in the occupied Greece, under LXVIII Army Corps (Wehrmacht) as part of Army Group E. From February 1943 until April 1943 the Division was stationed in Crete and other surrounding islands but moved back to the mainland by April 1943 and was moved to occupied Greek Macedonia on September of that year. In November 1943 the Division was absorbed into the Heer as Felddivision 11 (L). The Flak Battalion was also removed by Hermann Goring at this time and returned to the Luftwaffe. On 9 August 1944 this division was implicated in the largest roundup in Athens, the Raid of Kokkinia, with hundreds of civilians participating in the resistance executed, thousands of hostages sent to concentration camps, burning down of entire house blocks, and significant atrocities.

In the later half on 1943 elements of the Division operated with the Brandenburgers commandos during the Dodecanese campaign and the Battle of Leros, which resulted in a British defeat. It took part in August 1944 in Operation Kondor, in which atrocities were committed against civilians. In September 1944 it began its move Northwards along with other German forces to withdraw from the Balkans. In February 1945 the division was assigned to the XV SS Cossack Cavalry Corps, in addition to the corps' existing 1st and 2nd Cossack Cavalry Divisions and took part in Operation Spring Awakening along with Army Group F. On 8 May 1945 The Division surrendered to British forces at Klagenfurt. On balance Munoz states, "The Division operated with greater success than most other Luftwaffe Field Divisions." It is considered one of the Three best Luftwaffe Field Divisions, albeit it spent the greater part of its existence fighting partisans in Greece and not on the Eastern Front.

== Commanders ==
- Generalleutnant Karl Drum (October 1942 - 9 November 1943)
- Oberst Alexander Bourquin, (10 November 1943 – 1 December 1943)
- Generalleutnant Wilhelm Köhler, (1 January 1944 – October 1944)
- Generalmajor Gerhard Henke, (1 November 1944 – 8 May 1945)

== Notes ==
Footnotes

Citations

== Sources ==
- Lexikon der Wehrmacht Luftwaffen-Felddivision 11
