= Waffen-SS foreign volunteers and conscripts =

Recruits for the Waffen-SS in World War II

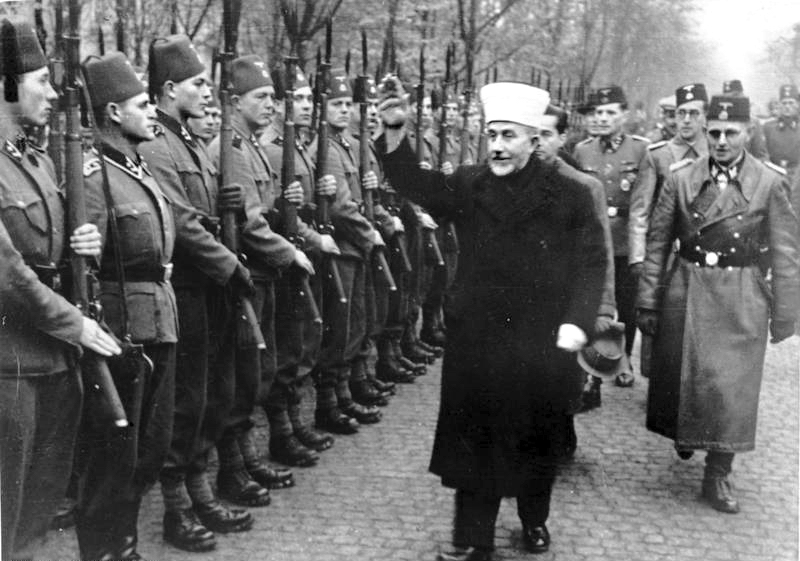
Bosnian Muslims volunteers of the 13th Waffen Mountain Division of the SS "Handschar" (1st Croatian) being inspected by Haj Amin al-Husseini, alongside SS-Brigadeführer Karl-Gustav Sauberzweig, November 1943

During World War II, the Waffen-SS recruited or conscripted significant numbers of non-Germans. Of a peak strength of 950,000 in 1944, the Waffen-SS consisted of some 400,000 "Reich Germans" and 310,000 ethnic Germans from outside Germany's pre-1939 borders (mostly from German-occupied Europe), the remaining 240,000 being non-Germans. Thus, at their numerical peak, non-Germans comprised 25% of all Waffen-SS troops. (Note: These figures vary slightly. For instance, historian George H. Stein recorded that only 500,000 non-Germans and ethnic Germans from outside Germany, mostly from German-occupied Europe, were recruited between 1940 and 1945.) The units were under the control of the SS Führungshauptamt (SS Command Main Office) led by Reichsführer-SS Heinrich Himmler. Upon mobilisation, the units' tactical control was given to the Oberkommando der Wehrmacht (High Command of the Armed Forces).

== History of the Waffen-SS ==
The Waffen-SS (Armed SS) was created as the militarised wing of the Schutzstaffel (SS; "Protective Squadron") of the Nazi Party. Its origins can be traced back to the selection of a group of 120 SS men in 1933 by Sepp Dietrich to form the Sonderkommando Berlin, which became the Leibstandarte SS Adolf Hitler (LSSAH). In 1934, the SS developed its own military branch, the SS-Verfügungstruppe (SS-VT), which together with the LSSAH, evolved into the Waffen-SS. Nominally under the authority of Heinrich Himmler, the Waffen-SS developed a fully militarised structure of command and operations. It grew from three regiments to over 38 divisions during World War II, serving alongside the Heer (army), while never formally being a part of it. Adolf Hitler did not want the Waffen-SS integrated into either the army or the state police. Instead it was to remain an independent force of military-trained men at the disposal of the Führer.

== Recruitment and conscription ==
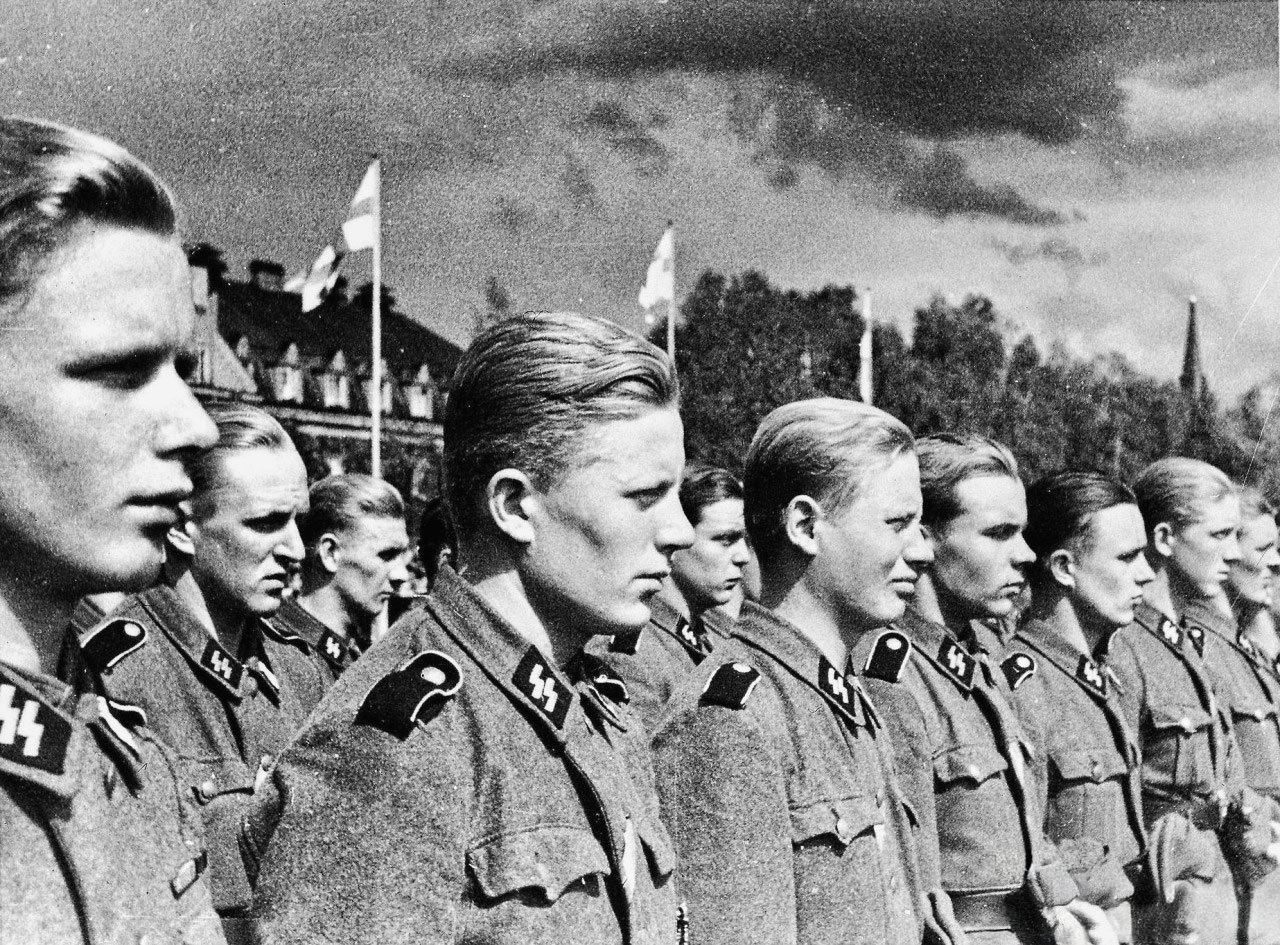
Finnish SS volunteers, 1943

In 1934, Himmler initially set stringent requirements for recruits. They were to be German nationals who could prove their Aryan ancestry back to 1750 for officer positions (1800 for party leadership), unmarried, and without a criminal record. Recruits had to be between the ages of 17 and 23, at least 1.74 metres (5 ft 9 in) tall (1.78 metres (5 ft 10 in) for the Leibstandarte). Recruits were required to have perfect teeth and eyesight and provide a medical certificate. By 1938, the height restrictions were relaxed, up to six dental fillings were permitted, and eyeglasses for astigmatism and mild vision correction were allowed. Once World War II began in Europe, the physical requirements were no longer strictly enforced. Following the Battle of France in 1940, Hitler authorised the enlistment of "people perceived to be of related stock", as Himmler put it, to expand the ranks. A number of Danes, Dutch, Norwegians, Swedes, and Finns volunteered to serve in the Waffen-SS under the command of German officers. Non-Germanic units were not considered to be part of the SS directly, which still maintained its strict racial criteria; instead they were considered to be foreign nationals serving under the command of the SS.

Not all members of the SS-Germanischen Leitstelle (SS-GL) or the RHSA stressed the nationalistic tenets of the Nazi state with respect to the war and occupation but instead looked to pan-Germanic ideas that included disempowering the political elites, while at the same time, integrating Germanic elements from other nations into the Reich on the basis of racial equality. One of the leaders of the SS-GL, Dr. Franz Riedweg (an SS-Colonel), unambiguously emphasized:

"We must be clear about the fact that Germanic politics can only be resolved under the SS, not by the state, not by the bulk of the party!...We cannot build Europe as a police state under the protection of bayonets, but must shape the life of Europe according to greater Germanic viewpoints." (Note: The original German reads: "Wir müssen uns darüber im klaren sein, daß die germanische Politik nur unter der SS gelöst werden kann, nicht vom Staat, nicht vom Gros der Partei!...Wir können Europa nicht als Polizeistaat aufbauen unter dem Schutz von Bajonetten, sondern müssen das Leben Europas nach großgermanischen Gesichtspunkten gestalten")

Recruitment began in April 1940 with the creation of two regiments: Nordland (later SS Division Nordland) and Westland (later SS Division Wiking). As they grew in numbers, the volunteers were grouped into Legions (with the size of battalion or brigade); their members included the so-called Germanic non-Germans as well as ethnic German officers originating from the occupied territories. Against the Führer's wishes—who forbade using military units of so-called "racially inferior" persons—the SS added foreign recruits and used them to flexibly overcome manpower shortages. Some of these foreign Waffen-SS units were employed for security purposes, among other things.

After Germany invaded the Soviet Union during Operation Barbarossa, recruits from France, Spain, Belgium, the territory of occupied Czechoslovakia, Hungary, and the Balkans were signed on. By February 1942, Waffen-SS recruitment in south-east Europe turned into compulsory conscription for all German minorities of military age. From 1942 onwards, further units of non-Germanic recruits were formed. Legions were formed of men from Estonia, Latvia as well as men from Bosnia, Herzegovina, Croatia, Georgia, Ukraine, Russia, and Cossacks. By 1943 the Waffen-SS could no longer claim to be an "elite" fighting force overall. Recruitment and conscription based on "numerical over qualitative expansion" took place, with many of the "foreign" units being good for only rear-guard duty.

A system of nomenclature developed to formally distinguish personnel based on their place of origin. Germanic units would have the "SS" prefix, while non-Germanic units were designated with the "Waffen" prefix to their names. The formations with volunteers of Germanic background were officially named Freiwilligen (volunteer) (Scandinavians, Dutch, and Flemish), including ethnic Germans born outside the Reich known as Volksdeutsche, and their members were from satellite countries. These were organised into independent legions and had the designation Waffen attached to their names for formal identification. In addition, the German SS Division Wiking included recruits from Denmark, Norway, Finland, Sweden, and Estonia throughout its history. Despite manpower shortages, the Waffen-SS was still based on the racist ideology of Nazism. Early in 1943, the Waffen-SS accepted 12,643 of the 53,000 recruits it garnered in western Ukraine and by 1944 the number reached as high as 22,000. Recruitment efforts in 1943 in Estonia yielded about 5,000 soldiers for the 20th Estonian SS Division. In Latvia, however, the Nazis were more successful, as, by 1944, there were upwards of 100,000 soldiers serving in the Latvian Waffen-SS divisions.

Before the war's end, the foreigners who served in the Waffen-SS numbered "some 500,000", including those who were pressured into service or conscripted. Historian Martin Gutmann adds that some of the additional forces came from "Eastern and Southeastern Europe, including Muslim soldiers from the Balkans."

Scholars note that the foreign SS formations were created through a mix of volunteering, coercion and conscription; their combat effectiveness varied widely, and several units and SS police formations were implicated in war crimes in Eastern Europe and the Balkans.

== Post-war ==
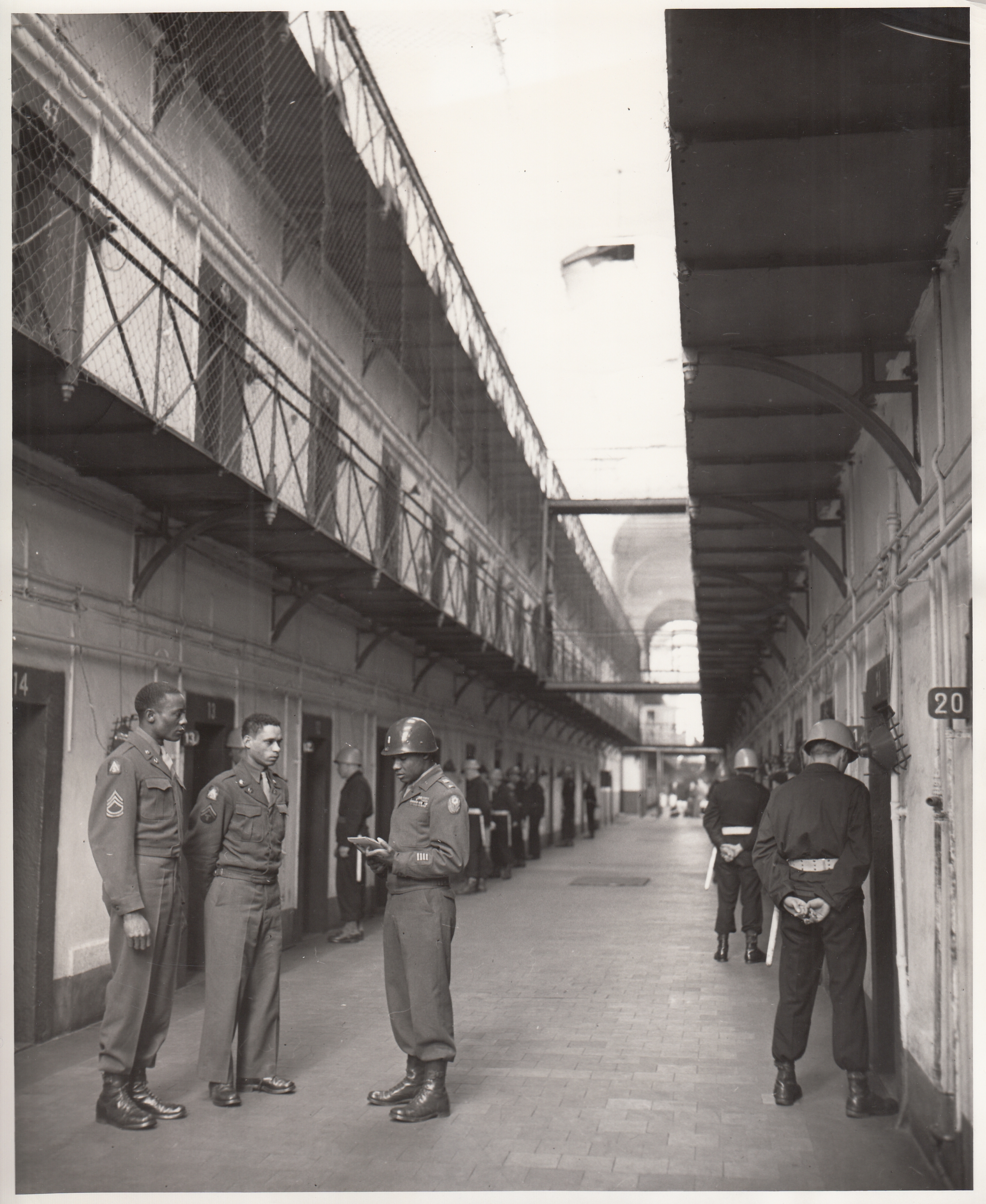
Former Baltic Waffen-SS conscripts, wearing black uniforms with blue helmets and white belts, guarding Hermann Goering, Rudolf Hess, and other top Nazis during the Nuremberg Trials

During the Nuremberg trials, the SS (including the Waffen-SS) was declared a criminal organisation. Conscripts who were not given a choice as to joining the ranks and had not committed "such crimes" were determined to be exempt from this declaration. (Note: A number of volunteers were executed, while others were tried and imprisoned by their countries. Still others either lived in exile or returned to their homeland.)

Belgian collaborator Léon Degrelle escaped to Spain, despite being sentenced to death in absentia by the Belgian authorities. About 150 Baltic soldiers from Latvia, Lithuania, and Estonia who fought against the Soviets and escaped to Sweden were extradited to the Soviet Union in 1946.

The men of the XV SS Cossack Corps found themselves in Austria at the end of the war and surrendered to the British Army. Though they were given assurances that they would not be repatriated, the Cossack prisoners of war were nonetheless forcibly returned to the Soviet Union. Most along with their families were subsequently executed by the Soviet authorities for treason.

After the war, members of Baltic Waffen-SS units were considered separate and distinct in purpose, ideology and activities from the German SS by the Western Allies. (Note: Also see: Richard Rashke, Useful Enemies: America's Open-Door Policy for Nazi War Criminals, Open Road Media (2013)) During the 1946 Nuremberg trials, Estonians, Latvians, and Lithuanians who were drafted into the Waffen-SS were determined not to be criminals for having been "wedged between, and subject to, the dictates of two authoritarian regimes."

Around 10,000 Ukrainian members of the 14th Waffen Grenadier Division of the SS (1st Galician) were held by the British in prisoner-of-war camps at Rimini. Some were later transferred to the United Kingdom in 1947 and released in 1949. A number were handed over to Soviet authorities, where they were executed or sent to labour camps in Siberia. About 1,200 were interned by U.S. forces in Germany and released within a year.

== Foreign Waffen-SS formations and foreign units under SS control ==
=== Foreign Waffen-SS formations ===
Designation	Formation	Personnel	Peak size	Notes
1st SS Cossack Cavalry Division	November 1943	Don, Kuban, Terek and Siberian Cossacks	n/a	United with 2nd Cossack Cavalry Division into the XV SS Cossack Cavalry Corps in 1945
2nd Cossack Cavalry Division	December 1944	Don, Kuban and Terek Cossacks	n/a	United with 1st SS Cossack Cavalry Division into the XV SS Cossack Cavalry Corps
SS Regiment ‘Westland’	June 1940	Dutch volunteers and Belgian Flemings.	n/a	Absorbed in 5th SS Panzer Division Wiking in December 1940
SS Regiment ‘Nordwest’	April 1941	Dutch (1,400), Belgian Flemings (805) and Danes (108) volunteers	2,500	Disbanded in September 1941.
5th SS Panzer Division 'Wiking'	September 1940	Dutch, Norwegian, Danish, Flemish, German, Swedish. (Note: Incorporated from Regiment SS-Westland and SS-Nordland into the 5th SS Panzer Division Wiking)	19,377	Formed by merging SS Regiment ‘Westland’ and 'Nordland'. Mostly Reich Germans and Volksdeutsche.
VI SS Army Corps (Latvian)	October 1943	Latvian	31,500 (Note: Number of Latvians serving in the Latvian Waffen SS in July 1944)	Formed in October 1943 with the Latvian brigade and Waffen-SS divisions (1st Latvian and 2nd Latvian).
7th SS Volunteer Mountain Division Prinz Eugen	March 1942	Volksdeutsche (Ethnic Germans) from the Serbian Banat mostly but also Croatia, Hungary and Romania with some Reich German cadres	20,624	Germanic formation Volksdeutsche (92%) and Reich German In January 1945 absorbed the remnants of the 21st Waffen Mountain Division of the SS Skanderbeg (1st Albanian) as a battalion.
IX Waffen Mountain Corps of the SS (Croatian)	July 1944	Albanian, Croatian, Bosnian Muslims.	n/a	Formed from 'Kama' (2,000 men) and 'Handschar' (10,000 men) as well as some German and Hungarian units.
11th SS Volunteer Panzergrenadier Division Nordland	March 1943	Volksdeutsche from Romania and Reich Germans, plus Danes, Norwegians, Dutch, Swedes, and Flemish.	—	Formed from Wiking's "Nordland" Regiment; mostly Balkan Volksdeutsche personnel. Included Norwegians in SS-Volunteer Panzergrenadier Regiment 23 "Norge".
13th Waffen Mountain Division of the SS Handschar (1st Croatian)	March 1943	Bosnian Muslims with some Catholic Croats, Albanian Muslims and German cadres.	26,000	First non-Germanic Waffen-SS division
SS-Waffen-Gebirgsjäger Battalion 13	March 1943	Albanian Muslims from Kosovo and Sanjak.	1,340	Part of SS Waffen Gebirgsjäger Regiment 2 under 13th Division of the SS Handschar
14th Waffen Grenadier Division of the SS (1st Galician/Ukrainian)	July 1943	Ukrainian volunteers	n/a	In November 1944, renamed 1st Ukrainian Division of the Ukrainian National Army" (1st UD UNA). (Note: According to Andrii Bolianovskyi, the change of the division's official names illustrates the change of attitude of the Third Reich towards Ukrainian national aspirations.)
15th Waffen Grenadier Division of the SS (1st Latvian)	May 1943	Latvian conscripts	n/a	n/a
XV SS Cossack Cavalry Corps	December 1944	Don, Kuban, Terek and Siberian Cossacks	n/a	Formed from the 1st and 2nd Cossack Cavalry Division, and the Cossack Plastun Brigade.
19th Waffen Grenadier Division of the SS (2nd Latvian)	February 1944	Latvian	n/a	
Latvian SS Volunteer Legion	February 1943	Latvian	n/a	Merged to form the 15th Waffen Grenadier Division of the SS (1st Latvian).
20th Waffen Grenadier Division of the SS (1st Estonian)	January 1944	Estonians	n/a	Formed from the 3rd Estonian SS Volunteer Brigade, Wiking's Estonian "Narwa" Battalion
3rd Estonian SS Volunteer Brigade	October 1943	Estonians	5,099	Formed from the Estonian Legion, became the 20th Waffen Grenadier Division of the SS (1st Estonian) in 1944.
Estonian SS Legion	August 1942	Estonians	n/a	Waffen-SS-organized, brigade size expanded into the 3rd Estonian SS Volunteer Brigade, followed by the 20th Division of the SS (1st Estonian) in 1944.
21st Waffen Mountain Division of the SS Skanderbeg (1st Albanian)	May 1944	Albanian Muslims (mostly Kosovo Gheg Albanians) with German, Austrian and Volksdeutsche cadres	9,000	Formed from volunteers supplied by the League of Prizren and the Albanian collaborationist government, as well as Croatian Ustaša militias and SS "Handschar" division Albanian personnel. Disbanded in November 1944 with some members joining ‘Prinz Eugen’.
22nd SS Volunteer Cavalry Division Maria Theresia	n/a	Volksdeutsche from Hungary and Hungarians.	n/a	
23rd SS Volunteer Panzer Grenadier Division 'Nederland'	February 1945	Dutch	n/a	Formed from the 4th Volunteer Panzer Grenadier Brigade Nederland and SS Legion Nederland. Received number 23 after SS Kama was disbanded
4th SS Panzer Grenadier Brigade Nederland	October 1943	Dutch (40%), Reich Germans and Volksdeutsche.	5,426	Formed from Volunteer Legion Nederland upgraded to 23rd SS Volunteer Division Nederland on 10 February 1945.
23rd Waffen Mountain Division of the SS Kama (2nd Croatian)	June 1944	Bosnian Muslims, Croats and Volksdeutsche	n/a	n/a
24th Waffen Mountain Division of the SS Karstjäger	August 1944	Volksdeutsche from Yugoslavia and the South Tyrol	n/a	Downgraded to brigade in January 1945.
25th Waffen Grenadier Division of the SS Hunyadi (1st Hungarian)	November 1944	Hungarian volunteers and conscripts.	n/a	n/a
26th Waffen Grenadier Division of the SS 'Hungaria' (2nd Hungarian)	November 1944	Hungarian volunteers	n/a	n/a
27th SS Volunteer Grenadier Division Langemarck (1st Flemish)	May 1943	Belgian Flemish with a few Finnish volunteers	2,022	Formed from the Flemish Legion as 6th SS Volunteer Assault Brigade Langemarck, upgraded to division in December 1944.
28th SS Volunteer Grenadier Division 'Wallonia'	September 1944	n/a	n/a	Formed when 5th SS Assault Brigade Wallonia was raised to a division.
SS Volunteer Assault Brigade 'Wallonia'	n/a	Belgian Walloons	1,850	Formed when the Walloon Legion was admitted into the Waffen SS
29th Waffen Grenadier Division of the SS RONA (1st Russian)	June 1944	Russian	n/a	Formed from the Kaminski Brigade (RONA), became division in August 44, received number in August.
29th Waffen Grenadier Division of the SS (1st Italian)	September 1944	Italian	n/a	Established as Italian SS Volunteer Legion, then Waffen-Grenadier-Brigade der SS (ital. Nr. 1). Received number 29 after SS RONA was disbanded
30th Waffen Grenadier Division of the SS (Russian No. 2)	Aug 1944	Byelorussian, Russian, Ukrainian, Polish, Tatar with German officers.	n/a	Disbanded in December 1944
30th Waffen Grenadier Division of the SS (1st Belarusian)	Aug 1944	Belarusian, Polish, Russian, and Ukrainian	10,000	Formed from Schutzmannschaft-Brigade Siegling personnel
31st SS Volunteer Grenadier Division	January 1945	Volksdeutsche from the Hungarian Bačka and Baranja region and members of the Arrow Cross.	14,800	Formed partially from remnants of the disbanded 23rd Mountain Division 'Kama'. Allegedly named 'Bohemia-Moravia'
33rd Waffen Grenadier Division of the SS Charlemagne	Feb 1945	French	7,340	Formed from LVF, Brigade Frankreich and other French collaborators.
33rd Waffen Cavalry Division of the SS (3rd Hungarian)	December 1944	Hungarian volunteers	n/a	Absorbed in January 1945 by the 26th SS Panzer Grenadier Division (Ungarische # 2)
34th SS Volunteer Grenadier Division 'Landstorm Nederland'	November 1944	Dutch	n/a	Formed as Landstorm Nederland then in November 1944 integrated as SS Brigade 'Landstorm Nederland', upgraded to division in February 1945.
Indian Volunteer Legion of the Waffen-SS	August 1944	n/a	n/a	Formed from the Indian Grenadier Regiment 950.
35th SS-Police Grenadier Division	February 1945	n/a	n/a	Formed from police personnel, near the end of the war.
36th Waffen Grenadier Division of the SS	February 1945	Russian and Ukrainian volunteers	4,000	Formerly 2.SS-Sturmbrigade Dirlewanger.
37th SS Volunteer Cavalry Division Lützow	February 1945	Hungarians, and Volksdeutsche from Hungary.	n/a	Attached to the 6th SS Panzer Army
SS Ski Jäger Battalion "Norwegen"	September 1942	Norwegian	n/a	Part of the 6th SS Mountain Division Nord
Norwegian Legion	June 1941	Norwegian	1,218	de facto incorporated into the Waffen- SS
SS Volunteer Sturmbrigade France	July 1943	French	1,688	In September 1944 the Sturmbrigade brigade was amalgamated with the Legion of French Volunteers (L.V.F), which became the core of the SS Division Charlemagne.
Waffen Grenadier Regiment of the SS (1st Bulgarian)	n/a	n/a	n/a	n/a
SS-Freiwilligen Legion Flandern	September 1941	Flemish	875	Formed from the Flemish Legion disbanded in May 1943 and reformed within the SS Assault Brigade Langemarck
Finnish Volunteer Battalion of the Waffen-SS	March 1941	Finnish	1,408	disbanded in mid-1943
Finnish SS-Company 'Kalevala'	1944	Formed of Finnish defectors, POWs and interned sailors.	250	Disbanded in May 1945
1st Hungarian SS-Ski Battalion	n/a	n/a	n/a	Formed of two battalions
SS-Brigade Ney	October 1944	Hungarian volunteers	3,100	
SS Waffen Mountain Brigade (Tatar No. 1)	July 1944	Crimean Tatars volunteers, German Hungarians	2,421	Formed from the SS Waffen Mountain Regiment (Tatar No. 1). Disbanded on 1 Jan 1945, reformed as 2-Brigade "Crimea" Armed Group, and assigned to the East Turkic Armed SS Unit (Osttürkische Waffenverband).
SS Waffen Mountain Regiment (Tatar No. 1)	March 1944	Crimean Tatars volunteers.	n/a	Formed from the remnants of the Crimean Tatar Auxiliary Police, Upgraded to SS Waffen Mountain Brigade (Tatar No. 1) in July 1944.
East Turkish Armed League of the SS	January 1944	Turkmen, Azeri, Kyrgyz, Uzbeks and Tajiks volunteers	n/a	Muslim SS division based in northern Italy, recruited in the Caucasus.
Waffen Grenadier Regiment of the SS (1st Romanian)	n/a	n/a	n/a	n/a
Waffen Grenadier Regiment of the SS (2nd Romanian)	n/a	n/a	n/a	n/a
Spanische-Freiwilligen-Kompanie der SS 101	September 1944	Spaniards	n/a	Formed from former Blue Legion personnel, merged into the 28th SS Volunteer Grenadier Division Wallonien and later into the 11th SS Grenadier Division ‘Nordland’.
Spanische-Freiwilligen-Kompanie der SS 102	January 1944	Spaniards	n/a	

=== Foreign units under SS command ===
This list includes both units formally incorporated into the Waffen SS or non-Waffen SS units put under Waffen SS command.

Designation	Formation	Personnel	Peak size	Notes
Freikorps Danmark	July 1941	Danish volunteers	1,164	Battalion sized, disbanded in May 1943, personnel transferred to the Nordland Division.
Schalburg Corps	April 1943	Danes	n/a	Formed with former Freikorps soldiers, disbanded in February 1945.
Guard Corps of the German Luftwaffe in Denmark [da]	February 1944	Danes	1,200	Known as ‘Sommer's Guard Corps’.
Volunteer Legion Netherlands	July 1941	Dutch	n/a	Formed by the Waffen‐SS, led by Dutch officers. In April 1943 became the SS‐Freiwilligen Panzergrenadier Brigade ‘Nederland’ and in January 1945 absorbed in the 23rd SS Volunteer Panzer Grenadier Division 'Nederland'.
German-Croatian SS Police and Gendarmerie	March 1943	Croatian volunteers or conscripts with German and Volksdeutsche cadres.	32,000	A police force under the command of the German Reichsführer-SS Plenipotentiary for Croatia SS-Brigadeführer Konstantin Kammerhofer.
Serbian Volunteer Corps	November 1944	Serbian	9,886	Serbian collaborationist militia, placed under Waffen SS command during the German withdrawal from Serbia.
Serbian Gestapo	July 1942	Serbian	121	Disbanded in February 1944
Dinara Division	December 1944	Serbian	3,000–6,000	Chetnik formation, placed under SS command in December 1944
Serbian State Guard	December 1944	Serbian	25,000–36,000	Serbian collaborationist formation, placed under SS command in December 1944
St. Wenceslas Company	March 1945	Czech volunteers	13	
Slovene Home Army	September 1943	Slovene	n/a	Formed from collaborationist units under SS control
SS Polizei – Selbstschutz – Regiment Sandschak	July 1944	Albanian Muslims (from Kosovo and Sandžak)	4,000	Albanian Muslim unit set up in the Sandžak by SS and Police Leader Karl von Krempler
Breton SS Armed Formation	Dec 1943	French Bretons	80	Established by the Sicherheitsdienst
British Free Corps	January 1944	British PoWs	54	Initially called the "Legion of St. George".
SS East Turk Armed Formation	July 1944	Turkic ethnic groups	3,000	Formed from the merging of the Turkestan unit, a Soviet Muslim formation established in January 1944.
Tatar Legions	n/a	n/a	n/a	
Kaukasische Waffenverband der SS	4 November 1944	Armenian, Azerbaijani, Georgian and North Caucasian volunteers	1,525	Formed at Paluzza, north-east Italy. Still undergoing training at surrender to British forces 8 May 1945 without having seen combat.

== Waffen-SS volunteers and conscripts by country ==
Country	Volunteers
Albania	6,500 to 8,000
Belgium	18,000 (about "evenly divided between Flemings and Walloons")
Bohemia and Moravia	77
Denmark	6,000
Estonia	20,000 officially (Note: Historian Rolf-Dieter Müller points out that an additional 20,000 Estonians served in SS frontier guard regiments.)
Finland	1,180 to 3,000
Hungary	15,000
(British Raj) India	4,500
Italy	20,000
Latvia	80,000 (Note: Historian Andrejs Plakans puts this figure at 100,000.)
Netherlands	20,000 to 25,000 (Note: See: http://publications.niod.knaw.nl/publications/Veld_SSenNederland_01.pdf)
Norway	6,000
Sweden	180 (Note: See: Bosse Schön, "Svenskarna som stred för Hitler" ("The Swedes who fought for Hitler"), (2000) [1999], ISBN 978-9-1765-7208-5, p. 119 + 4 unnumbered pages (a photo of Christmas greetings for named men of the "Swedish" Waffen-SS unit Sveaborg in the Swedish pro-Nazi paper/magazine "Den Svenske" Swedes and Estonian-Swedish Waffen-SS volunteers fought in various SS units. Bosse Schön identifies various units. Many of them were from Norrland, Stockholm, Göteborg and had fought for Finland. A significant number of them were members of NSAP/SSS with about 60% between 17 and 25 years of age. Also see: https://www.svd.se/aventyret-lockade-svenskar-till-ss)
Switzerland	Approximately 1,300 (Note: Of particular note was Swiss-born SS Colonel Franz Riedweg, the de facto leader of the Germanische Leitstelle's Germanic recruits. Riedweg gave a speech in 1943, criticizing the manner in which the SS handled the escape of 7,000 Danish Jews from Nazi-held territory. He and fellow Germanic volunteers from neutral Denmark, Sweden and Switzerland were stripped of leadership roles and sent to the Eastern Front, where most perished. See: Richard Byers, "Byers on Gutmann, 'Building a Nazi Europe: The SS's Germanic Volunteers'", H-War (August 2018) at: https://networks.h-net.org/node/12840/reviews/2140807/byers-gutmann-building-nazi-europe-sss-germanic-volunteers)
United Kingdom	54

== See also ==
- List of Waffen-SS units
- Non-Germans in the German armed forces during World War II
- Waffen-SS in popular culture
- Wehrmacht foreign volunteers and conscripts

== Bibliography ==
- Afiero, M.; Bujeiro, R. (2020). Dutch Waffen-SS Legion & Brigade 1941–44. Men-at-Arms. Bloomsbury Publishing. ISBN 978-1-4728-4030-1.
- Afiero, M.; Bujeiro, R. (2021). Belgian Waffen-SS Legions & Brigades, 1941–1944: Wallonie, Wallonien, Flandern & Langemarck. Men-at-Arms. Bloomsbury Publishing. ISBN 978-1-4728-4429-3.
- André, G.; André, W.; Kohlbauer, C. (2022). OPPORTUNITY – The power of resistance: English Version. INSEPARABLE – The Trilogy of Adventures. tredition. ISBN 978-3-347-58486-0.
- Avalon Project. "Avalon Project–Yale University". Judgement: The Accused Organizations.
- Bender, R.J. (1971). Uniforms, organisations and history of the Waffen SS. Scott. OCLC 1185009240.
- Béraud, Y. (2021). German Mountain Troops 1942–45. Casemate Illustrated. Casemate Publishers. ISBN 978-1-61200-947-6.
- Bernád, D.; Kliment, C.K. (2015). Magyar Warriors. Volume 1: The History of the Royal Hungarian Armed Forces 1919–1945. Helion, Limited. ISBN 978-1-912174-49-2.
- Bougarel, Xavier; Korb, Alexander; Petke, Stefan; Zaugg, Franziska (2017). "Muslim SS units in the Balkans and the Soviet Union". In Jochen Böhler; Robert Gerwarth (eds.). The Waffen-SS: A European History. Oxford University Press. ISBN 978-0-19-879055-6.
- Brnardic, V.; Aralica, V. (2016). World War II Croatian Legionaries: Croatian Troops under Axis Command 1941–45. Men-at-Arms. Bloomsbury Publishing. ISBN 978-1-4728-1769-3.
- Broderick, George (2005). "The Breton Movement and the German Occupation 1940–44. Alan Heusaff and Bezen Perrot: A Case Study" (PDF). Form und Struktur in der Sprache. Festschrift für Elmar Ternes.
- Buttar, Prit (2013). Between Giants: The Battle for the Baltics in World War II. London: Bloomsbury Publishing. ISBN 978-1-4728-0287-3.
- Christie, S. (2003). General Franco Made Me a 'terrorist': The Interesting Years Abroad of a West of Scotland 'baby-boomer'. Christie file. S. Christie. ISBN 978-1-873976-19-7.
- Estes, K. (2015). A European Anabasis: Western European Volunteers in the German Army and SS, 1940–45. Helion. ISBN 978-1-912174-25-6.
- Flaherty, T. H. (2004) [1988]. The Third Reich: The SS. Time-Life. ISBN 1-84447-073-3.
- Forbes, Robert (2010) [2006]. For Europe: The French Volunteers of the Waffen-SS. Stackpole Books. ISBN 978-0-8117-3581-0.
- Gilbert, Adrian (2019). Waffen-SS: Hitler's Army at War. New York: Da Capo Press. ISBN 978-0-306-82465-4.
- Griffiths, Richard (2005). Fascism. London: Continuum. ISBN 978-0-8264-7856-6.
- Gutmann, Martin R. (2017). Building a Nazi Europe: The SS's Germanic Volunteers. Cambridge and New York: Cambridge University Press. ISBN 978-1-107-15543-5.
- Hale, Christopher (2011). Hitler's Foreign Executioners: Europe's Dirty Secret. The History Press. ISBN 978-0-7524-5974-5.
- Hetmanchuk, M. P. (2019). "Foreign military formations of the SS – European Army of the Third Reich (1939–1945)". Гілея: Науковий Вісник. 141 (1). Українська академія наук, Національний педагогічний університет імені М. П. Драгоманова: 38–42. ISSN 2076-1554.
- Johansen, C. (2016). Hitler's Nordic Ally?: Finland and the Total War 1939–1945. Pen and Sword. ISBN 978-1-4738-5315-7.
- Jokipii, Mauno (2002). Hitlerin Saksa ja sen vapaaehtoisliikkeet: Waffen-SS:n suomalaispataljoona vertailtavana. Helsinki: Suomalaisen Kirjallisuuden Seura. ISBN 951-746-335-9.
- Kott, Matthew; Bubnys, Arūnas; Kraft, Ülle (2017). "The Baltic States: Auxiliaries and Waffen-SS Soldiers from Estonia, Latvia, and Lithuania". In Jochen Böhler; Robert Gerwarth (eds.). The Waffen-SS: A European History. Oxford and New York: Oxford University Press. ISBN 978-0-19-879055-6.
- Kursietis, A.J.; Munoz, A.J. (1999). The Hungarian Army and Its Military Leadership in World War II. Axis Europa Books. Axis Europa Books & Magazines. ISBN 978-1-891227-28-8.
- Lappalainen, Niilo (1997). Aselevon jälkeen. WSOY. ISBN 951-0-21813-8.
- Koehl, Robert (2004). The SS: A History 1919–45. Stroud: Tempus. ISBN 978-0-7524-2559-7.
- Larsson, Lars T. (2015). Hitler's Swedes: A History of the Swedish Volunteers in the Waffen-SS. Helion & Company. ISBN 978-1-909384-11-8.
- Lepre, G. (1997). Himmler's Bosnian Division: The Waffen-SS Handschar Division, 1943–1945. Schiffer military history. Schiffer Military History. ISBN 978-0-7643-0134-6.
- Littlejohn, D. (1979). Foreign Legions of the Third Reich Vol. 2. R.J. Bender Pub. ISBN 978-0-912138-22-0.
- Littlejohn, David (1987). Foreign Legions of the Third Reich Vol. 1 Norway, Denmark, France. Bender Publishing. ISBN 978-0912138176.
- Littlejohn, David (1987b). Foreign Legions of the Third Reich, Vol. 2, Belgium, Great Britain, Holland, Italy and Spain. Bender Publishing. ISBN 978-0-91213-822-0.
- Littlejohn, D. (1994). Foreign Legions of the Third Reich Vol.3. R. James Bender Publishing. ISBN 978-0-912138-29-9.
- Longerich, Peter (2012). Heinrich Himmler: A Life. Oxford; New York: Oxford University Press. ISBN 978-0-19-959232-6.
- Lloret, M.P. (2020). Europa como refugio. Reflejos fílmicos de los exilios españoles (1939-2016). Comunicación activa. Cine (in Spanish). Universitat de Barcelona, Edicions. ISBN 978-84-9168-365-0.
- Lumans, Valdis O. (2 July 2012). "The Ethnic Germans of the Waffen-SS in Combat: Dregs or Gems?". In Sanders Marble (ed.). Scraping the Barrel: The Military Use of Sub-Standard Manpower. New York: Fordham University Press. pp. 197–224. ISBN 978-0-8232-3977-1.
- Manes, L. (2023). Albanian units in the Second World War. Witness to War. Soldiershop Publishing. ISBN 979-1-255-89047-8.
- Marković, D.; Milovanović, N.B.; Rebić, Đ. (1979). Ratnici mira: Rat. Biblioteka Kompas (in Serbian). Sloboda.
- McCroden, W.T.; Nutter, T.E. (2019). German Ground Forces of World War II: Complete Orders of Battle for Army Groups, Armies, Army Corps, and Other Commands of the Wehrmacht and Waffen SS, September 1, 1939, to May 8, 1945. Savas Beatie. ISBN 978-1-61121-101-6.
- McNab, Chris (2009). The SS: 1923–1945. Amber Books Ltd. ISBN 978-1-906626-49-5.
- Merriam, R. (1999). Waffen-SS. World War II Arsenal Series. Merriam Press. ISBN 978-1-57638-168-7.
- Mitcham, S.W. (2007). German Order of Battle: Panzer, Panzer Grenadier, and Waffen SS divisions in World War II. Stackpole Books. ISBN 978-0-8117-3438-7.
- Młynarczyk, Jacek Andrzej; Rein, Leonid; Bolianovskyi, Andrii; Romanko, Oleg (2017). "Eastern Europe: Belarusian Auxiliaries, Ukrainian Waffen-SS Soldiers and the Special Case of the Polish 'Blue Police'". In Jochen Böhler; Robert Gerwarth (eds.). The Waffen-SS: A European History. Oxford and New York: Oxford University Press. ISBN 978-0-19-879055-6.
- Mole, Richard C.M. (2012). The Baltic States from the Soviet Union to the European Union: Identity, Discourse and Power in the Post-Communist Transition of Estonia, Latvia and Lithuania. London and New York: Routledge. ISBN 978-0-415-39497-0.
- Mueggenberg, Brent (2020). The Cossack Struggle Against Communism, 1917–1945. McFarland. ISBN 978-1-4766-3802-7.
- Müller, Rolf-Dieter (2012). The Unknown Eastern Front: The Wehrmacht and Hitler's Foreign Soldiers. New York: I.B. Taurus. ISBN 978-1-78076-072-8.
- Muñoz, A.J. (2001). The East Came West: Muslim, Hindu and Buddhist Volunteers in the German Armed Forces, 1941–1945. Axis Europa Books. Axis Europa Books. ISBN 978-1-891227-39-4.
- Odegard, W.W.; Deeter, R.E. (1968). Foreign Volunteers of Hitler's Germany. DO Enterprises.
- Pajunen, Jussi; Karjalainen, Mikko (2019). "Finnish Volunteer Battalion of the Waffen SS in 1941–1943 and Related Finnish studies" (PDF). Finno-German Yearbook of Political Economy. 2. Archived (PDF) from the original on 2021-10-19.
- Pencz, R. (2010). For the Homeland: The 31st Waffen-SS Volunteer Grenadier Division in World War II. Stackpole military history series. Stackpole Books. ISBN 978-0-8117-3582-7.
- Plakans, Andrejs (2011). A Concise History of the Baltic States. Cambridge and New York: Cambridge University Press. ISBN 978-0-521-83372-1.
- Radanović, M. (2016). Kazna i zločin: snage kolaboracije u Srbiji : odgovornost za ratne zločine (1941–1944) i vojni gubici (1944–1945) (in Croatian). Rosa Luxemburg Stiftung, Regionalna kancelarija za jugoistočnu Evropu. ISBN 978-86-88745-16-1.
- Ramet, S.P. (2020). The Independent State of Croatia 1941–45. Taylor & Francis. ISBN 978-1-00-015499-3.
- Rein, L. (2011). The Kings and the Pawns: Collaboration in Byelorussia during World War II. War and Genocide. Berghahn Books. ISBN 978-0-85745-043-2.
- Reitlinger, Gerald (1989). The SS: Alibi of a Nation, 1922–1945. Da Capo Press. ISBN 978-0-306-80351-2.
- van Roekel, E. (2022). As political soldiers we face Moscow's hordes: Dutch volunteers in the Waffen-SS. Series in World History. Vernon Press. ISBN 978-1-64889-334-6.
- Rubin, B.; Schwanitz, W.G. (2014). Nazis, Islamists, and the Making of the Modern Middle East. Yale University Press. ISBN 978-0-300-14090-3.
- Savin, Kyryl (2021). "Coming to terms with the past (23 March 2021)". Deutsche Welle.
- Shkandrij, M. (2023). In the Maelstrom: The Waffen-SS 'Galicia' Division and Its Legacy. McGill-Queen's University Press. ISBN 978-0-2280-1654-0.
- Stackelberg, Roderick (2002). Hitler's Germany: Origins, Interpretations, Legacies. Routledge. ISBN 9781--13463-529-0.
- Stahel, D. (2018). Joining Hitler's Crusade. Cambridge University Press. ISBN 978-1-316-51034-6.
- Stein, George H (1984). The Waffen SS: Hitler's Elite Guard at War, 1939–1945. Cornell University Press. ISBN 978-0-8014-9275-4.
- Tessin, G. (1965). Verbände und Truppen der deutschen Wehrmacht und Waffen SS im Zweiten Weltkrieg 1939–1945: -13. Bd. Die Landstreitkräfte: Namensverbände 1-13400 (in German). Mittler.
- Tessin, Georg; Kannapin, Norbert (2000). Waffen-SS und Ordnungspolizei im Kriegseinsatz 1939–1945 (in German). Osnabrück: Biblio Verlag. doi:10.1080/13518040701378360. S2CID 144741225.
- Thomas, Nigel (2020-08-20). Hitler's Eastern Legions 1942–45. Bloomsbury Publishing. ISBN 978-1-4728-3952-7.
- Thomas, N.; Jurado, C.C.; Pavlovic, D. (2012). Germany's Eastern Front Allies (2): Baltic Forces. Men-at-Arms. Bloomsbury Publishing. ISBN 978-1-78096-734-9.
- Thurlow, Richard (1998). Fascism in Britain: A History, 1918–1945. I.B. Tauris. ISBN 978-1-86064-337-8.
- Tomasevich, J. (2001). War and Revolution in Yugoslavia, 1941–1945: Occupation and Collaboration. ACLS Humanities E-Book. Stanford University Press. ISBN 978-0-8047-7924-1.
- Tomasevich, J. (2002). War and Revolution in Yugoslavia, 1941–1945: Occupation and Collaboration. ACLS Humanities E-Book. Stanford University Press. ISBN 978-0-8047-7924-1.
- U.S. Government (1949). Hearings Before Subcommittee No. 4 of the Committee on the Judiciary House of Representatives, Eightieth Congress, Second Session on H.R. 1285, H.R. 4928, H.R. 5040, and H.R. 5192. Washington D.C.: U.S. Government Printing Office. OCLC 54523633.
- Walters, G. (2010). Hunting Evil: How the Nazi War Criminals Escaped and the Hunt to Bring Them to Justice. Bantam. ISBN 978-0-553-81939-7.
- Weale, Adrian (2010). The SS: A New History. Little, Brown. ISBN 978-1-4087-0304-5.
- Westerlund, Lars (2010). Sotatapahtumia, internointeja ja siirto sodanjälkeisiin oloihin. Kansallisarkisto Riksarkivet. OCLC 748681863.
- Westerlund, Lars (2019). The Finnish SS Volunteers and Atrocities 1941–1943 (PDF). The National Archives of Finland and Finnish Literature Society. ISBN 978-951-858-111-9. Archived (PDF) from the original on 2021-08-23.
- Wegner, Bernd (1990). The Waffen-SS: Organization, Ideology and Function. Blackwell. ISBN 0-631-14073-5.
- Wegner, Bernd (2010). Hitlers Politische Soldaten: Die Waffen-SS, 1933–1945 (in German). Paderborn: Ferdinand Schöningh. ISBN 978-3-506-76313-6.
- Zabecki, D.T. (2015). World War II in Europe: An Encyclopedia. Military History of the United States. Taylor & Francis. ISBN 978-1-135-81242-3.
- Zakić, M. (2017). Ethnic Germans and National Socialism in Yugoslavia in World War II. Cambridge University Press. ISBN 978-1-107-17184-8.
- Cohen, Philip J. (1996). Serbia's Secret War: Propaganda and the Deceit of History. College Station: Texas A&M University Press. ISBN 978-0-89096-760-7.
- Ramet, Sabrina P. (2006). The Three Yugoslavias: State-Building and Legitimation, 1918–2005. Bloomington: Indiana University Press. ISBN 978-0-253-34656-8.
