= Chortiatis massacre =

WWII atrocity in Greece

Chortiatis Massacre
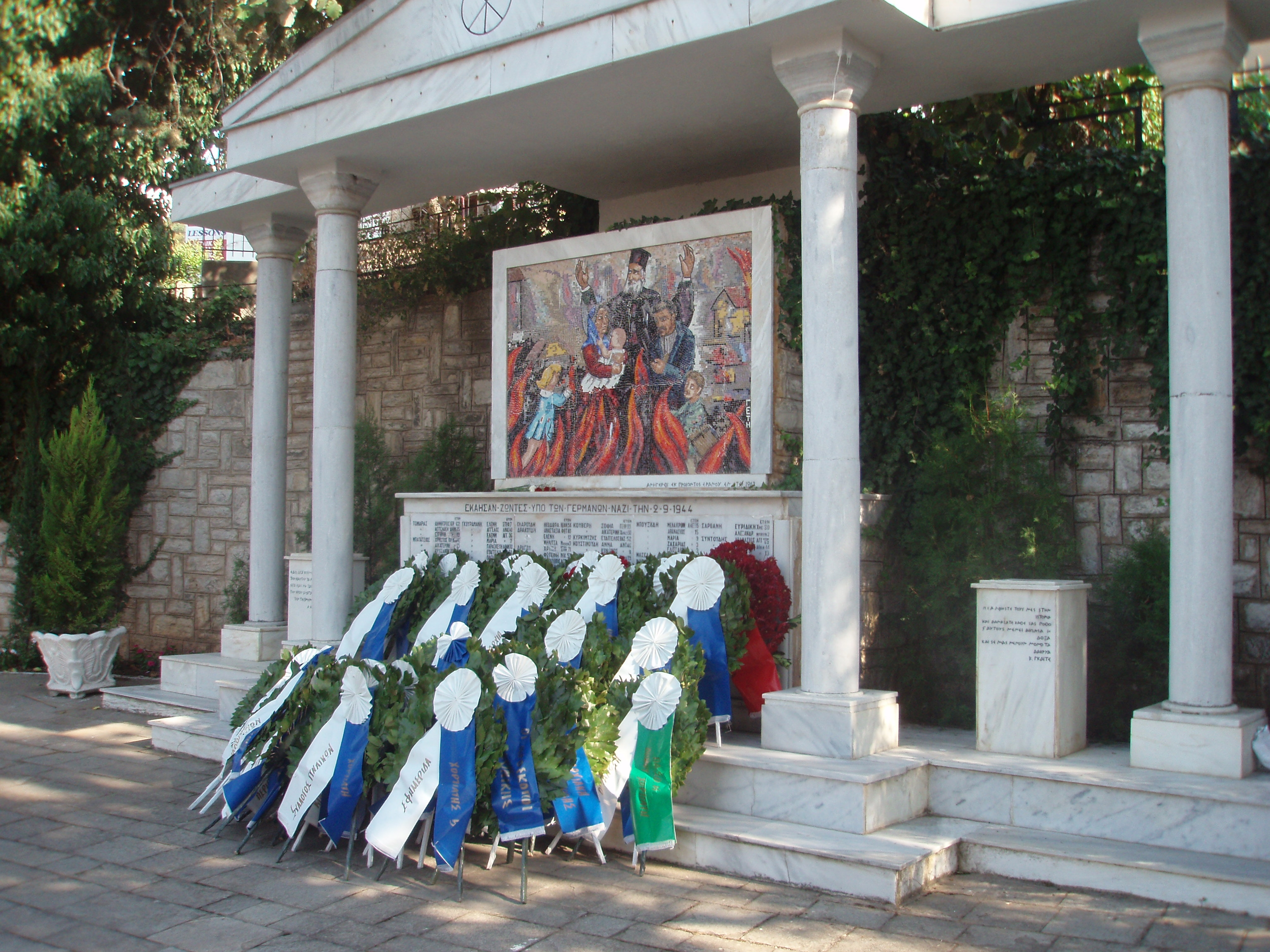
- Chortiatis Massacre memorial
- Location: Chortiatis, Greece
- Date: 2 September 1944
- Target: Civilians
- Attack type: Summary executions
- Deaths: 146
- Perpetrators: Security Battalions; Jagdkommando Schubert; Wehrmacht

The Chortiatis Massacre (Greek: Σφαγή του Χορτιάτη) was a violent reprisal by the Greek collaborationist Security Battalions and German army troops during the Axis Occupation of Greece. On 2 September 1944, a platoon of Greek People's Liberation Army (ELAS) fighters ambushed a government water supply column outside Chortiatis village. Several hours later an Axis punitive expedition into the area led to the destruction of the village and the parallel execution of 146 of its citizens, most of whom were women and children.

== Background ==
On 28 October 1940, Italy began the Italo-Greek War, expecting a swift victory but the invasion failed and the Italians were pushed back into Albania. As the war dragged on into its sixth month, Germany was forced to intervene to support its struggling ally. The small Greek force defending the Greco–Bulgarian border was defeated by the better-equipped and numerically-superior Germans. The German penetration deep into Greece made further resistance at the Albanian front pointless, ending the Battle of Greece in the favor of the Axis Powers. The British conducted an evacuation and Greece was subjected to a Triple Occupation by Germany, Italy and Bulgaria. Soon, Resistance groups began being formed, and by 1942, the communist-led Greek People's Liberation Army (ELAS), became the dominant resistance organization in the country. Right-wing resistance organizations such as the National Republican Greek League (EDES), National and Social Liberation (EKKA) and Defenders of Northern Greece (YBE) played a much smaller role.

Operation Steinadler (3–13 July 1944) was the last counter-insurgency operation carried out by German forces in Macedonia. Although wide in its scope it ultimately failed to achieve its objectives as ELAS fighters successfully evaded the German patrols, returning to their hideouts once the operation was over. The civilian population thus became the main target for Axis reprisals. Shortly afterwards the German 1st Mountain Division and the 4th SS Polizei Panzergrenadier Division departed from the country, while in August Army Group E declared Greece a war zone. German shops and cultural institutions were closed, while civilians and older member of the army, secret police and SS were evacuated. Under Adolf Hitler's orders the Wehrmacht adopted the policy of total war, in response to the rise of ELAS subversive activity which had hampered the summer harvest in areas still controlled by the collaborationist government. Army Group E's staff deemed the preceding Distomo massacre and 1 May 1944 Kaisariani executions as excessive and even damaging to the image of the occupational authorities. The staff stressed the need to arrest insurgents rather than resorting to the collective punishment of civilians. Nevertheless, those orders were disregarded and atrocities continued unhindered. Between June and August, ELAS attacks led to the death of 30 German soldiers, 14 were wounded and 9 more were missing in action. German reprisals in their turn included the execution of 254 people.

German occupational authorities further attempted to instill terror in the population of western Macedonia by deploying the collaborationist Poulos Verband and Jagdkommando Schubert, headed by Georgios Poulos and Friedrich Schubert respectively. These units were stationed in Krya Vrysi and Asvestochori, creating a protective axis around Thessaloniki, while Thessaloniki itself was garrisoned by the collaborationist government's Security Battalions. Schubert's previous imprisonment by the Germans, who condemned his ruthlessness and employment of former convicts during his deployment in Crete, was now disregarded, as all available forces were required for the Axis counter insurgency campaign. The pressure from the ELAS attacks around Thessaloniki threatened the ongoing German evacuation of southern Greece; Army Group E came to the conclusion that a show of force was necessary.

== Massacre ==
Location of Chortiatis.

On 2 September, a platoon of ELAS fighters ambushed a government water supply column outside Chortiatis, killing a single driver and gravely injuring his passenger. Half an hour later a second car came under fire on the same location. One German soldier was wounded and taken prisoner along with two Greek workers, whilst the Greek driver and a second soldier managed to flee to Asvestochori. When the denizens of Chortiatis expressed their fears regarding a potential German reprisal towards Antonis Kazakos (the head of the ELAS platoon), he appeared dismissive, exclaiming "This area is part of a free Greece. No German will dare to step his foot into this land". Shortly afterwards a Wehrmacht patrol spotted a burning car outside Chortiatis, confirming that an attack had taken place. Kazakos convinced the civilian population of Chortiatis to remain in place, but unbeknownst to him 20 cars loaded with German and Schubert's soldiers were already on their way towards the village. The ELAS band and its captives departed to Livadi, whilst the local men left the village for the surrounding fields even earlier. Upon surrounding the village, the Germans assembled the remaining women and children at the village square, while a second group was taken to the local cafe. When the village mayor Christos Batatsiou attempted to beg the Germans for mercy he was stabbed with a knife by Schubert and taken away by his men, who proceeded to loot and burn 300 houses. The women and children from the square were then forced into the house of Evangelos Davoudis where they were burned alive, only two of them managing to survive. Schubert's men led the second group of civilians into the bakery of Stefanos Gouramanis while one of them played a violin and others sang cheerfully. A machine gun was placed in one of the bakery's windows, gunning down those standing inside. Eight children managed to escape the carnage by climbing out of a small window in the back of the building. Afterwards the collaborationists placed grass on the corpses and set them aflame with a flare gun. Several survivors tried to make an escape but they were stabbed and pushed back by Schubert's men, only one man and one woman absconded through the smoke when they were distracted by the village priest. Five women managed to evade death by claiming that their relatives served in the Security Battalions. Eleven civilians were captured and executed in the vicinity of the village, among them one woman was raped.

== Aftermath ==
The number of casualties totaled 146 people, including 109 women and 37 men ranging from the age of two months to 81 years. 34 were burned alive in the Davoudis house, 76 were killed in the bakery, 34 were shot or stabbed in their homes or outside the village. Following the destruction of Chortiatis, the Axis forces returned to their bases in Asvestochori and Thessaloniki. Fearing the return of the penal expedition and repulsed by the smell emanating from the corpses, the surviving inhabitants of Chortiatis hid in the surrounding forest. Two days later Schubert's men returned to the village to strip it of what little they had left on their previous visit. The Chortiatis massacre was not mentioned in any form in the contemporary German documents. Similarly, during course of the Nuremberg trials, then chief of staff of Army Group E Wilhelm Hammer, only referred to the ambush preceding the massacre. None of the Germans responsible for the massacre were ever convicted of their crimes. Many of them continued to advance their careers in the years that followed the war: Army Group E intelligence officer Kurt Waldheim later became the ninth President of Austria. Schubert on the other hand was arrested in the aftermath of the war, tried and executed in Athens.

== See also ==
- Meligalas
