= Ivan Kononov =

Soviet and Nazi commander (1900–1967)

Ivan Nikitich Kononov
- Иван Никитич Кононов
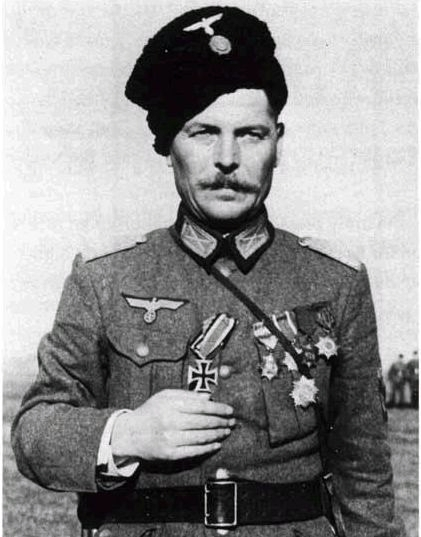
- Kononov during World War II
- Born: 2 April 1900; Novoazovsk, Russian Empire
- Died: 15 September 1967 (aged 67); Adelaide, Australia
- Military career
- Allegiance: Soviet Union (1922–1941); Nazi Germany (1941–1945)
- Branch: (Soviet Union) Red Army (Nazi Germany) Wehrmacht (Nazi Germany) Waffen-SS
- Service years: 1922–1945
- Rank: Major (Red Army); Colonel (Wehrmacht); Major General (KONR)
- Commands: 436th Rifle Regiment, 155th Rifle Division (Soviet); Kosaken-Abteilung 600 (German); 5th Don Cossack Cavalry Regiment, 1st Cossack Division; 3rd Plastun Brigade, XV SS Cossack Cavalry Corps
- Conflicts: Soviet invasion of Poland; Winter War; Operation Barbarossa; Nazi security warfare in Belarus; World War II in Yugoslavia
- Awards: (Soviet Union) Order of the Red Star (deprived) (Nazi Germany) Iron Cross, 1st Class

Ivan Nikitich Kononov (2 April 1900 (Note: In Red Army documents, Kononov's date of birth is listed as 1906.) – 15 September 1967) was a Soviet Red Army commander who became one of the earliest and most prominent Cossack military collaborators with Nazi Germany following the 1941 Axis invasion of the Soviet Union. After building a successful career in the Soviet army, Kononov defected to the Wehrmacht in August 1941. Authorized by the German command to form a Cossack unit, he raised an auxiliary force by recruiting from prisoner-of-war camps. Eventually expanding to a battalion, it became a key asset in Germany's punitive rear-security campaigns in occupied Belarus in 1942 and 1943.

In the summer of 1943, Kononov's unit, expanded to a regiment, was integrated into the 1st Cossack Division (later XV SS Cossack Cavalry Corps) and deployed to Yugoslavia. Before the Cossack collaborationist formations surrendered to the British in Austria in May 1945, he escaped into the American occupation zone in Germany. Kononov thus evaded the subsequent forced repatriation of Cossacks to the Soviet Union, eventually immigrating to Australia under an assumed identity. In the postwar era, his legacy was distorted by a romanticized 1961 biography, General Kononov, authored by a former subordinate. Kononov died in 1967.

== Family background ==
Ivan Kononov was born the son of a Don Cossack captain (yesaul) in 1900. In the Cold War-era account of his life, Kononov's lifelong animus against the Soviet regime is explained by the effects of the Russian Civil War and the Stalinist repression. In this retelling, when Bolshevik forces occupied his native stanitsa (village) in 1918, they hanged his father and shot his mother. To obscure his politically perilous "bourgeois" origin, he followed his aunt's advice to conceal his identity by volunteering for the Red Army as a simple laborer in 1922.

In contrast, recent research by the historian Mark Edele shows that Kononov provided conflicting accounts of his family's victimization by the Soviet state. In a collaborationist Cossack magazine in 1944, he cited his brother being arrested in 1938, while in an 1941 account to German interrogators, he listed his brother and father-in-law as having been executed in the 1937 purges. In neither of these wartime accounts did he mention his parents falling victim to the Bolshevik terror during the Russian civil war. Thus, the post-war account might have been an embellishment.

== Career in the Red Army ==
Kononov served within Semyon Budyonny's First Cavalry Army, eventually completing an advanced tactical course in Moscow in 1927. He maintained a seemingly exemplary Soviet political profile; he was admitted to candidate membership of the Communist Party in 1928 and achieved full party status in 1929 with an unblemished record.

In 1935, Kononov graduated from the prestigious Frunze Military Academy. These credentials elevated him to a general staff officer on the Operational Staff of the Red Army's 2nd Cavalry Corps. Kononov served with distinction during the 1939 Soviet invasion of Poland and the Winter War against Finland reaching the rank of Major. For his gallantry during the Winter War, Kononov was decorated with the Order of the Red Star. During the campaign, he received a battlefield promotion to a regimental commander.

== Collaboration with Nazi Germany ==
At the start of the German invasion of the Soviet Union, Kononov commanded the 436th Rifle Regiment of the 155th Rifle Division. On 22 August 1941, while encircled by German troops near Mogilev, Kononov crossed the frontlines to surrender to the Wehrmacht. He justified his defection to his German interrogators by citing a deep-seated hatred for Joseph Stalin's regime and his background as a Cossack, and requested permission to form an anti-Soviet unit. In a series of debriefings, Kononov provided detailed intelligence on Red Army's organization and tactics. He was then sent to recuperate at an officers' sanatorium. While Kononov's post-war accounts romanticized his record by claiming he ordered his entire regiment to defect en masse, contemporary German interrogation logs and archival records demonstrate that he defected with only two fellow officers and a sergeant. Following his frontline defection, a Soviet military tribunal convicted him in absentia of high treason, officially stripping him of his rank and all state honors.

=== Belarus ===
German military intelligence, the Abwehr, immediately recognized Kononov's utility for anti-Soviet mobilization. In a September interrogation, he reiterated his request for a command of a unit to fight on the German side, which was granted. Because he had defected with only a handful of men, Kononov built the ranks from deadly German prisoner-of-war camps across Belarus, targeting captured Soviet soldiers with Cossack lineages or anti-Bolshevik grievances. Because of racial prejudices and specific Hitler's directives, the unit was designated as Cossack rather than Russian. Again, Kononov's post-war account differs from that of 1944; in the biography, he approached Max von Schenckendorff, commander of Army Group Center Rear Area, personally, and then recruited only the best and the brightest volunteers by giving rousing speeches, with the formation complete by mid-September 1941. In the 1944 account (and according to archival records), the permission was granted via telegram, with the order dated late October 1941, at which point formation commenced.

Kononov's force was organized as an auxiliary security unit; it was designated as Kosaken-Hundertschaft 102 (sotnia) and deployed in occupied Belarus for counter-insurgency and rear-area security tasks. By August 1942, it was expanded to battalion size and redesignated Kosaken-Abteilung 600. Over the course of 1942, Kononov employed brutal counter-insurgency tactics under the German security doctrine of Bandenbekämpfung ("combatting bandits") that dissolved the line between armed combatants and local civilians. (Note: The literal translation of the German compound word Bandenbekämpfung is "combatting bandits" or "combatting gangs." Following Führer Directive No. 46 in August 1942, Adolf Hitler officially prohibited the term "partisan" (Partisanen) in military registries and ordered all irregular forces to be designated as "bandits" (Banden). By linguistically reclassifying resistance groups and their rural support base as common criminal outlaws rather than military combatants, the German command created a legal vacuum that systematically authorized mass executions and scorched-earth tactics entirely outside the framework of international law.) The operations in "bandit-infested" areas amounted to destruction of villages, seizure of livestock, deporting of able-bodied population for slave labour to Germany and murder of those of non-working age.

Kononov's detachment functioned as a key rear-security tool for German commands. It participated in many of the core punitive operations in Eastern Belarus and Smolensk region: Operation Bamberg, 6 March–6 April 1942, north and south of Bobruisk; Operation Adler, July–August 1942, in the Bobruisk-Mogilev-Berezino area; Operation Blitz, 23 September–3 October 1942, in an area between Polotsk and Vitebsk; Operation Karlsbad, October 11–23, 1942; and others. The unit committed numerous atrocities, including looting, burning of villages, and killing its inhabitants. It received high marks from the chain of command for its efficiency. It was during these security sweeps that Schenckendorff, commander of Army Group Center Rear Area, inspected the force in October 1942, famously praising their combat readiness and "merciless" (rücksichtslos) methods toward the civilian population.

For his service in Belarus, Kononov was decorated with the War Merit Cross, 1st and 2nd class. Compared to other "Eastern battalions" staffed by former POWs, Kononov's unit enjoyed substantial confidence from the German command which was evidenced by a higher than typical proportion of indigenous, vs German, commanders within the unit. After a mass mutiny and desertion in another Eastern battalion in September 1942, all such units in the Army Group Center Rear Area were subordinated to security divisions, while the mutinous unit was disbanded. In contrast, the Cossack detachment's status was kept intact and it retained direct line to Schenckendorff. Morale was also higher than general, with the Cossacks being impervious to partisan propaganda that encouraged desertion, at least throughout 1942. Things began to shift in 1943, however. When new reinforcements arrived in March 1943 from POW camps in Germany, the recruits, apparently aware of the German defeat at Stalingrad, were less than eager to fight for the Germans. Some outright refused to join the unit, and next month two of its squadrons, plus an artillery battery, defected to the partisans. The remnants of the battalion were transferred to Poland to undergo replenishment in preparation for the consolidation of all Cossack units under a unified command structure.

=== Yugoslavia ===
Following the punitive campaigns in Belarus, the German High Command rewarded Kononov's brutal efficiency by formally expanding his detachment into the 5th Don Cossack Cavalry Regiment in the summer of 1943. Due to growing German political anxieties that deploying native Soviet defectors directly on the Eastern Front would trigger mass desertions back to the advancing Red Army, the regiment was absorbed into Major General Helmuth von Pannwitz's 1st Cossack Cavalry Division and transferred to the puppet Independent State of Croatia in September 1943, to replicate their counter-insurgency strategies against Yugoslav partisans. In an apparent recognition of Kononov's formal military education and regimental command in the Red Army, Kononov was the only Cossack regimental commander in the new division, all the rest being German.

In Yugoslavia, the Cossack division proved highly effective in mobile, anti-guerrilla operations, but their campaign was characterized by extreme brutality against the local populace, including mass lootings, the burning of villages, and summary executions of suspected partisan sympathizers. By late 1944, during the division's administrative transfer into the Waffen-SS command network as the XV SS Cossack Cavalry Corps, Kononov had already attained the rank of colonel. In December, the Cossacks fought an engagement against the Red Army near Pitomača, repulsing an attempt to cross the Drava River. Kononov, in command of the 5th Don Cossack Cavalry Regiment, was awarded the Iron Cross, 1st class, after the battle. Kononov later assumed command of the 3rd Plastun Brigade. In April 1945, General Andrey Vlasov’s Committee for the Liberation of the Peoples of Russia (KONR) promoted Kononov to Major General, appointing him Ataman of all Cossack collaborationist forces.

== Assumed identity and emigration ==
As Axis defenses collapsed in May 1945, Kononov successfully avoided the fate of fellow Cossack collaborators like Pyotr Krasnov and Timofey Domanov who were forcibly repatriated to the Soviet Union and executed for treason. Kononov managed to escape the mass surrender of the XV SS Cossack Cavalry Corps to the British forces, thus bypassing the later forced handovers. It is unclear how he got separated from his command; in one account, he unceremoniously 'packed his bags' and left; in another, he was ordered on 3 May to report to Vlasov's HQ to receive orders about surrender. In any event, he successfully crossed into the American occupation zone in Bavaria, where he lived under assumed identities near Munich.

Kononov remained a clandestine figure until he emerged inside the civilian Displaced Persons (DP) pipeline to file for international refugee status. He exploited early Cold War screening vulnerabilities by filing an application for assistance with the International Refugee Organization (IRO) under the pseudonym "Iwan Gorski". His documents reflect a made-up life story of a Polish citizen who had been born in Russian Taganrog before immigrating to Poland in 1937, later ending up in Germany.

By falsifying his history on his IRO documentation to present himself as a Polish DP, Kononov obtained clearance to leave Germany. In 1950, he immigrated to Australia with his wife and two children, permanently settling in South Australia, where his third child was born. Kononov lived in relative obscurity, after his offers of military service to the Australian government were met with no response in 1951. In 1964, he joined the Union for the Struggle for the Liberation of the Peoples of Russia, but otherwise his political activities were limited. Kononov's diaspora life ended on 15 September 1967, when he was either killed in a car crash or died from natural causes.

== Postwar depictions ==
The postwar narrative surrounding Kononov was fundamentally shaped by a highly romanticized, 1961 Russian-language biography, General Kononov, authored by his former subordinate officer, Konstantin Cherkasov (or Cherkassov). Most of the publications about Kononov's life directly or indirectly source major facts of his life from General Kononov, with the exception of works by Russian historian Kirill Aleksandrov. Published within anti-Soviet émigré circles in West Germany and Australia, Cherkasov's account amounted to a hagiography. Historian Mark Edele notes that complex, individual acts of wartime survival and opportunism were simplified into heroic tales of anti-communist resistance. It was not until the post-Cold War opening of former Soviet and German military archives that contemporary research dismantled Cherkasov's fabrications, proving the minimal, isolated scale of Kononov's actual 1941 defection and contextualizing the postwar biography as a deliberate piece of political myth-making.
