= XV SS Cossack Cavalry Corps =

- XV. SS-Kosaken-Kavallerie-Korps; 15-й казачий кавалерийский корпус СС
- Insignia of the 1st Cossack Division. The corps headquarters staff had a similar patch with crossed sabers and the Ataman's staff in between them.
- Active: 1944–1945
- Country: Germany
- Allegiance: Germany; Committee for the Liberation of the Peoples of Russia
- Branch: Waffen-SS; Russian Liberation Army
- Type: Cavalry
- Size: 20,000-25,000 (early 1945)
- Part of: Army Group F
- Engagements: World War II; Occupation of Yugoslavia

Commanders
- Notable commanders: Helmuth von Pannwitz; Ivan Kononov

The XV SS Cossack Cavalry Corps (Note: German: XV. SS-Kosaken-Kavallerie-Korps, Russian: 15-й казачий кавалерийский корпус СС) was a World War II cavalry corps of the Waffen-SS, the armed wing of the German Nazi Party, primarily recruited from Cossack collaborators. It was originally known as the XIV SS Cossack Cavalry Corps from September 1944, after Helmuth von Pannwitz's 1st Cossack Cavalry Division of the Wehrmacht was transferred to the SS, before being renumbered as XV in February 1945. The two brigades of the division were expanded when the corps was formed, so they became the new 1st and 2nd Cossack Cavalry Divisions. A third division was also planned on but never officially activated, with only one separate brigade being established. Although the corps was officially part of the Waffen-SS, its members never wore any SS insignia and its officers remained the same as before.

In late April 1945, shortly before the end of the war, the corps was transferred from the SS to the Armed Forces of the Committee for the Liberation of the Peoples of Russia, becoming the XV Cossack Cavalry Corps of the VS KONR. (Note: Russian: 15-й казачий кавалерийский корпус ВС КОНР) Ivan Kononov was appointed the corps commander with the title Ataman of All Cossack Forces, but this change was not implemented before the end of World War II in Europe. The Cossack Corps, led by Pannwitz, retreated from occupied Yugoslavia with the rest of the Wehrmacht's Army Group F and surrendered to the Western Allies in Austria in May 1945. The unit was forcibly repatriated to the Soviet Union in May and June 1945.

== Background ==
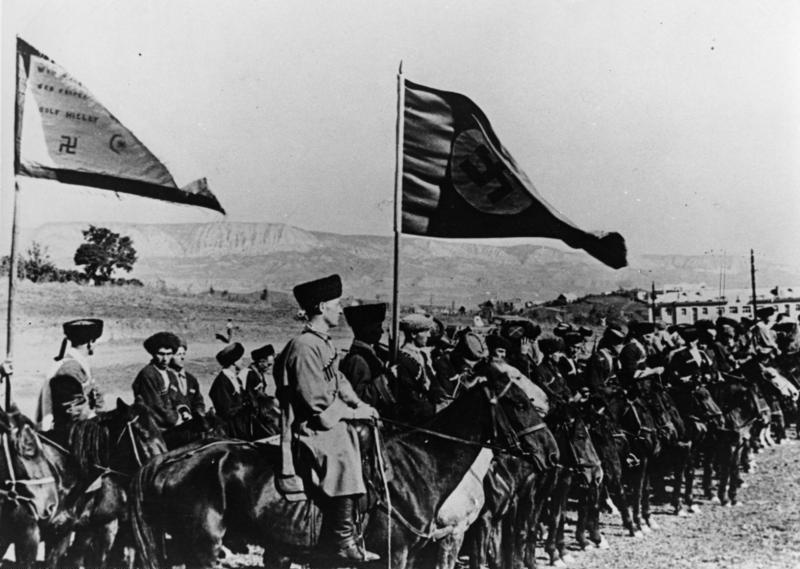
Cossacks in the Wehrmacht, 1942

During the Russian Civil War (1917–1923), Cossack leaders and their governments generally sided with the White movement. After the Soviets emerged victorious in the civil war, a policy of de-Cossackisation was instituted between 1919 and 1933, aimed at the elimination of the Cossacks as a separate cultural and political group. Cossacks in exile joined other Russian émigré groups in Central and Western Europe, while those in Russia endured continual repression.

To offset severe combat losses during World War II, the Wehrmacht leadership turned to the systemic exploitation of Soviet prisoners of war held in German stalags (POW camps). Thousands of captured Red Army soldiers, both of verifiable Cossack descent and regular Soviet conscripts who falsely claimed Cossack identity, chose survival through collaboration. By April 1943, about 25,000 troops served in 20 Cossack regiments, ranging in size from 400 to 1,000 personnel, almost all of them former POWs. Only about half were actually Cossacks. They had suffered repression under the Soviet rule and were thus more reliable for the Germans.

== Operational history ==
In the summer of 1944, Heinrich Himmler and the SS became interested in gaining control of the 1st Cossack Division under Helmuth von Pannwitz. In July 1944 Himmler discussed the organisation of a Cossack fighting unit in the Białystok region and requested from Adolf Hitler that the Cossack Division would be placed in the organisational structure of the SS. On 26 August 1944 he met with Pannwitz and his chief of staff. Himmler planned to gather all Cossack units to form a second Cossack division and proposed the transfer of the 1st Cossack Division to the SS. All units were to be placed under Pannwitz's command. Though initially reluctant, Pannwitz eventually agreed to place his division under SS administration. Both German cadre and Cossack troops would retain their traditional uniforms and their Wehrmacht or Cossack rank. Pannwitz hoped to raise his unit's low morale and to receive more supplies and better equipment. The Cossacks did not wear the SS runes or receive any ideological indoctrination.

In September 1944, the XIV SS Cossack Cavalry Corps was established on the basis of the 1st Cossack Division. The Cossacks fought an engagement against the Red Army on 25 December 1944 near Pitomača to prevent them from crossing the Drava River. The commander of the 5th Don Cossack Cavalry Regiment, Ivan Kononov, was awarded the Iron Cross, first class, after the battle.

In November 1944 the 1st Cossack Division was taken over by the Waffen-SS. The SS Führungshauptamt reorganised the division and used further Cossack combat units from the army and the Ordnungspolizei to form a 2nd Cossack Cavalry Division. Both divisions were placed under the command of the XV SS Cossack Cavalry Corps on 1 February 1945. With the transfer of the 5th Volunteer Cossack Depot Regiment from the Volunteer Depot Division on the same day the takeover of the Cossack units by the Waffen-SS was complete. According to Samuel J. Newland, the corps, composed of the 1st and 2nd Cavalry Brigades and the 1st and 2nd Division, was actually formed on 25 February 1945, when it was officially created by the High Command. The corps was initially subordinated to Army Group F in the Independent State of Croatia, and since March 1945 to Army Group E in Croatia. During their time there, they were known by the locals as Čerkezi ("Circassians"), despite the corps' Cossack ethnic makeup.

The corps supported the German offensive Operation Spring Awakening in Hungary by launching an offensive against a Soviet bridgehead at Valpovo on the Drava. During April the corps was engaged in minor actions.

== Surrender and repatriation ==
Towards the end of the war, the Cossack leadership expected the alliance between the Western Powers and the Soviet Union would collapse the moment Berlin fell, same as it did after World War I. In March 1945, Pannwitz sent a delegation to General Andrey Vlasov, commander of the collaborationist Russian Liberation Army. He thought that transferring his corps to Vlasov's Committee for the Liberation of the Peoples of Russia (KONR) would shield it from the stigma of being associated with the SS. Pannwitz hoped that this would make any alliance more palatable to the Western Allies. The formal transfer to KONR took place in late April, but had no practical effect as the war ended days later.

The XV SS Cossack Cavalry Corps surrendered on 11–12 May 1945, after retreating out of Yugoslavia and establishing contact with British troops near Völkermarkt, Austria. Pannwitz sought to set conditions so that his force would not be handed over to the Red Army, but his British interlocutor would have none of that. He demanded an unconditional surrender as were the terms for all German units. The 2nd SS Cossack Cavalry Division, which was covering the retreat of the 1st Division, was badly mauled in the fighting with Yugoslav Partisans but refused to surrender to them. Its final elements arrived in Austria on 15 May.

Initially, British troops did not guard the 18,000 to 20,000 combatants of the XV SS Cossack Cavalry Corps, just told them to stay within certain boundaries. On 15 May, British officers informed the senior commanders that the corps would likely be repatriated to the Soviet Union. Many German officers took the opportunity to desert; Pannwitz and the remainder of his staff chose to stay behind. On 26 May, British soldiers arrested Pannwitz and his staff and placed them under guard. The next day, the British military moved the rest of the corps to a high-security camp at Weitensfeld to prepare for the transfers. Officers hid the ultimate destination from the Cossacks, so the soldiers boarded the Weitensfeld-bound trucks without resistance. Over the next few days, British transports delivered the men, including Pannwitz, to Judenburg and handed them over to the Red Army.

Some personnel were exempted from repatriation on an individual basis. On the morning of the transfer from Weitensfeld, a group of Cossack officers protested claiming they were not Soviet citizens. A tense standoff ensued, during which two more British officers arrived and stated that, indeed, émigrés were to be exempt, as per the V Corps order. Upon interrogation, about 60 officers were determined to be Civil-War era refugees, and were thus retained.

The Soviet administration classified Cossack officers as "foreigners", grouping them with captured German personnel. Authorities treated rank-and-file Cossacks as Soviet citizens subject to state verification in filtration camps. Cossack officers and German POWs went to Prokopyevsk Camp No. 525, in the Kemerovo Region, under the Main Administration for Prisoners of War and Internees. The rank-and-file entered filtration camps for coal industry labor.

Following their delivery into Soviet custody, SMERSH segregated the senior Cossack leadership, including Pannwitz, and transported them to Moscow's Lubyanka and Lefortovo prisons. The six defendants were charged with war crimes, collaboration, high treason, and espionage against the Soviet state under Ukaz 39 and Article 58 of the Soviet penal code. The Military Collegium of the Supreme Court of the USSR conducted the closed trial on January 15–16, 1947. Judges found the defendants guilty and sentenced them to death. The sentence was final. The prisoners were hanged together in the courtyard of Lefortovo Prison on the evening of January 16, 1947.

Ivan Kononov, by then the nominal leader of all KONR Cossack forces, abandoned his command, crossed into the US occupation zone, and later emigrated to Australia under a false identity.

== Order of battle ==
As of February 1945:

- Corps troops
- 1st SS Cossack Cavalry Division
  - 1st Don Cossack Cavalry Regiment
  - 2nd Siberian Cossack Regiment
  - 4th Kuban Cossack Regiment
  - 1st Cossack Horse Artillery Regiment
- 2nd SS Cossack Cavalry Division
  - 3rd Kuban Cossack Regiment
  - 5th Don Cossack Regiment
  - 6th Terek Cossack Horse Regiment
  - 2nd Cossack Horse Artillery Regiment
- Plastun Brigade (basis for the unfinished 3rd Cossack Plastun Division)
  - 7th Plastun Regiment
  - 8th Plastun Regiment
  - Reconnaissance Section
- 11th Luftwaffe Field Division

The regiments of the corps each had a patch with two main colors, a black border, and Cyrillic letters that represented each Cossack host. The latter included ВД (Don Host), ПСВ (Regiment of the Siberian Host), КВ (Kuban Host), or ТВ (Terek Host).

== See also ==
- Collaboration during World War II
- Waffen-SS foreign volunteers and conscripts

== Books ==
- Beyda, Oleg; Petrov, Igor (2018). "The Soviet Union". In David Stahel (ed.). Joining Hitler's Crusade: European Nations and the Invasion of the Soviet Union, 1941. Cambridge: Cambridge University Press. pp. 369–428. ISBN 978-1-316-51034-6.
- Booker, Christopher (1997). A Looking-Glass Tragedy: The Controversy Over the Repatriations from Austria in 1945. London: Duckworth. ISBN 9780715627389.
- Littlejohn, David (1987). Foreign Legions of the Third Reich. Vol. 4. San Jose: R. James Bender Publishing. ISBN 0-912138-17-3.
- Mueggenberg, Brent (2019). The Cossack Struggle Against Communism, 1917-1945. Jefferson: McFarland. ISBN 978-1-4766-7948-8.
- Newland, Samuel J. (1991). Cossacks in the German Army, 1941-1945. London, England: Frank Cass. ISBN 0-7146-3351-8.
- Tessin, Georg (1977). "Die Waffengattungen – Gesamtübersicht" [The military branches – overview]. Verbände und Truppen der deutschen Wehrmacht und Waffen SS im Zweiten Weltkrieg 1939-1945 (in German). Vol. 1. Osnabrück: Biblio.
- Tessin, Georg (1966). "Die Landstreitkräfte 1-5" [Ground forces 1 to 5]. Verbände und Truppen der deutschen Wehrmacht und Waffen SS im Zweiten Weltkrieg 1939-1945: (in German). Vol. 2. Frankfurt am Main: Mittler.
- Tessin, Georg (1970). "Die Landstreitkräfte 15–30" [Ground forces 15 to 30]. Verbände und Truppen der deutschen Wehrmacht und Waffen-SS 1939-1945 (in German). Vol. 4. Osnabrück: Biblio.
- Werth, Nicholas (1999). The Black Book of Communism: Crimes, Terror, Repression. Harvard University Press. ISBN 0-674-07608-7.
- Zemskov, Viktor (2011). "К вопросу о судьбе советских репатриантов в СССР (1944-1955)" [On the Question of the Fate of Soviet Repatriates in the USSR (1944-1955)]. Политическое просвещение (Politpros.com) (in Russian).
