= Army Group E =

- German: Heeresgruppe E
- Active: 1 January 1943 – 8 May 1945
- Disbanded: 8 May 1945
- Country: Nazi Germany
- Branch: Heer ( Wehrmacht)
- Type: Army group

Commanders
- Commander: Alexander Löhr

Army Group E (German: Heeresgruppe E) was a German Army Group active during World War II.

Army Group E was created on 1 January 1943 from the 12th Army. Units from this Army Group were distributed throughout the Eastern Mediterranean area, including Albania, Greece, the Territory of the Military Commander in Serbia, and the Independent State of Croatia.

== Composition ==
Its principal units were:

- 11th Luftwaffe Field Division (Attica garrison) - Generalleutnant Wilhelm Kohler
- Rhodes Assault Division (amalgamated with the Brandenburg Panzergrenadier Division in 1944)
- LXVIII Army Corps (eastern Greece and Peloponnese)
  - 117th Jäger Division - General der Gebirgstruppe Karl von Le Suire
  - 1st Panzer Division (June–October 1943) - Generalmajor Walter Krüger
- XXII Mountain Army Corps (western Greece) - General der Gebirgstruppe Hubert Lanz
  - 104th Jäger Division - General der Infanterie Hartwig von Ludwiger
  - 1st Mountain Division - Generalleutnant Walter Stettner
- 41st Fortress Division
- Fortress Crete
  - 22nd Division - General der Infanterie Friedrich-Wilhelm Müller
- Also within the Army Group command were 22 penal "fortress battalions" of the "999" series.

== Service history ==
The Army Group participated in anti-partisan operations in Greece and Yugoslavia. During the course of these operations, several atrocities were committed, including the massacres of Kalavryta and Distomo in Greece. Furthermore, during the disarmament of the Italian army in September 1943, German troops executed over 5,000 Italian prisoners of war in the Cephallonia Massacre. At the same time, the Army Group successfully repelled the British attempt to seize the Italian-occupied Dodecanese Islands. Army Group troops were also involved in the Chortiatis massacre (September 1944).

=== Retreat from Greece ===
When the fighting in Romania developed into a German defeat in the summer of 1944, Army Group E began to withdraw from the Greek islands and mainland. The withdrawal from the southern Balkans was successful. In the autumn of 1944, 2nd and 3rd Ukrainian Fronts, together with the People's Liberation Army of Yugoslavia (Partisans), conquered central Serbia as part of the Belgrade Operation. (The Soviet troops were then redeployed to Hungary.) This forced Army Group E and 2nd Panzer Army to set off through the very mountainous terrain of southwestern Serbia, northern Montenegro and finally southeast Bosnia, towards Croatia. Throughout this journey, the Germans were attacked by the Partisans, with some British assistance (Operation Floxo). On the Bosnian border, Army Group E was able to establish a stable defensive position.

Army Group E was joined with what was left of Army Group F, which had been dissolved on 25 March 1945. In the spring of 1945, some troops were sent to Hungary, with some units moving to Austria and southern Germany. During the 1945 retreat the fortress units were amalgamated into the LXXXXI Army Corps.

=== Last fight in Croatia ===
Colonel General Alexander Löhr tried to hold the Independent State of Croatia against the People's Liberation Army. A major offensive by the People's Liberation Army, which began on 12 April 1945, drove the German troops together in the Slovenian-Austrian border area. A few units escaped and eventually surrendered to British forces that had occupied Styria and Carinthia. Alexander Löhr reached a partial agreement with the British Commander-in-Chief to accept the German units.

On 30 April 1945, Army Group E contained the LXIX Command (StuG Brigade South East), XV SS Cossacks (2nd Cossacks, 1st Cossacks, 11th LFD), XXI Mountain Corps (22nd Volksgrenadiers, 369th Croatian, 7th SS, 181st, 41st), XV Mountain Corps (373rd Croatian, 639th Security Regiment), LXXXXI Command (104th Jägers, 20th Jäger Regiment) and LXXXXVII Command (237th, 188th Mountain, remains of 392nd Croatian).

On the day of the surrender, 8 May 1945, the mass of the Army group was still three day marches away from the Austrian border. Until 15 May, numerous units managed to escape to Austria. 150,000 German soldiers of the Army group were captured by Tito's forces. At that time, Army Group E consisted of seven German divisions, two Cossack divisions of the XV SS Cossack Cavalry Corps and nine Croatian divisions. 220,000 members of the Croatian forces who fled to Austria with Army Group E were extradited by the British to the Tito partisans after their surrender. Several thousand of them were subsequently killed in the Bleiburg Massacre.

A member of Army Group E who later rose to prominence was Austrian president and United Nations Secretary-General Kurt Waldheim, who served in the military administration of Thessaloniki.

== Commanders ==
No.	Portrait	Commander	Took office	Left office	Time in office	Ref.
1	Alexander Löhr	Generaloberst; Alexander Löhr (1885–1947)	31 December 1942	8 May 1945	2 years, 127 days	

== Sources ==
- Hogg, Ian V., German Order of Battle 1944: The regiments, formations and units of the German ground forces, Arms and Armour Press, London, 1975
- Tessin, Georg (1980). Die Landstreitkräfte: Namensverbände / Die Luftstreitkräfte (Fliegende Verbände) / Flakeinsatz im Reich 1943–1945 [Ground forces: Named units and formations / Air forces (Flying units and formations) / Anti–aircraft service in the Reich 1943–1945]. Verbände und Truppen der deutschen Wehrmacht und Waffen–SS im Zweiten Weltkrieg 1939–1945 (in German). Vol. 14. Osnabrück: Biblio. ISBN 3-7648-1111-0.
- Thomas, Nigel, (Author), Andrew, Stephen, (Illustrator), The German Army 1939-45 (2) : North Africa & Balkans (Men-At-Arms Series, 316), Osprey Publishing, 1998 ISBN 978-1-85532-640-8
