= Army Group F =

- German: Heeresgruppe F
- Active: 12 August 1943 – 25 March 1945
- Country: Nazi Germany
- Branch: Heer ( Wehrmacht)
- Type: Army group

Commanders
- Commander: Maximilian von Weichs

Army Group F (German: Heeresgruppe F) was a strategic command formation of the Wehrmacht during the Second World War. The commander of Army Group F served also as the Oberbefehlshaber Südost (Commander-in-Chief in the Southeast).

Created 12 August 1943, at Bayreuth (WK XIII), it was primarily stationed in the Balkans. Its commander from August 1943 was Generalfeldmarschall Maximilian von Weichs with Lieutenant General Hermann Foertsch serving as the Chief of Staff. Its primary participation in combat was in defending against possible Allied invasion in what was seen as Germany's "weak underbelly", and fighting off local partisan groups that were gaining strength. In late 1944, it oversaw the German retreat from Greece and most of Yugoslavia in the wake of the Budapest Offensive.

The Army Group included for much of the war the 2nd Panzer Army in Yugoslavia and Albania, and the Army Group E in Greece.

== Order of Battle November 1943 ==
- 2nd Panzer Army
  - Army Staff units
  - III SS Panzer Corps, SS-Obergruppenführer Felix Steiner
  - XV Mountain Corps, General of Infantry Ernst von Leyser
  - XXI Mountain Corps, General of Panzer troops Gustav Fehn
  - LXIX Corps, z.b.V. General of Infantry Helge Auleb
  - V SS Mountain Corps, General Lieutenant Artur Phleps
- Army Group E
  - Army Group Staff units
  - XXII Mountain Corps, General of Mountain troops Hubert Lanz
  - LXVIII Army Corps, General of Aviation Hellmuth Felmy
  - Troops of the commander of the fortress Crete
  - Bulgarian II (Aegean) Corps
- Troops of the Militärbefehlshaber Südost General of Infantry Hans Felber

== Order of Battle July 1944 ==
The subordinate units of the Army Group were predominantly the less capable "fortress" and reserve divisions, collaborationist foreign volunteer units such as the "Cossacks" and 392nd (Croatian) Infantry Division.

- 2nd Panzer Army
  - Army Staff units
  - XV Mountain Corps, General of Infantry Ernst von Leyser
  - XXI Mountain Corps, General of Panzer troops Gustav Fehn
  - LXIX Corps z.b.V., General of Infantry Helge Auleb
  - V SS Mountain Corps, Lieutenant General Arthur Phleps
  - XV SS Cossack Cavalry Corps (from September 1944), Lieutenant General and SS-Gruppenführer Helmuth von Pannwitz
- Army Group E
  - Army Group Staff units
  - XXII Mountain Corps, General of Mountain troops Hubert Lanz
  - LXVIII Army Corps, General of Aviation Hellmuth Felmy
  - Troops of the commander of the fortress Crete
  - Bulgarian II (Aegean) Corps
- Troops of the Militärbefehlshaber Südost, General of Infantry Hans Felber

For the defence of Serbia, the Commander of Army Group F assembled Army Group Serbia on 26 September 1944. Army Detachment Serbia (German: Armee-Abteilung Serbien) commanded by General Hans Felber. Army Group Serbia was disbanded on 27 October 1944.

Army Group F was disbanded 25 March 1945.

== Commanders ==
| No. | Portrait | Commander | Took office | Left office | Time in office |
|---|---|---|---|---|---|
| 1 | Maximilian von Weichs | Generalfeldmarschall; Maximilian von Weichs (1881–1954) | 26 August 1943 | 25 March 1945 | 1 year, 211 days |

== See also ==
- World War II in Yugoslavia

== Sources ==
- Hogg, Ian V., German Order of Battle 1944: The regiments, formations and units of the German ground forces, Arms and Armour Press, London, 1975
- Thomas, Nigel, (Author), Andrew, Stephen, (Illustrator), The German Army 1939-45 (4): Eastern Front 1943-45 (Men-at-Arms 330), Osprey Publishing, 1998 ISBN 978-1-85532-796-2
- Mitcham, Samuel W., Jr., German Defeat in the East, 1944-45 (Stackpole Military History), 2007 ISBN 978-0-8117-3371-7
- Tessin, Georg (1980). Die Landstreitkräfte: Namensverbände / Die Luftstreitkräfte (Fliegende Verbände) / Flakeinsatz im Reich 1943–1945 [Ground forces: Named units and formations / Air forces (Flying units and formations) / Anti–aircraft service in the Reich 1943–1945] (in German). Vol. 14. Osnabrück: Biblio. ISBN 3-7648-1111-0.
- Heeresgruppe F - Lexikon des Wehrmacht (in German)
- National archive Washington documents:
  - T311, Roll 187 - Heeresgruppe F 1943/1944.
  - T311, Roll 188 - Heeresgruppe F 1944.
  - T311, Roll 189 - Heeresgruppe F 1944/1945.
  - T311, Roll 190 - Heeresgruppe F 1944/1945.
  - T311, Roll 194 - Heeresgruppe F 1944.
  - T311, Roll 195 - Heeresgruppe F 1944.
  - T311, Roll 196 - Heeresgruppe F 1944/1945.
  - T311, Roll 285 - Heeresgruppe F 1943/1944.
  - T311, Roll 286 - Heeresgruppe F 1944.
