= Bodzanowice =

- Village
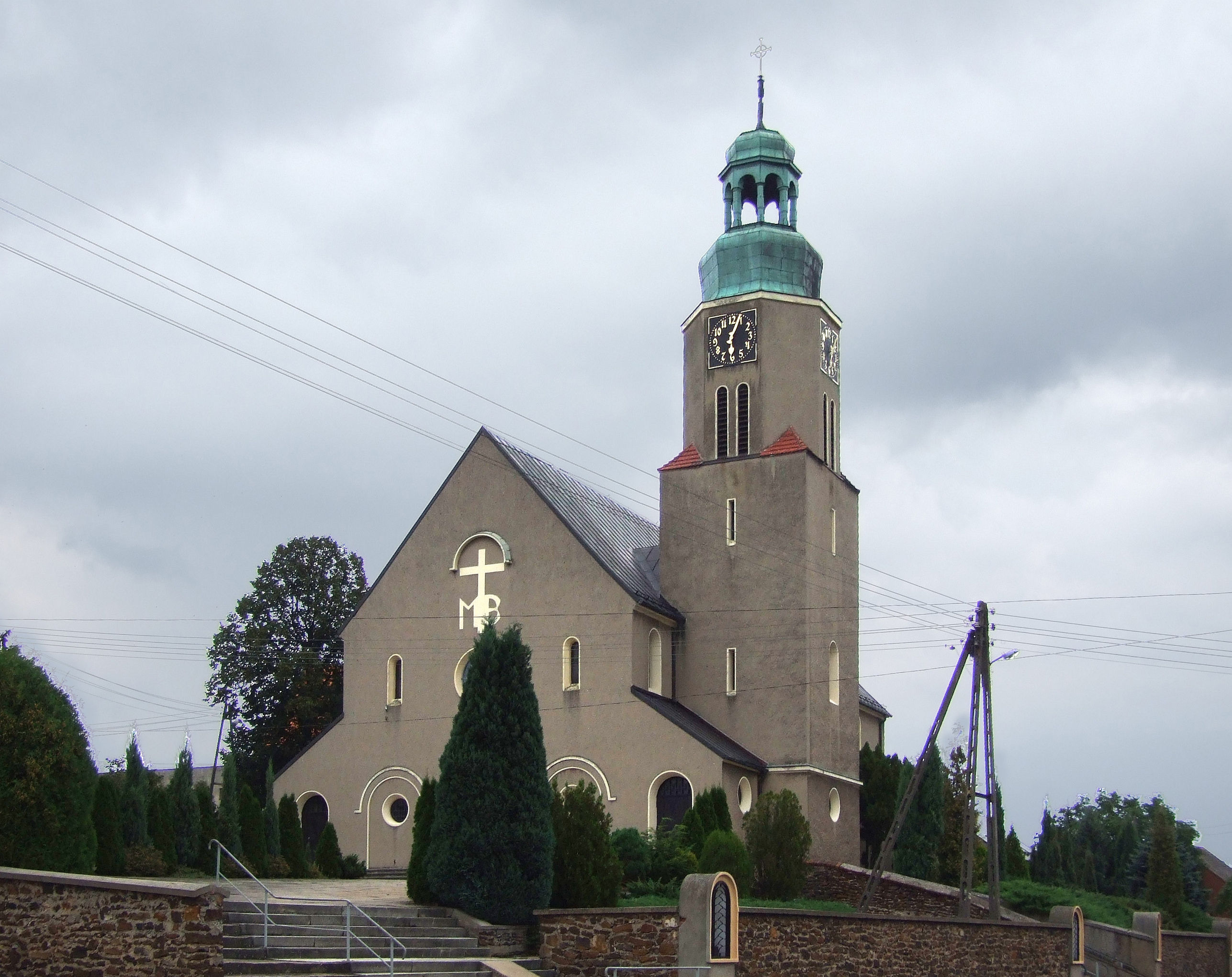
- Church of the Nativity of the Virgin Mary

- Location within Poland
- Coordinates: 50°54′24″N 18°37′23″E
- Country: Poland
- Voivodeship: Opole
- County: Olesno
- Gmina: Gmina Olesno

Population
  - Total: 1,080
- Website: http://www.bodzanowice.olesno.pl

Bodzanowice [bɔd͡zanɔˈvit͡sɛ] (German: Botzanowitz) is a village in the administrative district of Gmina Olesno, within Olesno County, Opole Voivodeship, in south-western Poland.

== Notable residents ==
- Helmuth von Pannwitz (1898-1947) Wehrmacht general and SS Cossack Cavalry Corps officer executed alongside his Cossack soldiers for fighting against the Soviet Union. When Pannwitz was given the option to return to his home country, he refused and chose to stay with his men whom he died with.
- Jan Wieczorek (1935-2023), Polish Roman Catholic bishop
