= 2nd SS Cossack Cavalry Division =

2nd Cossack Cavalry Division
- German: 2. Kosaken-Kavallerie-Division
- Active: November 1944 – May 1945
- Country: Nazi Germany
- Branch: Waffen-SS
- Type: Cavalry
- Size: Division
- Part of: XV SS Cossack Cavalry Corps

Commanders
- Commander: Hans-Joachim von Schultz

The 2nd Cossack Cavalry Division (German: 2. Kosaken-Kavallerie-Division) was a short-lived cavalry division of Nazi Germany's Waffen-SS during World War II. The division existed from November 1944 until May 1945. It was one of two Waffen-SS Cossack collaborationist divisions, along with the 1st Cossack Cavalry Division. After surrender to the British forces, the division's personnel were forcibly repatriated to the Soviet Union.

== History ==
=== Background and formation ===
The Wehrmacht had aimed to integrate Cossack collaborators into its own armed forces as early as late 1941, and hoped to utilize their abilities on horseback for the war effort on the Eastern Front. Cossack cavalry was historically renowned for its value in anti-partisan warfare, and although Adolf Hitler initially officially prohibited the recruitment of locals, the necessity of warfare soon led to the autonomous creation by German commanders of ad-hoc volunteer units to assist in local German forces' rear areas. On 13 November 1942, a staff with the name "Horse Formation von Pannwitz" (Reiterverband von Pannwitz) was formed to prepare the imminent assembly of Cossack cavalry regiments. This cavalry formation was named after Helmuth von Pannwitz, one of the leading advocates inside Wehrmacht and Waffen-SS for the establishment of local cavalry formations, who would later go on to command the XV SS Corps that the eventual 2nd Cossack Cavalry Division would be a part of. The division's personnel was recruited from among Germany's numerous prisoners of war. Two such Cossack regiments, the "Cavalry Regiment Count von Urach" (Kavallerie-Regiment Fürst von Urach) and "Cavalry Regiment Platov" (Kavallerie-Regiment Platow), were formed as the nucleus of a total of six Cossack regiments which were assigned their designations on 5 September 1943, with each of the six regiments receiving the identity of a certain Cossack host (Don, Sibir, Zaporozhia, Kuban, Don, Terek). The Cossacks were used in Yugoslavia, participating in Operation Rösselsprung. Although each regiment carried the name of a host, troop transfers between the regiments were still conducted, thus leaving none of the regiments completely bound to their certain identity. The six regiments were formed into the 1st Cossack Cavalry Division on 4 August 1943. The Cossack cavalry was earmarked for transfer to the Waffen-SS in late 1944, where they were to be reorganized into two separate divisions, thus requiring the assembly of a second division. The reassignment to the Waffen-SS remained nominal; most of the Cossacks continued to fight in Wehrmacht uniforms, with Wehrmacht rank designations.

Using the former "2nd Cossack Cavalry Brigade" (2. Kosaken-Kavallerie-Brigade) of the German army, the 2nd Cossack Cavalry Division was formed in November 1944. It initially consisted of the Kuban Cossack Horse Regiment 3, Don Cossack Horse Regiment 5 and Terek Cossack Horse Regiment 6, as well as Division Units 2 for divisional support.

=== Operations ===
After a lengthy assembly process supervised by SS Führungshauptamt in the Independent State of Croatia between November 1944 and March 1945, in whose reserve the division remained during formation, the division was attached to the XV SS Cossack Cavalry Corps and assigned to Army Group E, serving in German-occupied Yugoslavia. The division's sole commander was Hans-Joachim von Schultz. Other divisions in the XV SS Cossack Cavalry Corps were the 1st Cossack Cavalry Division, 11th Luftwaffe Field Division and 22nd Volksgrenadier Division.

In May 1945, the personnel of the 2nd Cossack Cavalry Division surrendered to the British Eighth Army and were subsequently handed over to the Soviet Union, where they were punished as traitors. The repatriation of Soviet nationals had previously been agreed between the Western Allies and the Soviet Union, and went against the wills of most of the repatriated collaborators. Many of the leaders were subsequently executed.

== Sources ==
=== Literature ===
- Fowler, Jeffrey (2001). Axis Cavalry in World War II. Osprey Men-at-Arms. Vol. 361. Oxford: Osprey Publishing. ISBN 1841763233.
