= Franz Riedweg =

Franz Egbert Riedweg (10 April 1907, in Lucerne – 22 January 2005, in Munich) was a Swiss far-right activist in the National Front (Switzerland) who, during World War II, served in the Waffen-SS as well as becoming a close associate of Heinrich Himmler.

Riedweg himself spent most of the war in Germany. He was taken prisoner by the Americans on 3 May 1945. He was released after making false statements, but rearrested by the British, and was interned until 1948. In December 1947, Riedweg was sentenced in absentia by the Swiss Federal Criminal Court to 16 years in prison for treason, albeit the government never sought his extradition, partly due to the influence of certain Swiss politicians and civil servants, such as Heinrich Walther. Riedwig later became active in HIAG, a lobbyist group for Waffen-SS veterans.
