= 7.5 cm FK 38 =

7.5 cm Feldkanone 38
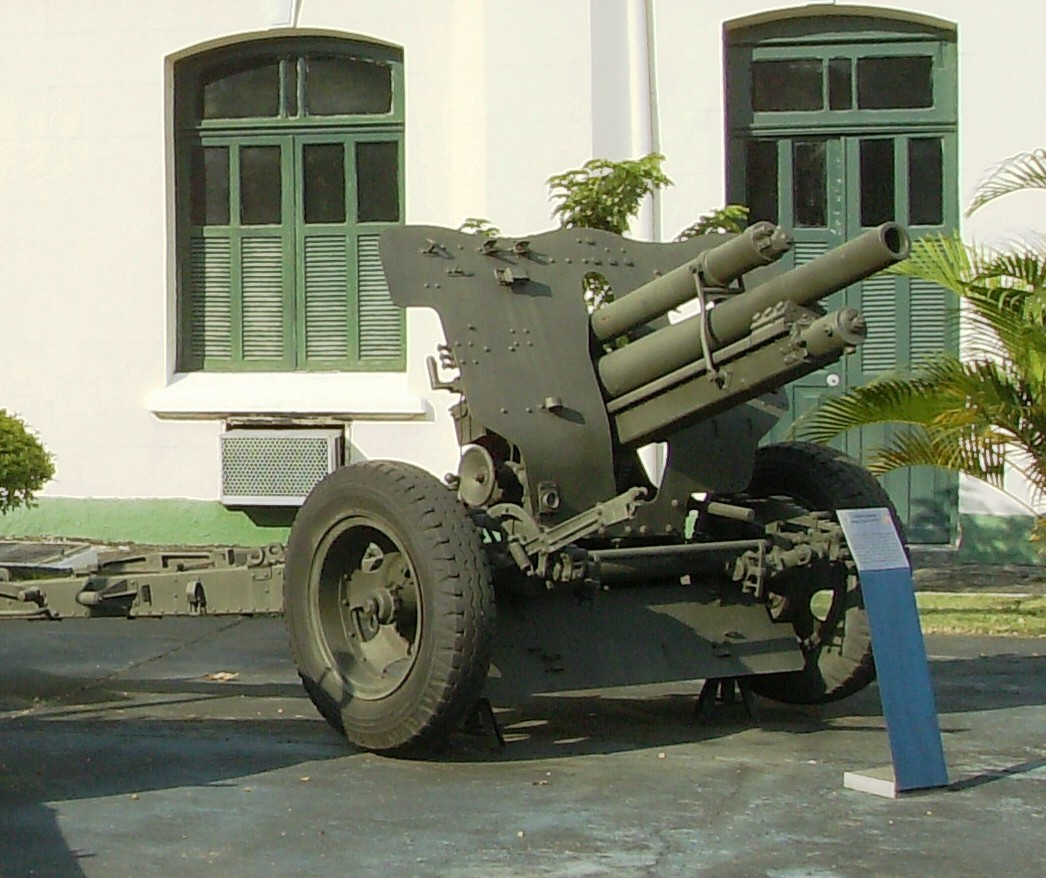
- Type: Field gun
- Place of origin: Germany

Service history
- In service: 1939–45
- Used by: Nazi Germany; Brazil
- Wars: World War II

Production history
- Manufacturer: Krupp
- Produced: 1939–42
- No. built: 144

Specifications
- Mass: 1,366 kg (3,011 lbs)
- Barrel length: 2.55 m (8 ft 4 in) L/34
- Shell: Fixed QF 75 x 397mm R
- Shell weight: 5.85 kg (12.9 lb) (HE); 6.3 kg (14 lb) (AP)
- Caliber: 75 mm (2.95 in)
- Breech: semi-automatic horizontal sliding-block
- Carriage: split trail
- Elevation: -5° to +45°
- Traverse: 50°
- Rate of fire: 8–10 rpm
- Muzzle velocity: 605 m/s (1,985 ft/s)
- Maximum firing range: 11,500 m (12,576 yds)
- Filling: TNT
- Filling weight: 1.06 kilograms (2.3 lb)

The 7.5 cm Feldkanone 38 (7.5 cm FK 38) was a field gun used by Germany and Brazil in World War II. Built by Krupp to satisfy an order by the Brazilian Army, some 64 were delivered before the war began. In 1942, the remainder of the order was completed and 80 were delivered to the Heer.

== Design ==
The FK 38 had a longer barrel than the 7.5 cm FK 18 and was fitted with a cylindrical muzzle brake. Originally, this was an unusual six slot design, but it was later replaced by a standard German four port design. Early versions had wood-spoked wheels, but later models had pressed steel wheels with solid rubber tires and had sprung axles for motor transport. It used a semi-automatic version of the original breech mechanism and fixed ammunition instead of the original separate-loading rounds. These changes likely boosted its rate of fire over the FK 18 considerably.
