= Helmuth von Pannwitz =

German SS general (1898–1947)

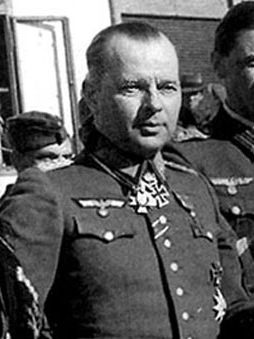
- Pannwitz in 1943
- Born: 14 October 1898; Botzanowitz Estate, Rosenberg District, Province of Silesia, Kingdom of Prussia, German Empire
- Died: 16 January 1947 (aged 48); Lefortovo Prison, Moscow, Soviet Union
- Cause of death: Execution by hanging
- Military career
- Allegiance: German Empire; Weimar Republic; Nazi Germany
- Branch: Imperial German Army; Freikorps; Reichsheer; Sturmabteilung; German Army; Schutzstaffel
- Service years: 1914–1918; 1919/1921–1922; 1919–1920; 1933–1935; 1935–1945; 1945
- Rank: 2nd Lieutenant; SA-Sturmführer; Generalleutnant; Feldataman; SS-Gruppenführer
- Commands: XV SS Cossack Cavalry Corps
- Conflicts: World War I; Silesian Uprisings; World War II
- Awards: Knight's Cross of the Iron Cross with Oak Leaves; Iron Cross (1914) 1st Class
- Other work: Farmer

Helmuth von Pannwitz (14 October 1898 – 16 January 1947) was a German general who was a cavalry officer during the First and the Second World Wars. Later he became a lieutenant general of the Wehrmacht, a SS-Gruppenführer of the Waffen-SS, and Feldataman of the XV SS Cossack Cavalry Corps. In 1947 he was tried for war crimes under Ukaz 43 by the Military Collegium of the Supreme Court of the Soviet Union, sentenced to death on 16 January 1947 and executed in Lefortovo Prison the same day. He was rehabilitated by a military prosecutor in Moscow in April 1996. In June 2001, however, the reversal of the conviction of Pannwitz was overturned and his conviction was reinstated.

== Early life and interwar period ==
Lieutenant Colonel Helmut von Pannwitz, 21 September 1941

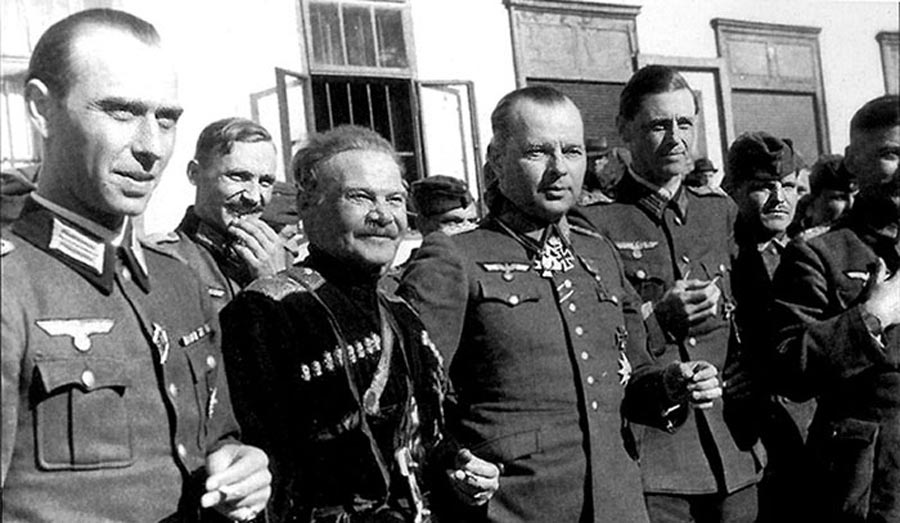
Cossack generals Andrei Shkuro and Helmut von Pannwitz, 1943

Pannwitz was born into a family of Prussian nobility on his father's estate Botzanowitz (today Bodzanowice), Silesia, near Rosenberg (today Olesno), now part of Poland but directly on the German-Russian border of that time. His family was originally from the village of Pannwitz in Lusatia. From the 14th to 16th century the family held the office of Burggraf of Glatz.

Aged twelve, he entered the Prussian cadet school in Wahlstatt, near Liegnitz in Silesia, and later the main cadet school at Lichterfelde. Even before outbreak of World War I he was attracted by exhibitions of Cossack units that were organized in the neighboring towns of the Russian Empire. As an officer cadet, Pannwitz upon the outbreak of the First World War joined the Imperial German Army as a volunteer (1st Regiment of Lancers, based at Militsch), in the course of which he was at the age of sixteen promoted to the rank of Leutnant (second lieutenant/cornet) and decorated with the Iron Cross Second Class in the same year (and, a year later, the First Class) for bravery in action.

Immediately after the war he fought in the ranks of the Volunteer Corps (Freikorps) against Polish separatists in Silesia and participated in the Kapp Putsch. Wanted as a suspect in the murder of a Social-Democrat, Bernhard Schottländer, in Breslau, he fled to Poland. Under an assumed name, he became a leader in the Black Reichswehr in 1923 where he was involved in a number of Feme murders. In the aftermath of the failed Küstrin Putsch, Pannwitz fled again to Poland. Pannwitz went to Poland in 1926, where he lived and worked as a farm administrator in Młochów, near Warsaw.

When an amnesty was granted in 1931, Pannwitz returned to Germany. He became a Stabsführer of the SA in Silesia. In 1934 he commanded an SA cavalry squadron. By cooperating with the Gestapo he played a leading role during the Röhm purge in Silesia. For that he was admitted to join the Nazi Party. In 1935 he rejoined the German Army as a Rittmeister (captain) and cavalry squadron commander in the 2nd Cavalry Regiment in Angerburg, East Prussia. In 1938, following the Anschluss when Austria became part of Germany, he was transferred to Austria and became detachment commander with the 11th Cavalry Regiment at Stockerau near Vienna, being promoted to the rank of Major at the same time. World War II found him as the commander of the reconnaissance detachment of the 45th Infantry Division in Poland and France.

== World War II ==
On active service again in World War II, Pannwitz was awarded "bars" to his previous decorations and in September 1941 was awarded the Knight's Cross of the Iron Cross. He received the Oak Leaves as an Oberst (colonel) a year later for successful military leadership, when he was in command of a battle group covering the southern flank in the battle of Stalingrad.

Pannwitz was instrumental in establishing a collaborationist Cossack force, the Cossack Cavalry Brigade, which was formed on 21 April 1943 and soon merged into 1st Cossack Cavalry Division under his command. The unit conducted rear-area punitive operations in Ukraine and Belarus, and was then moved to fight against Yugoslav partisans. In Croatia and Serbia, the division quickly established a reputation for undisciplined and ruthless behavior, not only towards the partisans but also the civilian population, prompting Croatian authorities to complain to the Germans and finally to Adolf Hitler himself. Besides raping women, killing people and plundering and burning towns suspected of harboring partisans and their supporters, the division used telegraph poles along the railroad tracks for mass hangings as a warning to the partisans and others. Although the behavior of the Cossacks was not as ruthless as portrayed by Partisan propaganda, nevertheless during its first two months of deployment in Croatia, special divisional courts-martial imposed at least 20 death sentences in each of the four regiments for related crimes.

During the summer of 1944, the two brigades were upgraded to become the 1st Cossack Division and 2nd Cossack Cavalry Division. On 25 February 1945 these divisions were combined to become XV SS Cossack Cavalry Corps. Due to the respect he showed for his troops and his tendency to attend Russian Orthodox services with them, Pannwitz was very popular with his Cossack troops. Before the end of the war, he was elected Feldataman (German rendering of Supreme Ataman, the highest rank in the Cossack hierarchy and one that was traditionally reserved for the Tsar alone).

By the end of the war, the SS took control of all foreign units within the German forces. The Himmler file in the Imperial War Museum contains a record of a conversation which occurred on 26 August 1944 between Himmler, Pannwitz, and Pannwitz's chief of staff, Colonel H.-J. von Schultz. An agreement was reached that the Cossack division, soon to be the Cossack Corps, was placed under SS administration in terms of replacements and supplies. Both the German cadre and the Cossack troops were to retain their uniforms and their Wehrmacht or Cossack ranks. For the moment, Pannwitz refused to enter the SS, arguing: “I have been in the army since I was fifteen. To leave it now would seem to me like desertion.” Himmler sought to place all Cossack fighting units under Pannwitz's command. Thus, in November 1944, most units were transferred to the Waffen-SS and integrated into the newly formed XV SS Cossack Cavalry Corps. By his own request Pannwitz was discharged from the army on 10 February 1945 and entered the SS in the rank of SS-Gruppenführer and lieutenant-general of the Waffen-SS the following day.

== Surrender, trial, and execution ==
Towards the end of the war, the Cossack leadership expected the alliance between the Western Powers and the Soviet Union would collapse the moment Berlin fell, same as it did after World War I. In March 1945, Pannwitz sent a delegation to General Andrey Vlasov, commander of the collaborationist Russian Liberation Army. He thought that transferring his corps to Vlasov's Committee for the Liberation of the Peoples of Russia (KONR) would shield it from the stigma of being associated with the SS. Pannwitz hoped that this would make any alliance more palatable to the Western Allies. The formal transfer to KONR took place in late April, but had no practical effect as the war ended days later.

The XV SS Cossack Cavalry Corps surrendered on 11–12 May 1945, after retreating out of Yugoslavia and establishing contact with British troops near Völkermarkt, Austria. Pannwitz sought to set conditions so that his force would not be handed over to the Red Army, but his British interlocutor would have none of that. He demanded an unconditional surrender as were the terms for all German units. The 2nd SS Cossack Cavalry Division, which was covering the retreat of the 1st Division, was badly mauled in the fighting with Yugoslav Partisans but refused to surrender to them. Its final elements arrived in Austria on 15 May.

Initially, British troops did not guard the 18,000 to 20,000 combatants of the XV SS Cossack Cavalry Corps, just told them to stay within certain boundaries. On 15 May, British officers informed the senior commanders that the corps would likely be repatriated to the Soviet Union. Many German officers took the opportunity to desert; Pannwitz and the remainder of his staff chose to stay behind. On 26 May, British soldiers arrested Pannwitz and his staff and placed them under guard. The next day, the British military moved the rest of the corps to a high-security camp at Weitensfeld to prepare for the transfers. Officers hid the ultimate destination from the Cossacks, so the soldiers boarded the Weitensfeld-bound trucks without resistance. Over the next few days, British transports delivered the men, including Pannwitz, to Judenburg and handed them over to the Red Army.

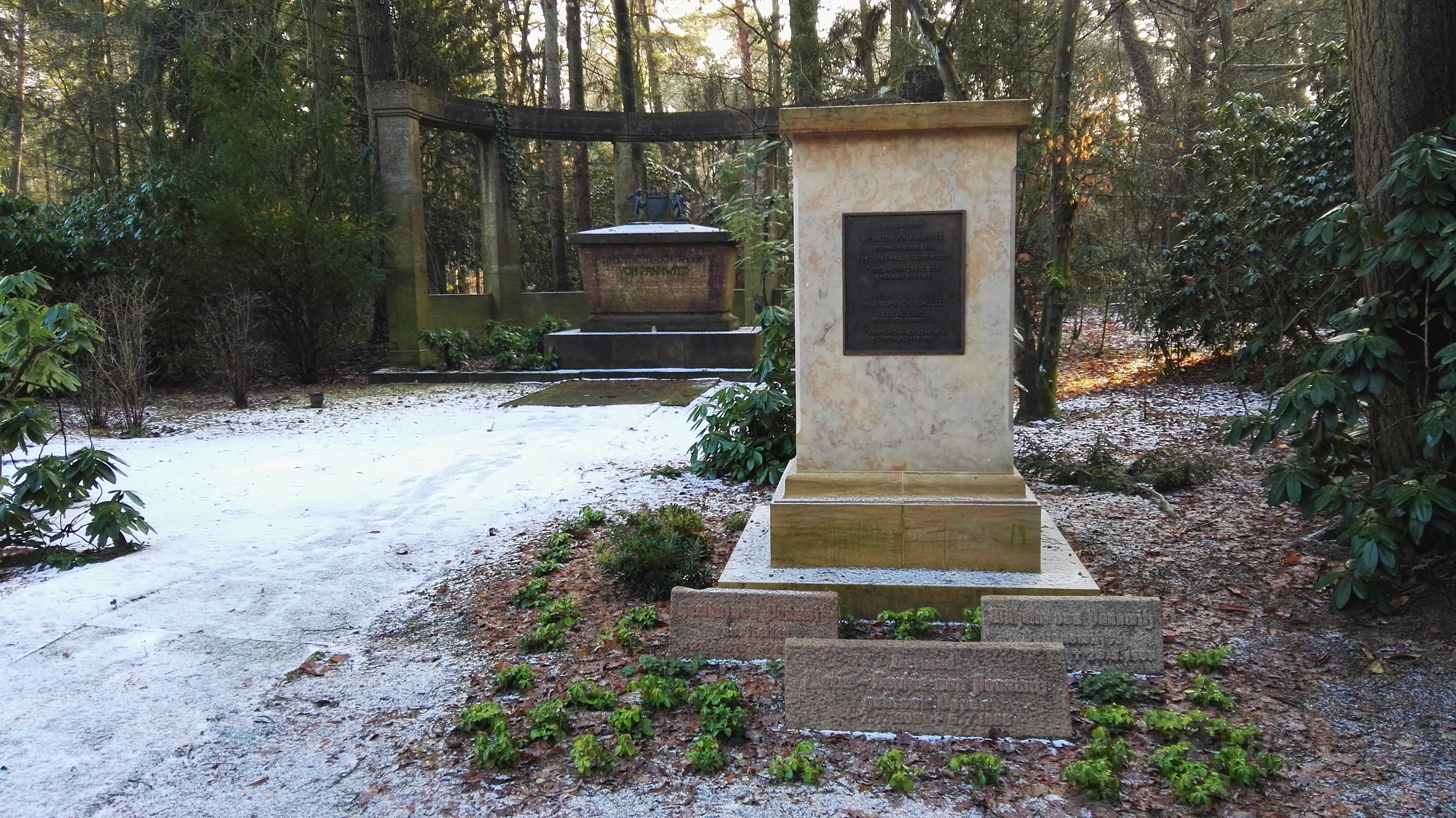
Grave of Helmuth von Pannwitz near Stahnsdorf, Germany

Following their delivery into Soviet custody, SMERSH segregated the senior Cossack leadership, including Pannwitz, and transported them to Moscow's Lubyanka and Lefortovo prisons. The six defendants were charged with war crimes, collaboration, high treason, and espionage against the Soviet state under Ukaz 39 and Article 58 of the Soviet penal code. The Military Collegium of the Supreme Court of the USSR conducted the closed trial on January 15–16, 1947. Judges found the defendants guilty and sentenced them to death. The sentence was final. The prisoners were hanged together in the courtyard of Lefortovo Prison on the evening of January 16, 1947.

== Attempted rehabilitation ==
Almost fifty years later, on 23 April 1996, during the Russian presidency of Boris Yeltsin, members of the Pannwitz family petitioned for a posthumous reversal of the 1946 conviction. The Military High Prosecutor in Moscow subsequently determined that Pannwitz was eligible for rehabilitation as a victim of Stalin-era repression. On 28 June 2001, however, rehabilitation was reversed in a ruling that disputed jurisdiction of the 1996 proceedings, and Pannwitz's conviction for military crimes was reinstated.

== Commemoration ==
In the town of Tristach, Austria, there was a memorial commemorating Pannwitz and the troops of the XV SS Cossack Cavalry Corps who were killed in action or died as POWs. This memorial was removed in September 2021 because of the connection between Pannwitz and both the SA and the SS, as well as his loyalty to the Nazi regime.

== Awards and decorations ==
- Iron Cross (1914)
  - 2nd Class (16 September 1915)
  - 1st Class (27 January 1917)
- Clasp to the Iron Cross (1939)
  - 2nd Class (23 September 1939)
  - 1st Class (5 October 1939)
- Knight's Cross of the Iron Cross with Oak Leaves
  - Knight's Cross (467th) on 4 September 1941 as Oberstleutnant and commander of Aufklärungs-Abteilung 45
  - 167th Oak Leaves on 23 December 1942 as Oberst and leader of the Kampfgruppe "von Pannwitz"

== See also ==
- Pyotr Krasnov
- Andrei Shkuro
- Repatriation of Cossacks after World War II
