= Asvestochori, Thessaloniki =

Asvestochori Ασβεστοχώρι
- Community
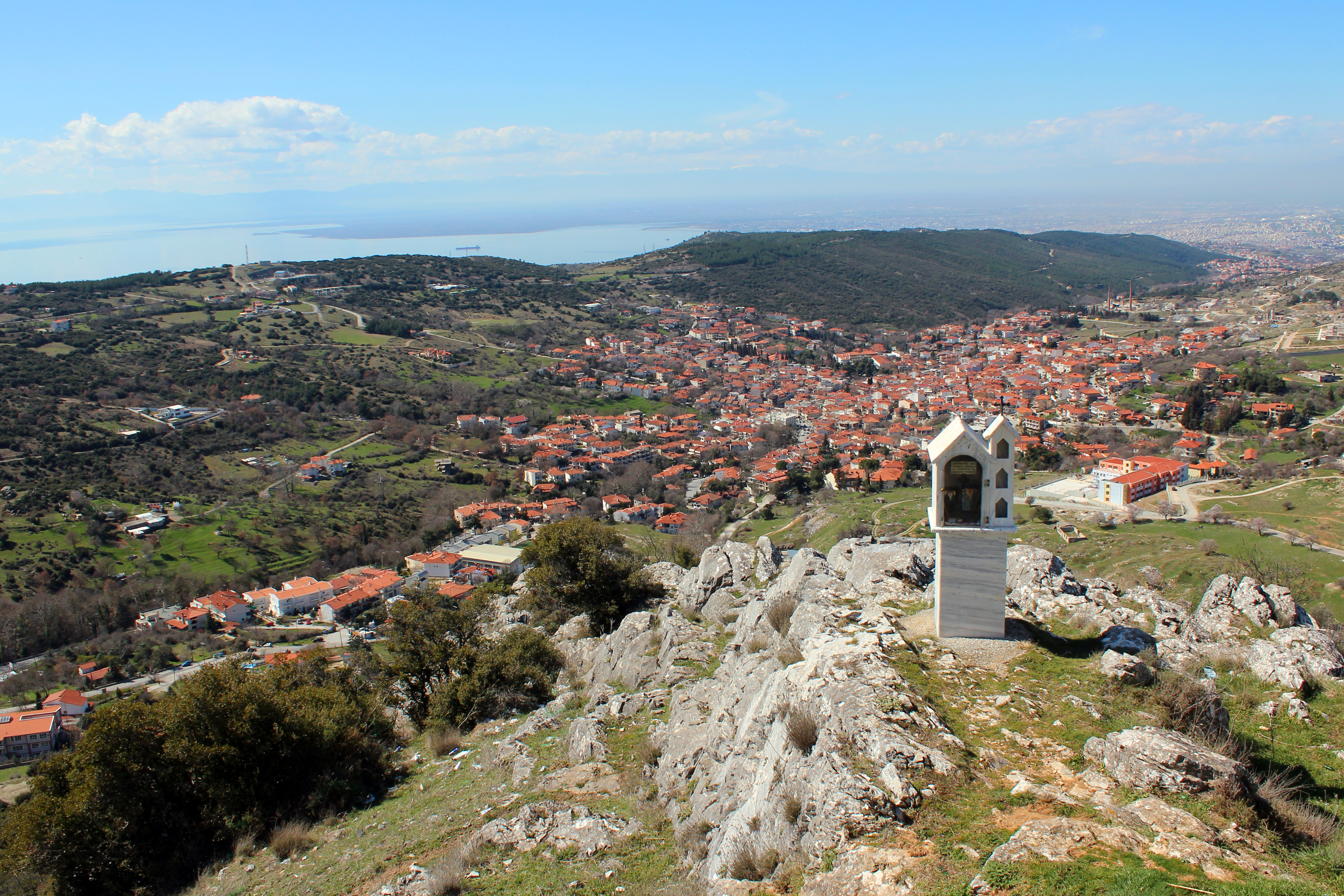

- Location within Greece
- Coordinates: 40°38.5′N 23°1.5′E
- Country: Greece
- Administrative region: Central Macedonia
- Regional unit: Thessaloniki
- Municipality: Pylaia-Chortiatis
- Municipal unit: Chortiatis

Area
  - Community: 34.344 km^{2} (13.260 sq mi)
- Elevation: 460 m (1,510 ft)

Population (2021)
  - Community: 6,551
  - Density: 190.7/km^{2} (494.0/sq mi)
- Time zone: UTC+2 (EET)
  - Summer (DST): UTC+3 (EEST)
- Postal code: 570 10
- Area code: +30-231
- Vehicle registration: NA to NX

Asvestochori (Greek: Ασβεστοχώρι) is a small town and a community of the Pylaia-Chortiatis municipality. Before the 2011 local government reform it was part of the municipality of Chortiatis, of which it was a municipal district. The 2021 census recorded 6,551 inhabitants in the community. The community of Asvestochori covers an area of 34.344 km^{2}.

Under the Turkish rule name of the town was called Kireç (lit. lime). It is reported that during the Population exchange between Greece and Turkey a guest house that can accommodate 5000 immigrants was built by Red Crescent in Kireç.

== See also ==
- List of settlements in the Thessaloniki regional unit
