= Ukaz 39 =

Decree of the Supreme Soviet of the USSR

Ukaz No. 39, also known as Ukaz 43 in some sources, was the 19 April 1943 ukaz (decree) of the Supreme Soviet of the USSR. Its full title was "On measures for the punishment of German-Fascist criminals who are guilty of killing or maltreating Soviet civilians and Red Army prisoners-of-war and for the punishment of spies and traitors to their fatherland among Soviet citizens and their helpers". The law was directed at the German, Romanian, Hungarian, and Finnish personnel guilty of war crimes, as well as Soviet citizens who collaborated with the enemy. Under the law, Soviet tribunals prosecuted members of the Wehrmacht, SS, SD, Order Police, and the Nazi civilian administration in the formerly occupied territories.

== See also ==
- Moscow Declarations
