= 1st SS Cossack Cavalry Division =

German cavalry division

1st Cossack Cavalry Division
- German: 1. Kosaken-Kavallerie-Division
- Divisional insignia
- Active: 1943–45
- Country: Nazi Germany
- Branch: Wehrmacht: German Army; Waffen-SS
- Type: Cavalry
- Role: Bandenbekämpfung; Maneuver warfare Raiding
- Size: 17,500 troops
- Part of: XV SS Cossack Cavalry Corps
- Engagements: World War II

Commanders
- Notable commanders: Helmuth von Pannwitz

Insignia
- Identification symbol

The 1st Cossack Cavalry Division (German: 1. Kosaken-Kavallerie-Division) was a Cossack division of the German Army that served during World War II. It was created mostly with Cossack collaborators already serving in the Wehrmacht (mostly former Soviet prisoner of war and those who escaped from the advancing Red Army) and Ostarbeiter (slave laborers). The division was deployed to the puppet Independent State of Croatia where it fought Yugoslav Partisans and became known for its atrocities against the civilian population.

In 1944, the division was transferred to the Waffen-SS, becoming part of the XV SS Cossack Cavalry Corps, established in February 1945. It was one of two Cossack cavalry divisions, the other being the 2nd Cossack Cavalry Division. After surrendering to the British forces in May 1945, the division's personnel was forcibly repatriated to the Soviet Union.

== Formation and training ==
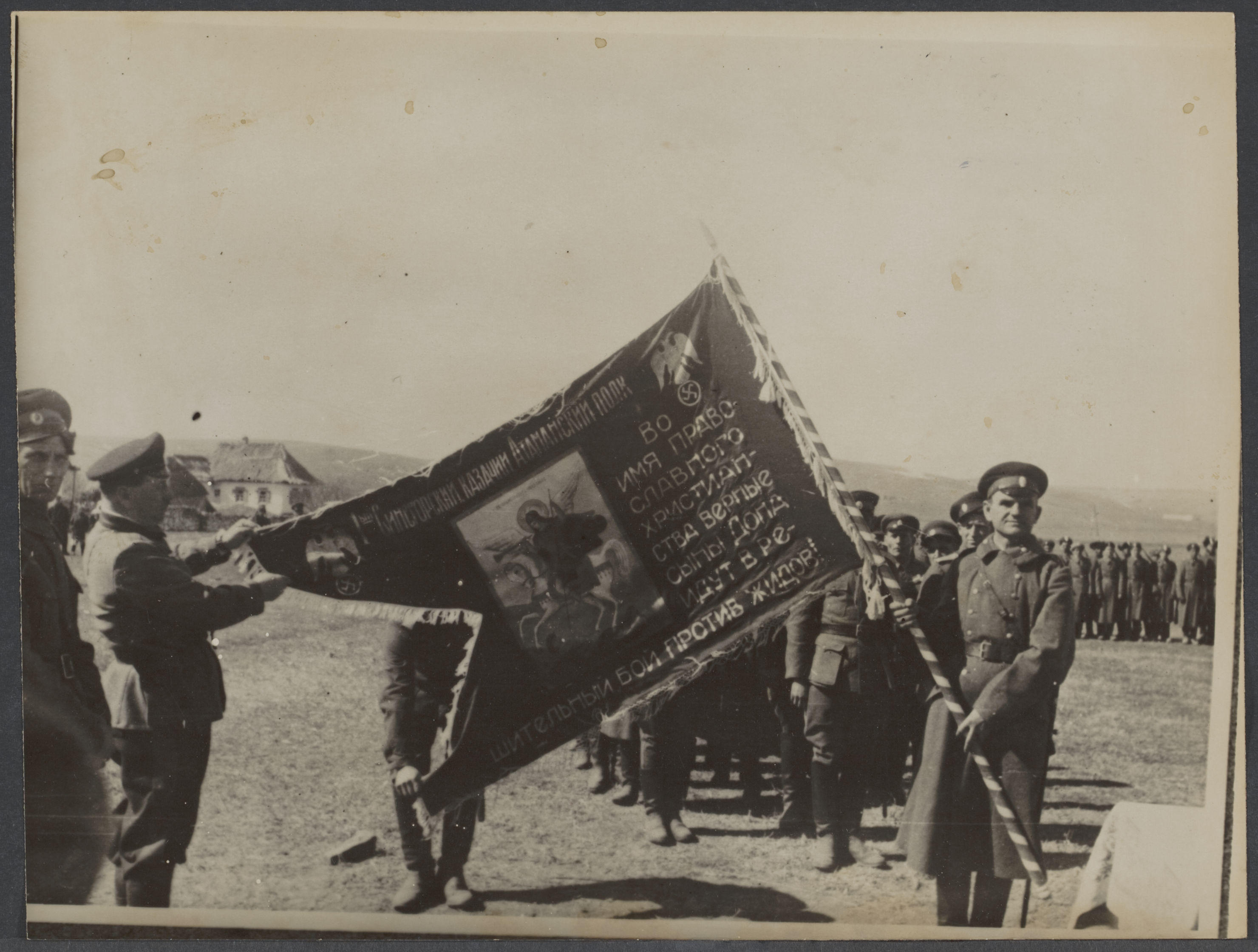
Don Cossack swearing-in. The flag states "in the name of Orthodox Christianity, the faithful sons of the Don go into decisive battle against the Jews!""

Adolf Hitler authorised the formation of the division on 6 April 1943. The division was formed and trained at Mielau (Mława) in the spring-summer of 1943. The Cossacks brought their wives and children with them, forcing the Germans to establish another camp to house the dependents.

The division was formed starting 4 August 1943 by merging various Wehrmacht formations composed of Cossack collaborators. The core of the division was formed by the Platow and von Jungschulz Cossack regiments under the command of the Reiterverband Helmuth von Pannwitz, which had all existed since 1942. To these, additional new regiments were added. Some other units brought in were the Cossack Reconnaissance Battalion, led by Don Cossack Nikolai Nazarenko, the Kosaken-Abteilung 600 led by Ivan Kononov, also a Don Cossack, and a force of Terek Cossacks led by Ataman Nikolai Kulakov (Cossack leader) of the Terek host. About 7,000 personnel of the division were recruited from the Ostarbeiter (slave laborers) already in Germany. The recruitment drive was managed by the Main Administration of Cossack Forces of the Reich Ministry for the Occupied Eastern Territories.

== Composition ==
Many of the German officers were Baltic German émigrés who possessed the necessary knowledge of Russian.

However, owing to a shortage of officers with the necessary Russian language skills, the Wehrmacht was forced to relax its policy against accepting émigré officers, and a number of Cossack émigré officers living in Yugoslavia, France, Germany and the Protectorate of Bohemia and Moravia (modern Czechia) were recruited into the division. Other officers were the sons of Cossack émigrés who had served in the armies of France, Yugoslavia and Bulgaria before the war. A disproportionate number of the German officers were cavalrymen, and Austrians were over-represented as it was felt that Austrians were more "tactful" in dealing with Slavs than the Prussians.

== Anti-partisan reprisals ==
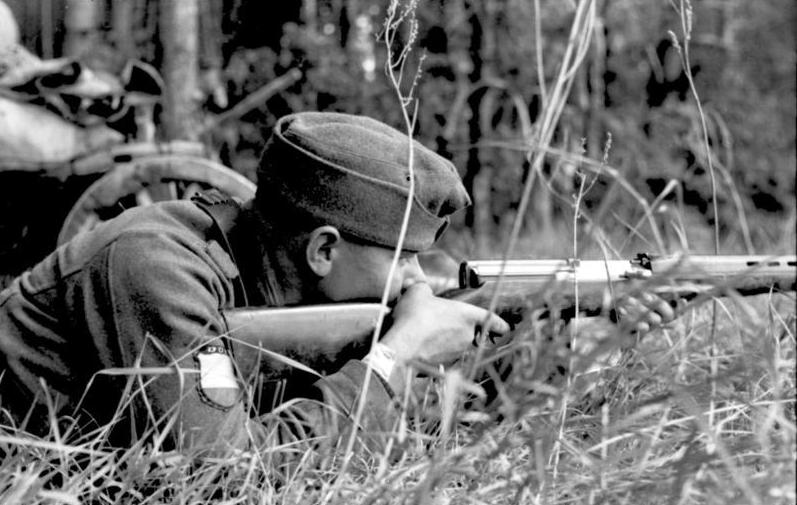
Soldier of the 1st Cossack Cavalry Division (Don Cossack) lying on the ground and aiming with a Soviet Tokarev SVT-40 rifle.

Initially organized to fight the Red Army in southern Russia, the division was soon deployed to the puppet Independent State of Croatia, where they were placed under the command of the Second Panzer Army and were used to protect the railroad line from Austria through Zagreb to Belgrade. Some units were also used to fight Partisans.

The division's first fighting engagement was on 12 October 1943, when it was dispatched against Yugoslav Partisans in the Fruška Gora Mountains. In the operation the Cossacks, aided by 15 tanks and one armored car, captured the village of Beocin, a Partisan HQ. In that operation many villages were burned, including a monastery on Fruška Gora, and around 300 Serbian civilians were killed. Subsequently, the unit was used to protect the Zagreb-Belgrade railroad and the Sava Valley. Several regiments of the division took part in security warfare (Bandenbekämpfung) and guarded the Sarajevo railroad. As part of a wide security sweep, Napfkuchen, the Cossack division was transferred to Croatia, where it fought against Yugoslav Partisans and the Soviet Army in 1944–1945.

The Cossacks felt closer to this Serbian minority in NDH than they did to the Croatian people. Due to the Cossack identification with the Serbian cause, the Cossacks concluded an unofficial truce with Tito's rival, the royalist Serbian resistance leader, General Dragoljub Mihailović, who regarded Tito and the Ustaše as a more serious enemy than the Germans.

In Croatia the division quickly established a reputation for undisciplined and ruthless behavior, not only towards the partisans but also the civilian population, prompting Croatian authorities to complain to the Germans and finally to Adolf Hitler himself. Besides raping women, killing people and plundering and burning towns suspected of harboring partisans and their supporters, the division used telegraph poles along the railroad tracks for mass hangings as a warning to the partisans and others. Although the behavior of the Cossacks was not as ruthless as portrayed by Partisan propaganda, nevertheless during its first two months of deployment in Croatia, special divisional courts-martial imposed at least 20 death sentences in each of the four regiments for related crimes.

The Cossacks' first engagement against the Red Army occurred in December 1944 near Pitomača. The fighting resulted in Soviet withdrawal from the area.

== Transfer to Waffen-SS ==
In December 1944 the 1st Cossack Division was transferred to the Waffen-SS and reorganized by the SS Führungshauptamt. Until 30 April 1945, together with the 2nd Cossack Division it was part of the newly formed XV SS Cossack Cavalry Corps.

== Aftermath ==
At the end of the war Cossacks of the division retreated into Austria and surrendered to British troops. They were disarmed and subsequently forcibly transferred to the USSR. The majority of those who did not manage to escape went to labour camps in the Gulag. The German and Cossack leadership were tried, sentenced to death and executed in Moscow in early 1947. The remaining officers and other ranks who survived the labour camps were released after Stalin's death in 1953.

== Commanders ==
- Lt. Gen. Helmuth von Pannwitz (Sep 1943 – Feb 1945)
  - Col. Hans-Joachim von Schultz, Chief of Staff
- Col. von Baath (Feb – ? 1945)
- Col. Alexander von Boesse (1945)
- Col. Konstantin Wagner (1945)

== Order of battle ==
In 1944 the division was composed of the following units:

=== 1st Cossack Cavalry Brigade Don ===
- 1st (Don) Cossack Cavalry Regiment
- 2nd (Ural) Cossack Cavalry Regiment
- 3rd (Combined) Cossack Cavalry Regiment
- Cossack Horse Artillery Regiment Don

=== 2nd Cossack Cavalry Brigade ===
- 4th (Kuban) Cossack Cavalry Regiment
- 5th (Don) Cossack Cavalry Regiment
- 6th (Terek) Cossack Cavalry Regiment
- Cossack Horse Artillery Regiment Kuban

=== Divisional units ===
- 55th Reconnaissance Battalion
- 55th (Kuban) Cossack Horse Artillery Regiment
- 1st Cossack Engineer Battalion
- 55th Cossack Engineer Battalion
- 1st Signal Battalion

== See also ==
- List of German divisions in World War II
- List of Waffen-SS divisions
- List of SS personnel
