= General Keller =

General Keller may refer to:

- Alfred Keller (1882–1974), German Luftwaffe general
- Fyodor Arturovich Keller (1857–1918), Imperial Russian Army general of the cavalry
- Fyodor Eduardovich Keller (1850–1904), Imperial Russian Army lieutenant general
- Robert P. Keller (1920–2010), U.S. Marine Corps lieutenant general
- Rod Keller (1900–1954), Canadian Army major general

== See also ==
- Keller E. Rockey (1888–1970), United States Marine Corps lieutenant general
