= Fyodor Keller =

Fyodor Keller may refer to:

- Fyodor Eduardovich Keller (1850–1904), Imperial Russian Army lieutenant general
- Fyodor Arturovich Keller (1857–1918), Imperial Russian Army general of the cavalry
