= Nikolai Nazarenko =

Don Cossack who collaborated with Nazi Germany (1911–1992)

Nikolai Grigorievich Nazarenko
- Born: 19 December 1911; Starocherkasskaya, Don Host Oblast, Russian Empire
- Died: 20 November 1992 (aged 80); Rockland County, New York, United States
- Military career
- Allegiance: Romania; Soviet Union; Nazi Germany
- Known for: Cossack collaboration with Nazi Germany

Nikolai Grigorievich Nazarenko (Russian: Николай Григорьевич Назаренко; 19 December 1911 – 20 November 1992) was a Don Cossack who collaborated with Nazi Germany during World War II. In his later career, he was a Cossack émigré leader who served as president of the World Federation of the Cossack National Liberation Movement of Cossackia and the Cossack American Republican National Federation.

== Emigre and spy ==
Nazarenko was born in Starocherkasskaya in the territory of the Don Cossack Host. The Don Cossacks in common with the other Cossack Hosts of the Russian empire were a privileged group, being granted exemption from taxation, allowed to own their own land and to elect most of the officials of the Host government (through not the ataman who headed the Host who was always appointed by the Emperor) in exchange for serving as one of the main bulwarks of the House of Romanov. The culture of the Cossacks was centered around riding horses and warfare. For a certain period of time every year, the men of the Host had to leave their farms to serve in the Imperial Russian Army as irregular cavalry or alternatively as a para-military police force in one of the provinces of the vast Russian empire, which served to increase the popular identification of the Cossacks as one of the most important bulwarks of the system . In 1913, the 2 million people of the Don Cossack Host owned 13 of the 17 million hectares of the land by the banks of the river Don and whose income was double that of a typical Russian muzhik (peasant). The Don Cossacks spoke their own dialect of Russian and the men dressed in distinctive colorful uniforms, which marked them out. Every Host had its own uniform, but a common aspect of all Cossack uniforms was that the men wore a gazyr (a bullet carrying vest), a wool hat known as the papakha and carried around a type of sword called the shashka. The Cossack Hosts who had long owned their land quickly came into conflict with the new Bolshevik regime, and all of the atamans committed their Hosts to fight for the White Army in the Russian Civil War. In 1918 Nazarenko's family fled to Romania. Nazarenko grew up in Romania and subsequently enlisted in the Romanian Army.

Owing to his Russian language skills, he was recruited as a spy for Romania. Nazarenko was sent on an espionage mission for Romania into the Soviet Union in 1933, but was captured crossing the Dniester river at night and imprisoned. After escaping from prison, Nazarenko settled in Taganrog in 1935. Taganrog was in the traditional territory of the Don Cossack Host, and many of the local people were hostile to the Soviet regime. Using an assumed name, Nazarenko was able to take command of a Don Cossack militia being sent to support the Red Army in the fall of 1941. At the factory he worked in, a militia was recruited to fight for the Red Army, and Nazarenko had enough knowledge of military matters to be given command with the rank of First Lieutenant. Nazarenko subverted his workers' militia unit and persuaded them to fight for Germany instead. The fact that most of the men in the workers' militia were fellow Don Cossacks who had lost their land under the Soviet regime greatly assisted Nazarenko with persuading his unit to switch sides.

== World War II ==
As German forces approached the Mius river, Nazarenko's workers' militia company attacked the Red Army. Nazarenko and his men were positioned on the second line, and seeing the Wehrmacht was close by, he gave the orders to attack the Red Army's first line. In October 1941, the XIV Panzer Corps of the Wehrmacht discovered that the 9th Soviet Army was engaged in battle against a Cossack formation led by Nazarenko, which surprised them. After being relieved by the Wehrmacht, Nazarenko and his 80 surviving men were sent to the rear. Nazarenko met General Gustav von Wietersheim and insisted to him that his loyalties were to Germany. Nazarenko argued that he wanted to overthrow the Soviet regime and he saw Operation Barbarossa as the beginning of the "liberation" of his people. Nazarenko and his men were enlisted into the Wehrmacht as a reconnaissance battalion, wearing German uniforms with the words Kosaken stamped on them.

On 23 October 1941, Nazarenko and his men formally took an oath of loyalty to Adolf Hitler, swearing he would obey and fight for Hitler for the rest of his life. Nazarenko was given a German officer's peaked hat, which he altered by the removing the red, white and black roundle and replacing it with the blue and white of the Don Cossack Host. He followed the XIV Panzer corps to Rostov and was shortly transferred over to the 1st Panzer Army. The Cossack Reconnaissance Battalion was primarily used for anti-partisan duties and for guarding Red Army POWs, and was judged to be successful in performing these duties. The Cossack units serving with the Wehrmacht had an extremely brutal reputation when it came to anti-partisan duties, being used to do "dirty work" that the Germans did not wish to do themselves such as shooting Jews.

In February 1942, Alexander Siusiukin, a Don Cossack serving in the Red Army contacted the Wehrmacht, saying many of his fellow Don Cossacks viewed Hitler as a liberator and were prepared to do anything to assist in Germany's victory. Siuskukin was put into touch with Nazarenko and a means of communication were opened. By 1942, Nazarenko, through his rank was only first lieutenant was commanding a force of 500 men. On 14 October 1942, Nazarenko attended Pokrov, the Orthodox feast honoring the Intercession of the Theotokos by the Virgin Mary with the Altman Sergei Pavlov (Cossack leader). After Pokrov, Nazarenko toured the countryside dressed in a uniform combining aspects of the traditional Cossack dress such as wearing a gazyr and a papakha while carrying a shashka together with the German uniform, praising Hitler as a "liberator".

Alfred Rosenberg, the Minister of the East (Ostministerium), favored an approach called "political warfare" in order to "free the German Reich from Pan-Slavic pressure for centuries to come". Under Rosenberg's "political warfare" approach, the Soviet Union was to be broken up into four nominally independent states consisting of Ukraine; a federation in the Caucasus; an entity to be called Ostland which would comprise the Baltic states and Belorussia (modern Belarus); and a rump Russian state. Rosenberg was a fanatical anti-Semite and a Russophobe, but he favored a more diplomatic policy towards the non-Russian and non-Jewish population of the Soviet Union, arguing that this was a vast reservoir of manpower that could be used by the Reich. Initially, Rosenberg considered the Cossacks to be Russians, and he ascribed to the popular German stereotype of Cossacks as thuggish rapists and looters. However, as the numbers of Cossacks rallying to the Reich continued to grow into 1942, Roseberg changed his opinion, deciding that the Cossacks were not Russians after all, instead being a separate "race" descended from the Goths. The Ostministerium was supported by the SS, whose "racial experts" had concluded by 1942 the Cossacks were not Slavs, but rather the descendants of the Ostgoths and thus were Aryans. Rosenberg decided that after the "final victory" Germany would establish a new puppet state to be called Cossackia in the traditional territories of the Don, Kuban, Terek, Askrakhan, Ural and Orenburg Hosts in southeastern Russia. Most of the Cossack leaders such as General Pyotr Krasnov tended to reject the concept of "Cossackia", but since it was German policy to promote "Cossackia", they had little choice in the matter. Nazarenko seems to be one of the Cossack leaders to actually embrace the idea of "Cossackia".

In August 1943, Nazarenko's company of 500 was incorporated into the 1st Cossack Cavalry Division, which was formed and trained in Mielau (modern Mława, Poland). When the 1st Cossack Division was formed, Nazarenko was given soldbuch (paybook) number 1 in recognition for being the first Cossack to fight for Germany. The soldbuch had considerable symbolical significance in the Wehrmacht and being awarded a soldbuch with a high number was a mark of trust. By the summer of 1943, Nazarenko was involved in a relationship with a German woman living in Mielau. One of her neighbors denounced her for sleeping with a Slav, leading to her arrest by the Gestapo. Nazarenko complained to his commander, General Helmuth von Pannwitz, saying he had been faithful to his oath to Hitler and had been fighting for the Reich for almost two years. Through Pannwitz was able to use his influence to have the woman released, the incident had soured her enough to cause her to end the relationship. Nazarenko later stated that Pannwitz wanted "the creation of an unified spirit" in the 1st Cossack Division and tried to encourage his officers to treat the Cossacks with respect. Pannwitz put Nazarenko in charge of a counter-intelligence unit to investigate Soviet spies in the 1st Cossack Division. The 1st Cossack Division was sent not in Soviet Union as expected, but instead in Yugoslavia. When the Cossack Division was transferred from the Wehrmacht to the Waffen-SS, Nazarenko also became a part of the SS.

Nazarenko served as a translator and an interrogator of POWs for the Wehrmacht and SS in Romania in 1944. Nazarenko was accused of executing Red Army POWs and of hanging Jews from the lampposts in Odesa, claims which he denied, though he stated in an interview that Jews were his "ideological enemies". In 1944 while living in Belgrade, Nazarenko married the daughter of General Vyacheslav Naumenko, the ataman of the Kuban Cossack Host. Towards the end of World War II, Nazarenko was in Berlin serving as the intelligence chief for the Cossack "government-in-exile" set up by Alfred Rosenberg and headed by Pyotr Krasnov. Nazarenko's father-in-law, Naumenko, served as the "minister of war" in the "government-in-exile" for Cossackia. At the end of World War II, Nazarenko was in Munich, where he surrendered to the Americans. He was not repatriated by the Americans to the Soviets. From 1945 to 1949, Nazarenko worked in Bavaria for the US Army Counterintelligence Corps, being used as a translator and an investigator into possible Soviet agents living in the Displaced Persons camps.

== Republican activist ==
In 1949, he immigrated to the United States, living at various locations in the New York-New Jersey area. In the United States, Nazarenko founded and led the Cossack War Veterans' Association made up of veterans of the 1st Cossack Division. A number of Cossacks who served in the Ostlegionen and the Waffen-SS ended settling in Australia, where they were welcomed as almost matching the Australian ideal of the perfect immigrant as they were white, Christian and anti-Communist with the only black mark against being that they were not Anglo-Irish. Australia came to take in a very number of the Cossacks after 1945, being one of the main destinations for Cossack refugees. Nazarenko spent much time visiting Australia after 1950 to maintain contacts with the Cossacks living there. As the organiser of the annual Captive Nations day parade held every July in New York starting in 1960, Nazarenko had a certain degree of local prominence. In the 1968 and 1972 elections, Nazarenko campaigned for the Republican candidate, Richard Nixon in his capacity as the president of the Cossack American Republican National Federation. At some point, Nazarenko became involved with the Anti-Bolshevik Bloc of Nations (ABN). In 1969, ABN Correspondence, the journal of the ABN, listed him on its board of directors as the Organization Representative for the "Cossackian War Veterans".

In 1969, Nixon founded the National Republican Heritage Groups Council, whose first president was a Hungarian immigrant, Laszlo Pasztor, who began his political career as an activist for the fascist Arrow Cross Party in his native Hungary. The National Republican Heritage Groups Council was designed to reach out to so-called ethnic communities in the United States on behalf of the Republican Party with a special focus on reaching Americans of Eastern European background. Pasztor had much success in the 1968 election as a Republican activist working in neighborhoods inhabited by Eastern European immigrants or the descendants of Eastern European immigrants, leading Nixon to make the Heritage Group a permanent part of the Republican Party. Pasztor in turn recruited Nazarenko into the Heritage Groups Council. The Heritage Croup Council was founded at a conference in Washington D.C. held between 29 and 31 October 1969, with Nixon speaking to the founders at the White House on 30 October 1969. Nazarenko attended the conference, where he was listed as representing the Cossacks. ABN Correspondence described Nazarenko as representing both "Cossackia" and the American Friends of the ABN at the 1969 conference. In 1974, Nazarenko had given himself the rank of colonel and was listed as one of the leaders of the Captive Nations field committee in New York state, where according to Nixon's papers, his address was 21 S Weatern Highway, Blauvelt, New York.

The American scholar Leonard Weinberg described the recruitment of activists such as Pasztor and Nazarenko into the Republican Party in the late 1960s as the beginning of a tilt towards a more right-wing stance within the GOP. Several other members of the National Republican Heritage Groups Council, whose members were mostly Eastern European had connections to fascist causes such as the Romanian-American Florian Galdau who served in the Legion of the Archangel Michael (the Iron Guard) in his native Romania, the Slovak-American Met Balco who organised "annual commemorations of the Slovak Nazi regime", the Ukrainian-American Bohdan Fedorak who was a member of the Organization of Ukrainian Nationalists (OUN) and whose wartime past was "questionable", and the Bulgarian-American Radi Slavoff who had been a member of a fascist group in Bulgaria. The American scholar Jaimee A. Swift wrote the 25 members of the National Republican Heritage Groups Council were almost exclusively concerned with foreign policy and rarely addressed domestic issues. She also noted that despite the stated purpose of the council to improve outreach by the Republican Party to ethnic minorities that the council never had Jewish and Afro-American members. Swift felt it was revealing that most of the members of the National Republican Heritage Groups Council had links to the World Anti-Communist League, which was a gathering of various extreme right-wing groups from around the world. The exclusion of the Jews and blacks from the council was justified under the grounds that those two communities had "special" concerns. The journalist Russ Bellant felt that the argument for "special concerns" for Jewish-Americans and Afro-Americans was specious as Chinese-Americans, Vietnamese-Americans and native Indians could also be said to have "special" concerns, but members of these groups were represented on the council. Bellant noted that many members of the council made it clear that they would not welcome Jewish and black members, which he felt was the real reason for excluding Jews and blacks. In 1972, Nazarenko converted the Cossack War Veterans' Association into the World Federation of the Cossack National Liberation Movement of Cossackia. Nazarenko took part in Captive Nations day parades in his Cossack uniform and as the president of the Cossack American Republican National Federation was active in Republican politics. The Austrian-born American author Julius Epstein described Nazarenko in the early 1970s as living in a modest house in New York together with his wife and father-in-law Naumenko.

In 1978, Nazarenko dressed in his blue Don Cossack uniform led the Captive Days day parade as parade marshal in New York city, and he told a journalist: "Cossackia is a nation of 10 million people. In 1923 the Russians officially abolished Cossackia as a nation. Officially, it no longer exists...America should not spend billions supporting the Soviets with trade. We don't have to be afraid of the Russian army because half of it is made up of Captive Nations. They can never trust the rank and file". The journalist Hal McKenzie described Nazarenko as having "cut a striking figure with his white fur cap, calf-length coat with long silver-sheathed dagger and ornamental silver cartridge cases on his chest." The Captive Nations Day parade in New York was described as being very colorful with people from Europe, Asia and Cuba appearing in their traditional national costumes while the Chinese dragon dance performed to gongs and drums by the Chinese members of the Captive Nations committee added to the atmosphere. A sign of the politics of the Captive Nations committee was that one of the "captive nations" being honored in the parade was Rhodesia (modern Zimbabwe), which at the time was ruled over by a right-wing white supremacist government locked into a war with the left-wing black guerrillas of the Soviet backed Zimbabwe African People's Union and the Chinese backed Zimbabwe African National Union. Rhodesia had been included as one of the "captive nations" under the grounds that the Rhodesian government had been "betrayed" by the United States and the United Kingdom which were pressuring Rhodesia to allow majority rule and that majority rule in Rhodesia was the equivalent of handing the country over to the Communists.

On 21 July 1984, Nazarenko, gave a speech at a diner for the Captive Nations Committee in New York. Nazarenko began by praising those who fought for Nazi Germany in the Ostlegionen and the Waffen-SS as heroes. Turning to his main subject, Nazarenko stated: "There is a certain ethnic group that makes its home in Israel. This ethnic group works with the Communists all the time. They were the Fifth Column in Germany and in all the Captive Nations...They would spy, sabotage and do any act in the interest of Moscow. Of course there had to be the creation of a natural self defense against this Fifth Column. They had to be isolated. Security was needed. So the Fifth Column were arrested and imprisoned. This particular ethnic group was responsible for aiding the Soviet NKVD. A million of our people were destroyed as a result of them aiding the NKVD...You hear a lot about the Jewish Holocaust, but what about the 140 million Christians, Moslems and Buddhists killed by Communism? That is the real Holocaust and you never hear about it!" The audience roared its approval and Nazarenko's speech was the best received of the evening.

On 17 May 1985, Nazarenko attended a speech given by President Ronald Reagan at a meeting of the Republican Heritage Groups Council at the Omni Shoreham Hotel representing the Cossack American Republican National Federation. The next day, Nazarenko was interviewed by the American journalist Russ Bellant. Before Bellant, Nazarenko produced a briefcase full of anti-Semitic literature on the "Jewish question", Cossack publications and memorabilia from his service in the Wehrmacht and the Waffen-SS. Bellant described Nazarenko as a muscular man standing 6'1 with a flamboyant mustache and an unnatural energy for a man of his age together with an immense capacity to consume vodka, to chain-smoke and to express his raging hatred for Jews and Russians. In common with many other Cossack emigres, Nazarenko insisted the Cossacks were a distinctive nation who were not Russians despite speaking Russian. Nazarenko told Bellant that Jews were his "ideological enemies", claiming that Jews invented Communism to oppress Gentiles, and that he was proud to have fought for Nazi Germany. Nazarenko when questioned, denied the Holocaust, saying that "Jews didn't die from gas chambers. Those mountains of bones are from people who starved to death or died of disease". In 2014, Bellant recalled: "I interviewed the Cossack guy; he showed me his pension from service in the SS in World War II, and how he was affiliated with free Nazi groups in the United States, and he was just very unrepentant."

Nazarenko also told Bellant that he was in contact with "patriotic" publications such as The Thunderbolt, The Spotlight and Instauration, submitting them articles. Nazarenko lived comfortably on a veteran's pension provided by the West German government. Nazarenko boasted to Bellant that when meeting Nazis: "They respect me because I was a former German Army officer. Sometimes when I meet these guys, they say 'Heil Hitler!'" Much of Nazarenko's time in the 1980s was taken up with trying to discredit the Office of Special Investigations, the branch of the Justice Department responsible for investigating accused Nazi war criminals living in the United States, which he called part of a "Communist" plot to deport him from the United States.

In an article in the New York Times in 1988, Bellant asked for the Republican Party to expel Nazarenko. The chairwoman of the National Republican Heritage Groups Council, the Chinese-born Anna Chennault was very active in the 1988 election as a Republican activist and she was very dismissive of the charges that the East European members of the council had been Axis collaborators in the war. Chennault had starting in the 1950s become one of the leading spokeswoman for the right-wing "China Lobby" that believed the Communist regime in China was only temporary and that the Kuomintang regime in Taiwan would one day take back the mainland, and accordingly was opposed to American recognition of the People's Republic of China. In connection with her work with the "China Lobby", Chennault had been the long-time chairwoman of the Chinese-American Republican Federation and the Asian-American Republican Federation before being promoted up to become chairwoman of the National Republican Heritage Groups Council in 1987. In late 1988, Nazarenko was expelled from the GOP together with 7 other ethnic organizers with Nazi ties. However, Nazarenko was allowed to remain a member of the Republican Heritage Groups Council, which in effect allowed to retain his Republican party membership. On 28 October 1989, a report written by Chennault and others appeared which denied there were any issues with Axis supporters on the National Republican Heritage Groups Council. By 1989, Nazarenko was allowed to resume his Republican Party membership.

== Books and articles ==
- Bellant, Russ (1991). Old Nazis, the New Right, and the Republican Party. Boston: South End Press. ISBN 0896084183.
- Burleigh, Michael (2001). The Third Reich A New History. New York: Hill and Wang. ISBN 080909326X.
- Beyda, Oleg; Petrov, Igor (2018). "The Soviet Union". In David Stahel (ed.). Joining Hitler's Crusade: European Nations and the Invasion of the Soviet Union, 1941. Cambridge: Cambridge University Press. pp. 369–428. ISBN 978-1316510346.
- Epstein, Julius (1973). Operation Keelhaul; The Story of Forced Repatriation from 1944 to the Present. New York: Devin-Adair Publishing Company. ISBN 0815964072.
- Lee, Martin (2013). The Beast Reawakens: Fascism's Resurgence from Hitler's Spymasters to Today's Neo-Nazi Groups and Right-Wing Extremists. London: Routledge. ISBN 978-1135281311.
- Mueggenberg, Brent (2019). The Cossack Struggle Against Communism, 1917-1945. Jefferson: McFarland. ISBN 978-1476679488.
- Newland, Samuel J. (1991). The Cossacks in the German Army 1941-1945. London: Frank Cass. ISBN 0714681997.
- Persian, Jayne (July 2018). "Cossack Identities: From Russian Émigrés and Anti-Soviet Collaborators to Displaced Persons". Journal Immigrants & Minorities. 36 (2): 125–142. doi:10.1080/02619288.2018.1471856. S2CID 150349528. Archived from the original on 2022-09-26.
- Simpson, Christopher (1988). Blowback: America's Recruitment of Nazis and Its Effects on the Cold War. New York: Grove Atlantic. ISBN 1555841066.
- Weinberg, Leonard (1998). "An Overview of Right-wing Extremism in the Western World: A Study of Convergence, Linkage and Identity". In Jeffrey Kaplan; Tore Bjørgo (eds.). Nation and Race: The Developing Euro-American Racist Subculture. Boston: Northeastern University Press. pp. 3–33. ISBN 1555533329.
