= Semyon Krasnov =

Russian cossack (1893–1947)

- Семён Николаевич Краснов
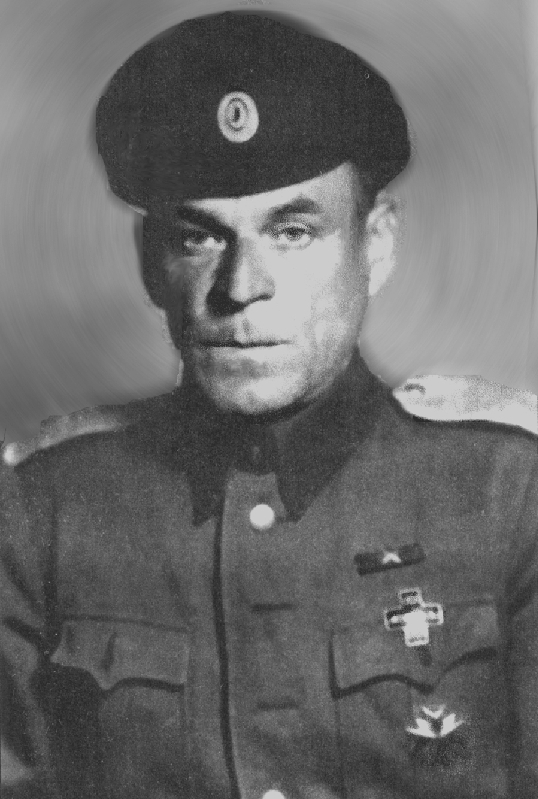
- Krasnov following his arrest by Soviet authorities, 1945
- Born: March 13, 1893; Krasnopolye, Don Host Oblast, Russian Empire
- Died: January 16, 1947 (aged 53); Moscow, Soviet Union
- Relatives: Pyotr Krasnov; Miguel Krassnoff (son)
- Criminal information
- Cause of death: Execution by hanging
- Conviction: Treason
- Penalty: Death
- Military career
- Allegiance: Russian Empire; Don Republic (White Movement); Nazi Germany
- Branch: Imperial Russian Army; White Army; Wehrmacht
- Service years: 1911–1920; 1942–1945
- Rank: Colonel (White Army); Major General (Wehrmacht)
- Unit: Kazachi Stan staff
- Commands: Chief of Staff of the Main Administration of Cossack Forces
- Conflicts: World War I Russian Civil War; World War II

Semyon Nikolayevich Krasnov (Russian: Семён Николаевич Краснов; 13 March 1893 – 16 January 1947) was a Russian Don Cossack military commander and later a prominent Cossack staff officer who collaborated with Nazi Germany during World War II. An "Old émigré" who permanently fled Russia following the defeat of anti-Bolshevik forces in the Russian Civil War, he returned to military activity during World War II, serving as the Chief of Staff of the Main Administration of Cossack Forces at the Reich Ministry for the Occupied Eastern Territories. Captured by British forces in 1945, he was forcibly repatriated to the Soviet Union and subsequently tried in Moscow for high treason and executed.

== Early life and Russian Civil War ==
Semyon Krasnov was born on 13 March 1893 in Krasnopolye, located within the Don Host Oblast of the Russian Empire. He was the first cousin once removed of the prominent Cossack military officer and White Army general, Pyotr Krasnov. Following his education at the Nikolaevskaya Cavalry School, Semyon entered military service in 1911, joining the Life-Guards Cossack Regiment. He fought within the Imperial Russian Army during World War I and subsequently joined the anti-Bolshevik White Movement during the Russian Civil War attaining the rank of Colonel. Following the collapse of the White armies in Southern Russia, Semyon evacuated from the country alongside his family in 1920. During the interwar period, Krasnov lived in exile across France and Germany as a stateless refugee under international Nansen protections, never holding Soviet citizenship or nationality.

== World War II collaboration ==
Following the Axis invasion of the Soviet Union, Krasnov re-entered administrative military activity. In March 1944, he was appointed Chief of Staff of the Main Administration of Cossack Forces (Hauptverwaltung der Kosakenheere), a Nazi-vetted political and logistics bureau operating under Reich Minister Alfred Rosenberg within the Reich Ministry for the Occupied Eastern Territories.

Operating from Berlin, Krasnov managed the day-to-day administrative operations, personnel logs, and communications that linked the political administration to the active field installations. He tightly coordinated his mobilization directives with General Andrei Shkuro, whose recruitment depots (Kosaken-Reserve) under the SS Main Office funneled newly trained Cossack prisoners of war and volunteers to frontline combat commands. During the late-war deployment of the Kazachi Stan to northeastern Italy under SS and Police Leader Odilo Globocnik's command, Krasnov helped administer the autonomous puppet zone known as Kosakenland in Norditalien, where collaborationist forces suppressed local Italian partisan resistance. Following his appointment as Chief of Staff of the Main Administration of Cossack Forces under the Eastern Ministry and the Wehrmacht High Command, his administrative responsibilities over tens of thousands of personnel required a higher rank to interface properly with German generals. The German military authorities formally advanced him to the rank of Major General (Generalmajor) within the Axis collaborationist structure.

== Surrender, repatriation, and trial ==
In May 1945, following the final Axis collapse in Northern Italy, Semyon Krasnov participated in the mass retreat over the Plöcken Pass into Carinthia, Austria, where the remaining population of the Kazachi Stan surrendered to the British Army. On 28 May 1945, utilizing a deceptive military conference ruse, British forces separated the entire Cossack leadership from their families and rank-and-file troops. Because Krasnov had left Russia in 1920 and held non-Soviet citizenship status, his forced delivery to the Soviet lines at Judenburg constituted a direct violation of the repatriation boundaries established at the Yalta Conference.

Following his handover to SMERSH, Krasnov was transferred to Moscow and held in high-security isolation at Lefortovo Prison. On 15–16 January 1947, the Military Collegium of the Supreme Court of the USSR tried Krasnov in a closed judicial proceeding alongside his father Pyotr Krasnov, Timofey Domanov, Andrei Shkuro, and German Lieutenant General Helmuth von Pannwitz. Found guilty of high treason and counter-revolutionary activities under Article 58 of the Soviet Penal Code, Semyon Krasnov was stripped of his ranks and executed by hanging in the courtyard of Lefortovo Prison on the evening of 16 January 1947.

== Family ==
While the core officer corps was handed over to Soviet custody, Semyon Krasnov's wife, Dina Marchenko, and their newborn son, Mikhail Semyonovich Krasnov (born 15 February 1946 in Tirol, Austria), successfully evaded the British repatriation dragnets. Moving through charitable Catholic support networks and international escape lines, they immigrated to Chile in 1948. Adopting the Spanish rendering of his name, Semyon's son entered the Chilean military as Miguel Krassnoff, rising to a high-ranking officer position within the intelligence agency (DINA) during the dictatorship of General Augusto Pinochet, and was later convicted of crimes against humanity.
