= Pavel Keller =

Imperial Russian Navy and Romanian Land Forces officer

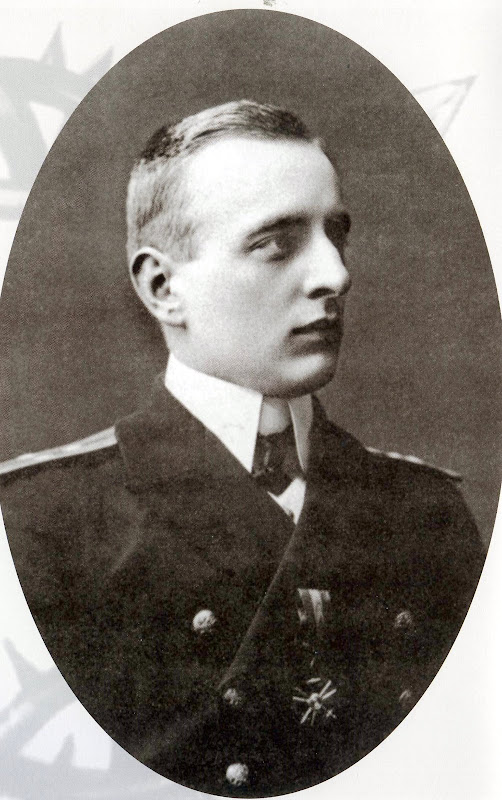
- Native name: Граф Павел Фёдорович Келлер
- Born: Pavel Fyodorovich Keller; 2 June 1883; Vilnius, Vilna Governorate, Russian Empire
- Died: 17 June 1980 (aged 97) Eutin, Schleswig-Holstein, West Germany
- Allegiance: Russian Empire; White Movement; Kingdom of Romania
- Branch: Imperial Russian Navy; Romanian Armed Forces
- Service years: 1899–1918; 1941–1944
- Rank: Captain 1st rank (Russia); Colonel (Romania)
- Conflicts: Russo-Japanese War: Battle of Port Arthur; World War I Russian Civil War: Evacuation of the Crimea; Eastern Front: Crimean campaign; Crimean offensive

Graf Pavel Fyodorovich Keller (Russian: Граф Павел Фёдорович Келлер; German: Paul von Keller; 21 May [2 June] 1883 – 17 June 1980) was an officer of the Imperial Russian Navy (submariner, Captain 1st rank) and of the Romanian Land Forces (intelligence colonel). He participated in the Russo-Japanese War, World War I, the Russian Civil War on the White side, and World War II on the side of the Kingdom of Romania. He was later repressed in the Soviet Union and, after his release, emigrated to France and later to West Germany.

== Biography ==
Keller was born on 21 May (2 June) 1883 in Vilnius, the son of Cavalry General Count Fyodor Arturovich Keller and Elizaveta-Maria Eduardovna von Rönne. He was of Lutheran faith.

In 1901, he graduated from the Naval Cadet Corps and was commissioned as a midshipman (having served as a naval cadet since 1899).

He took part in the Russo-Japanese War and the defense of Port Arthur. In 1904, while in Port Arthur, he served as midshipman and watch officer aboard the battleship Pobeda, and as flag officer on the staff of the acting squadron commander in Port Arthur (30 July – 25 August 1904).

After the war, he served in the Baltic Fleet. In 1907, he completed the Submarine Training Detachment course in Libau, was entered into the "List of Submarine Officers," and promoted to lieutenant. He commanded the submarines Peskary (1906–1907) and Kambala (1907–1909).

From 23 June 1909 to 9 May 1911, he was seconded to the Naval General Staff, serving as naval attaché to Denmark, Sweden, and Norway (9 May 1911 – 1914); he was promoted to Senior lieutenant on 10 April 1911.

On 6 April 1914, he was promoted to Captain 2nd rank and from 3 March 1914 acted as executive officer, officially serving in that role from 14 April 1914 to 1915 on the cruiser Admiral Makarov. He later commanded a division of AG-type submarines and served as flag captain on the staff of the commander of the Baltic Sea Submarine Division, participating in World War I.

On 11 May 1917, he was reassigned to the Black Sea Fleet, where he commanded the destroyer Pylkiy.

On 12 September 1917, "for distinguished service," he was promoted to Captain 1st rank, with seniority from 28 July 1917.

On 5 March 1918, after the October Revolution and the Bolshevik takeover, he was dismissed from service.

During the Russian Civil War, Keller fought on the side of the White forces. From 1919 to 1922, he served in the Russian naval intelligence service.

After the evacuation from Crimea in 1920, he moved to Romania, being a personal friend of Queen Maria of Romania and having some relatives there, receiving Romanian citizenship.

Pavel Keller entered Romanian military intelligence with the rank of Colonel, and took part in World War II. He spent 18 months in Crimea, where he engaged in religious and philanthropic work, financing the rebuilt of the Yalta Cathedral and of the Toplovsky Paraskevievsky Trinity Monastery. Recognizing his merits in organizing community assistance, the Geneva Red Cross approached him and offered him the position of representative in Romania for all matters relating to the "Nansen" refugees, an appointment accepted by the Romanian government. In 1944, while in Crimea as a Romanian officer, he was captured by the Red Army. He was convicted of betrayal (despite the fact that he was a Romanian citizen) and spent 11 years in labor camps.

Released in 1955, he returned to Romania, settling in Sibiu, but in November of the same year moved to France, and later to West Germany. He died in Eutin at the age of 97.

== Family ==
Keller's children became officers of the Romanian Army. His youngest son, Alexander, died during the Battle of Stalingrad, despite the fact that a Romanian general offered him a plane to evacuate himself. He refused to leave, because he was the only officer left from the 12th Călăraşi Regiment. He died while fighting the Soviet tanks, and he received the posthumously the Military Order "Mihai Viteazul", 3rd Class, "for bravery, dedication, spirit, sacrifice, and care for the wounded in the câmpul de luptă" (Mihai Viteazul), by Royal Decree No. 517 of March 9, 1944.

== Awards ==
=== Russian Empire ===
- Order of Saint Stanislaus, 3rd Class with Swords and Bow (26 March 1904)
- Order of Saint Vladimir, 4th Class with Swords and Bow (12 December 1905)
- Medal "In Memory of the Russo-Japanese War" (silver, 1906)
- Order of Saint Anna, 3rd Class (22 April 1907)
- Order of Saint Stanislaus, 2nd Class (6 December 1911)
- Medal "In Memory of the 300th Anniversary of the Reign of the House of Romanov" (1913)
- Cross "For Port Arthur" (officer's, 1914)
- Order of Saint Anna, 2nd Class with Swords (5 January 1915)
- Medal "In Memory of the 200th Anniversary of the Battle of Gangut" (1915)

=== Badges ===
- Badge "In Memory of the 200th Anniversary of the Naval Corps" (1901)
- Gold Badge for graduating from the Naval Cadet Corps (1910)

=== Romania ===
- Military Virtue Medal
- Order of the Crown of Romania, Officer
- Order of the Star of Romania, Knight

=== Foreign awards ===
- (Sweden) Order of Vasa, Commander 2nd Class (1914)
- (France) Legion of Honour, Knight (1914)
- (Norway) Order of St. Olav, Knight 1st Class (1914)
- (Denmark) Order of the Dannebrog, Knight (1914)
- (Nazi Germany) Order of the German Eagle, Commander
