= Battle of Motien Pass =

Confrontation of the russo-japanese war

Coordinates: 40°00′N 122°30′E

- Part of the Russo-Japanese War
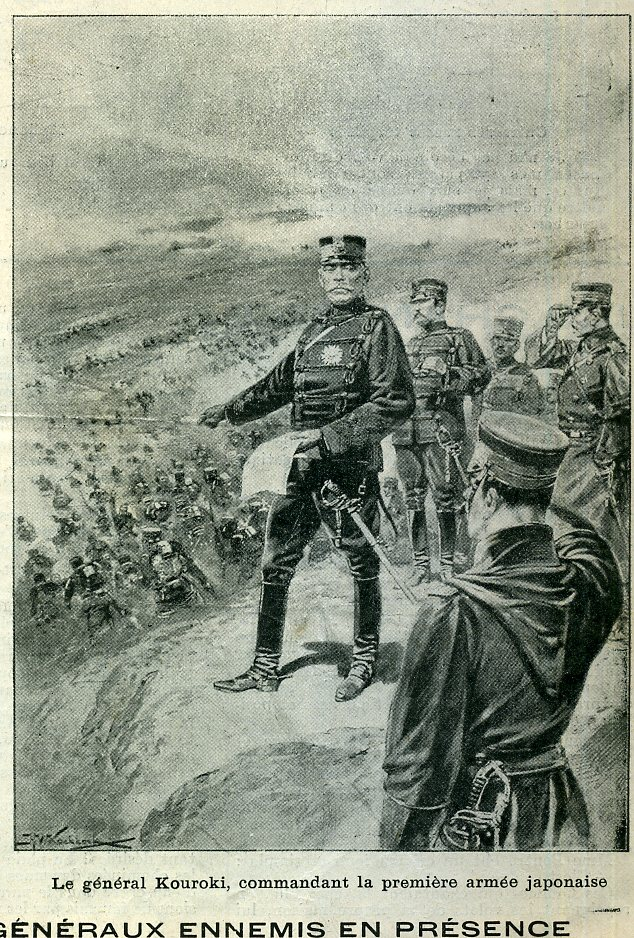
- General Kuroki, Japanese commander at Battle of Motien Pass
Date	10 July 1904
Location	Liaodong, Manchuria, Qing China (present-day Lianshanguan, Benxi Manchu Autonomous County, China)
Result	Japanese victory

Belligerents
Empire of Japan	Russian Empire

Commanders and leaders
Kuroki Tamemoto	Fyodor Eduardovich Keller †

Strength
11,000	25,000

Casualties and losses
355	1,213

The Battle of Motien Pass was a minor land battle of the Russo-Japanese War, fought between the Imperial Japanese Army under General Kuroki Tamemoto and the Imperial Russian Army under General Fyodor Eduardovich Keller over control of a strategic mountain pass on the main road between the coast and Liaoyang in Qing China on 10 July 1904.

== Preliminary movements ==
General Fyodor Keller had assumed command of the Russian Eastern Force from General Zasulich after the Battle of Yalu River. His force of 25,000 men held Motien Pass, in the middle of Liaodong Peninsula, on the main road between Antung (modern Dandong, China) and Liaoyang. Keller, a loyal friend of General Aleksey Kuropatkin and a student of General Mikhail Skobelev, observed that the Japanese strategy was similar to that of the First Sino-Japanese War (i.e. that the three Japanese armies would converge on Haicheng, as they had 10 years previously). Kuropatkin agreed, and in an effort to fortify his position at Haicheng, he began a series of complex and confusing troop movements as he endeavored to plug real or imaginary gaps in his defensive line. Keller, already weakened by the loss of men at the Battle of Te-li-Ssu, was further forced to give up two more regiments to Kuropatkin's defenses at Haicheng.

The Japanese 1st Army, under command of General Kuroki Tamemoto, paused at Fenghuangshan (modern Fengcheng, Liaoning Province, China) from 2–8 July to await supplies and reinforcements. Kuroki decided to attack on 9 July, which was, by coincidence, the same day that General Keller received orders from General Kuropatkin depriving him of yet another regiment to support the defenses of Haicheng.

Guarding the strategic Motien Pass, the Russians had three infantry regiments, three artillery batteries and a Cossack regiment. To the west was the reserve infantry regiment supported by a Cossack brigade. During the night of 8–9 July, a Japanese force moved along an unguarded path to the rear of the Russian right flank. This force was supported by Maxim machine guns and mountain artillery. Another group, clad in Japanese straw sandals to mask their movements, moved around the Russian left flank undetected.

== Battle ==
The battle began at 05:15 on 10 July with a direct Japanese frontal attack. This attack faltered by 07:00 due to strong artillery fire from the Russian positions; however, by 08:00, the Russians found themselves all but encircled by the Japanese flanking attack.

== Aftermath ==
The Japanese moved in to occupy Motien Pass on 13 July. Casualties on both sides were relatively light, and later commentators have speculated extensively on why General Keller (otherwise known to be competent) abandoned such a strategic and easily defendable location with so little resistance. Keller, who perished due to shrapnel wounds from Japanese artillery in an ill-fated counterattack to retake Motien Pass, left no notes.
