= 3rd Cavalry Corps (Russian Empire) =

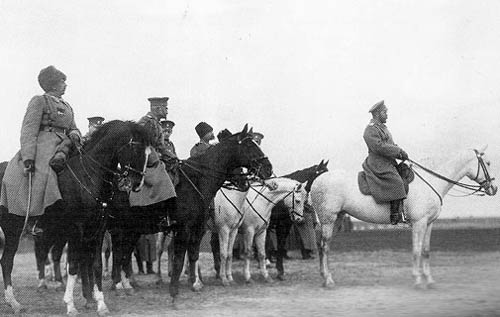
- General F. A. Keller (left) with Emperor Nicholas II.
- Country: Russian Empire; Provisional Government
- Allegiance: Imperial Russian Army
- Engagements: World War I

The 3rd Cavalry Corps (Russian: 3-й кавалерийский корпус) was a cavalry corps in the Imperial Russian Army.

== Composition ==
- 10th Cavalry Division
- 1st Don Cossack Division
- 2nd Combined Cossack Division (1915–1916)
- 12th Cavalry Division (1916–1917)

== Part of ==
- 4th Army: 1914–1915
- 9th Army: 1915
- 6th Army: 1915
- 4th Army: 1916–1917
- 11th Army: 1917
- 1st Army: 1917

== Commanders ==
- General F. A. Keller: 1915–1917
- Lieutenant General Aleksandr Krymov: 1917
- Lieutenant General N. L. Junakov: 1917
- Major General Pyotr Krasnov: 1917
