= The Great Betrayal (Naumenko book) =

Book by Vyacheslav Naumenko

- Author: Vyacheslav Naumenko
- Original title: Великое предательство: Выдача казаков в Лиенце и других местах (1945–1947) (Velikoe Predatelstvo)
- Language: Russian; English
- Subject: Repatriation of Cossacks after World War II
- Genre: Memoir (anthology of primary source materials)
- Publication date: 1962 (Volume I); 1970 (Volume II)
- Publication place: United States
- Media type: Print

The Great Betrayal is a non-fiction book by Vyacheslav Naumenko, a Kuban Cossack leader, commander in the White Army, and later a Nazi collaborator. Published in two volumes in 1962 and 1970, it documents the forced repatriation of Cossacks to the Soviet Union after World War II. Writing from exile, Naumenko relied on personal archives, testimonies, and memoirs from survivors, alleging a deliberate betrayal by the British side during the handovers that took place in Allied-occupied Austria in May and June 1945.

Academic analysis recognizes the work's role in highlighting the ethical and legal controversies of the post-war repatriations by providing a wealth of testimony from the event's participants. Despite its valuable contributions, scholars note several historical distortions, including whitewashing of the Cossack units' records to obfuscate their collaboration with Nazi Germany or participation in brutal anti-partisan reprisals during the war. While Naumenko relied on rumors alleging that Soviet forces executed thousands of Cossacks en masse at border crossings like Judenburg, modern historians utilizing declassified Soviet and British records have proven these specific accounts to be incorrect. The executions were limited to top commanders tried for treason in Moscow.

== Narrative structure ==
The books deals with the repatriation of the XV SS Cossack Cavalry Corps and the "Kazachi Stan" (Cossack Encampment), cossack refugees and irregulars who evacuated the North Caucasus alongside the Wehrmacht in 1943. Naumenko structures his two volumes not as a conventional, chronological historical narrative, but as an expansive, emotionally driven dossier of collective grief and political condemnation. The bulk of the two volumes consists of a massive compilation of primary materials smuggled out of postwar Europe or preserved in exile. Naumenko weaves together personal diary entries from Cossack diary writers, private letters, operational reports smuggled from the camps, and statements from surviving medical doctors, Orthodox priests, and rank-and-file troops.

Volume 1 focuses predominantly on the civilian-heavy encampment of the Kazachi Stan and the events at Lienz-Peggetz. It details the operational mechanics of the British roundups in the Lienz-Peggetz fields and the systematic deception efforts to separate the Cossack leadership from the rank-and-file troops and civilian refugees before the forced repatriation process began. The volume includes diary entries, camp announcements, and descriptions of the family units, the Orthodox priests, and the immediate suicides at the Drava River during the June 1, 1945 roundups.

Volume 2, published eight years later, widens the scope to comprehensively cover the frontline fighting units. Naumenko provides a detailed reconstruction of the final days, retreat, and formal surrender of General Helmuth von Pannwitz's XV SS Cossack Cavalry Corps. This volume acts as a primary source for the separate, strictly military handovers of the armed cavalry divisions that took place at the Judenburg bridge checkpoints, tracking how the combatant troops were processed differently from the Lienz civilians. It expands deeper into the geography of the Soviet aftermath, relying on testimonies from individuals who managed to survive or escape the Soviet NKVD filtration network and transit camps in Judenburg and Graz.

Naumenko frames the Kazachi Stan and the XV Cossack Corps not as separate entities or political collaborators, but as a singular, deeply religious, and organic "Cossack Nation". By focusing heavily on the presence of the 100+ Russian Orthodox priests, the women, the elderly Civil War veterans, and the children in the camps, he frames the community as a holy, traditional society fleeing godless Bolshevism. The narrative is explicitly framed around a deep sense of psychological shock and betrayal by the British military. Naumenko constantly emphasizes the "word of honor" given by British officers, framing the Allies not just as political opponents, but as morally bankrupt actors who used cruel, un-Christian deception (such as the fake May 28 conference) to deliver a defenseless, trusting population to certain execution.

== Historical accuracy ==
Modern scholars note several critical inaccuracies, historical distortions, and narrative exaggerations. While historians like Christopher Booker and Pavel Polian deeply respect the book as an emotional collection of raw survivor testimonies, they emphasize that Naumenko was a deeply biased participant rather than an objective historian. For example, Naumenko frequently relies on early rumors and dramatic survivor testimonies claiming that the Soviet NKVD and SMERSH units set up machine-gun nests directly across the Soviet-British demarcation line and summarily executed the vast majority of the 18,000 Cossack troops the moment they crossed the Judenburg bridge. Modern historians utilizing Soviet and British archives have proven this to be a massive exaggeration. While top officers were separated and later tried and executed, and individual executions certainly happened in transit prisons, there was no immediate, indiscriminate demarkation line massacre. Instead, the vast majority of the rank-and-file troops were systematically kept alive, processed through filtration camps, and sent to long-term forced labor inside the Gulag network.

Naumenko argues that the British high command broke clear international law across the board by returning the Cossacks, asserting that the entire Lienz camp population should have automatically qualified for political asylum. Scholars point out that Naumenko, writing without access to the classified British Foreign Office archives, failed to grasp the high-level diplomatic pressure surrounding the issue. Under the strict bilateral legal framework negotiated at Yalta, the Western Allies were legally bound to return anyone holding pre-1939 Soviet citizenship. While the British did violate the agreement by mistakenly wrapping up 3,000 non-Soviet "White émigrés", the forced repatriation of the rest of the Soviet-born Cossack troops and civilians was technically compliant with the dark bureaucratic mandates agreed upon by Allied leaders.

In Volume 1, the narrative heavily implies that "several thousand" Cossacks, predominantly women and children, died on the morning of June 1, 1945, due to direct British military violence or mass drownings in the Drava (Drau) River. Local Austrian recovery records, cemetery registries, and British unit war diaries examined by Christopher Booker establish that the actual death toll at the Lienz-Peggetz camp on June 1 was roughly 700 to 1,300 victims. While still a horrific humanitarian tragedy, Naumenko's early figures inflated the on-site casualties to maximize the emotional charge of the "betrayal" narrative.

== Ideological bias ==
As a staunch anti-communist who collaborated with the Axis powers, Naumenko presents the Cossack units strictly as noble, innocent victims of Western geopolitics and of Bolshevik tyranny, while heavily sanitizing the combat record of the XV SS Cossack Cavalry Corps. Naumenko completely omits the brutal, well-documented role the Cossack corps played on the Eastern Front and during anti-partisan reprisals in Yugoslavia and Northern Italy.

Modern scholarship notes that Naumenko views the entire history strictly through the lens of the Cossack-Bolshevik struggle that began in 1917 and treats World War II merely as an extension of the Russian Civil War. By completely ignoring the Cossack units' integration into the Wehrmacht and Waffen-SS apparatus, Naumenko frames the Cossacks strictly as "political refugees" seeking asylum. This deliberate framing allows him to argue that the British actions were an unprovoked, purely villainous war crime, completely stripping away the complex, pressured geopolitical realities and wartime classification protocols that the Allies were operating under at the end of Europe's total war.

While émigré compilations like Naumenko's The Great Betrayal preserve the intense tragedy of the Lienz handovers, they systematically obfuscate the Cossack units' records. The overarching motivation for British V Corps commanders on the ground was that they were faced with an organized and active hostile military formation that had surrendered en masse in German uniform. The tactical reality was that the Western Allies were not dealing with harmless, displaced refugees, but rather a heavily armed Axis combat force—a reality that directly shaped the British determination to carry out the repatriation mandates.

== Publication history ==
The two volumes of Velikoe Predatelstvo were translated into English by the American novelist William Dritschilo under the title The Great Betrayal in 2015 and 2018:

- The Great Betrayal Volume I, translated by William Dritschilo, CreateSpace Independent Publishing Platform: Scotts Valley, California, 2015 ISBN 1511524170
- .The Great Betrayal Volume II, translated by William Dritschilo, CreateSpace Independent Publishing Platform: Scotts Valley, California, 2018, ISBN 1986932354
