= Cossackia =

Region in Eastern Europe

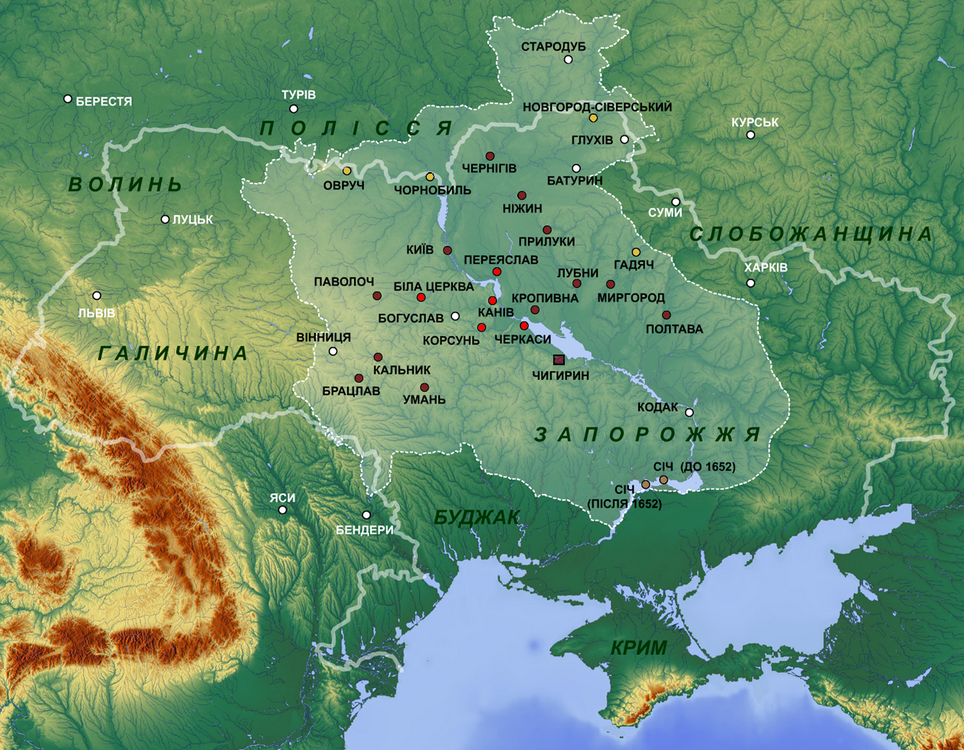
Map of the Zaporozhian Host, also known as the Cossack Hetmanate, 1649–1654

Cossackia (Russian: Казакия; Ukrainian: Козакія) is a term sometimes used to refer to the traditional areas where the Cossack communities live in Russia and Ukraine, and to the lands of the Zaporizhian Host. Depending on its context, "Cossackia" may mean the ethnographic area of Cossack habitat or a proposed Cossack state independent from the Soviet Union.

== Early 20th century ==
The name "Cossackia" became popular among the Cossack émigrés in Europe after the Russian Revolution of 1917 and the ensuing civil war. It was used to designate a union of seven Cossack territorial Hosts ("units")— the Don, Kuban, Terek, Astrakhan, Ural, Orenburg, and the Kalmuk district. The idea of Cossackia was first mooted in December 1920 by a group of Cossack emigres in Constantinople who founded the Union for the Resurrection of Cossackdom. The majority of the Cossacks in exile saw themselves as Russians, and the idea of Cossackia was disallowed by the atamans of the Don, Kuban, and Terek Hosts. The majority of the Cossack emigres were living in poverty and had little interest in the project. Calls for an independent Cossackia emerged within the vibrant émigré Cossack community in Prague, Czechoslovakia, later in the 1920s. The principle champion of Cossackia was Vasily Glazkov, a Don Cossack who founded the Cossack National Center in Prague. Glazkov's Cossack National Center had about only 12 members, but gained an influential patron in the form of Nazi Germany. After the German occupation of the Czech half of Czecho-Slovakia in March 1939, the Cossack National Center was the only Cossack group permitted to operate in Prague with the others all being closed. A project of a constitution for Cossackia was also devised and envisaged the creation of the state of Cossackia and its secession from the Soviet Union.

== World War II ==
During World War II, some proponents of "Cossackia" rallied behind Germany and attempted to establish a notionally independent Cossack state. Alfred Rosenberg, the Minister of the East (Ostministerium), favored an approach called "political warfare" in order to "free the German Reich from Pan-Slavic pressure for centuries to come". Under Rosenberg's "political warfare" approach, the Soviet Union was to be broken up into four nominally independent states consisting of Ukraine; a federation in the Caucasus; an entity to be called Ostland which would comprise the Baltic states and Belorussia (modern Belarus); and a rump Russian state. Rosenberg was a fanatical anti-Semite and racist but he favored a more diplomatic policy towards the non-Russian and non-Jewish population of the Soviet Union, arguing that this was a vast reservoir of manpower that could be used by the Reich.

Initially, Rosenberg considered the Cossacks to be Russians, and he ascribed to the popular German stereotype of Cossacks as thuggish rapists and looters. However, as the numbers of Cossacks rallying to the Reich continued to grow into 1942, Rosenberg changed his opinion, deciding that the Cossacks were not Russians after all, instead being a separate "race" descended from the Goths. The Ostministerium was supported by the SS, whose "racial experts" had concluded by 1942 the Cossacks were not Slavs, but rather the descendants of the Ostrogoths and thus were Aryans. Rosenberg decided that after the "final victory" Germany would establish a new puppet state to be called Cossackia in the traditional territories of the Don, Kuban, Terek, Askrakhan, Ural and Orenburg Hosts in southeastern Russia. Most of the Cossack leaders tended to reject the concept of "Cossackia", but since it was German policy to promote "Cossackia", they had little choice in the matter. Glazkov's separatist ideology was formally embraced as the basis of German policy towards the Cossacks. In 1942, ataman Sergei Pavlov was approached by the Ostministerium with an offer that if he put his Host at the disposal of the Wehrmacht, then Germany would establish Cossackia. Through Pavlov was prepared to fight for Germany, he was less interested in Cossackia. From 1942 onward, Nazi propaganda proclaimed support for establishing Cossackia as a German war aim. Cossacks living in the stanitsas occupied by the Wehrmacht, in German POW camps, and to those serving in the Ostlegionen were bombarded with Nazi propaganda announcing that once the Third Reich won its "final victory" Cossackia would become a reality.

In January 1943, Rosenberg appointed General Pyotr Krasnov, the former ataman of the Don Cossack Host, to the Cossack Central Office of the Ostministrium, making him the point man for the Ostministrium in its dealings with the Cossacks. Krasnov was not a supporter of Cossackia, being appointed principally because Rosenberg believed that a man with his prestige would inspire more Cossacks to enlist in the Wehrmacht. At a meeting with Glazkov in Berlin in July 1944, Krasnov stated that he did not agree with Glazkov's separatism, but was forced to appoint three supporters of Cossackia to important positions in the Cossack Central Office. Under the orders of Odilo Globocnik, the semi-independent military government of Kosakenland (also known as Kosakenland in Norditalien) was established in Carnia, Italy, in order to deal with the local partisan activities; It was described as a long-term solution to the request of a Cosackia by German officials to the ones of the Italian Social Republic given the conditions of the war.

== Post-war ==
After the war, the idea of independent Cossackia retained some support among the Cossack émigrés in Europe and the United States. The 1959 U.S. public law on Captive Nations listed Cossackia among the nations living under oppression of the Soviet regime. The American historian Christopher Simpson wrote that two of the "captive nations" mentioned in the resolution, Idel-Ural and Cossackia, were "fictitious entities created as a propaganda ploy by Hitler's racial theoretician Alfred Rosenberg during World War Two".

The principle supporter of Cossackia in the United States in the Cold War was Nikolai Nazarenko, the self-proclaimed president of the World Federation of the Cossack National Liberation Movement of Cossackia Nazarenko enjoyed some prominence in New York city area as the organizer of the annual Captive Nations day parade held every July starting in 1960. In 1978, Nazarenko dressed in his colorful Cossack uniform led the Captive Days day parade in New York, and told a journalist: "Cossackia is a nation of 10 million people. In 1923 the Russians officially abolished Cossackia. as a nation. Officially, it no longer exists...America should not spend billions supporting the Soviets with trade. We don't have to be afraid of the Russian army because half of it is made up of Captive Nations. They can never trust the rank and file". After 1991, the idea of a Cossackia was rejected by most Cossacks with a meeting in late 1992 of the 11 atamans representing the 11 Hosts declaring their support for a united Russia.

== Books and articles ==
- Burleigh, Michael (2001). The Third Reich A New History. New York: Hill and Wang. ISBN 080909326X.
- Campbell, John Coert (1965). American Policy Toward Communist Eastern Europe: the Choices Ahead. University of Minnesota Press. ISBN 0-8166-0345-6.
- Longworth, Philip (1970). The Cossacks. Holt, Rinehart and Winston.
- Mueggenberg, Brent (2019). The Cossack Struggle Against Communism, 1917-1945. Jefferson: McFarland. ISBN 978-1476679488.
- Newland, Samuel J. (1991). The Cossacks in the German Army 1941-1945. London: Frank Cass. ISBN 0714681997.
- Simpson, Christopher (1988). Blowback: America's Recruitment of Nazis and Its Effects on the Cold War. New York: Grove Atlantic. ISBN 1555841066.
- Tschebotarioff, Gregory (1964). Russia, My Native Land: A U.S. Engineer Reminisces and Looks at the Present. New York: McGraw-Hill.
