= Pyotr Krasnov =

Russian Cossack general, historian and collaborator (1869–1947)

Ataman Pyotr Krasnov
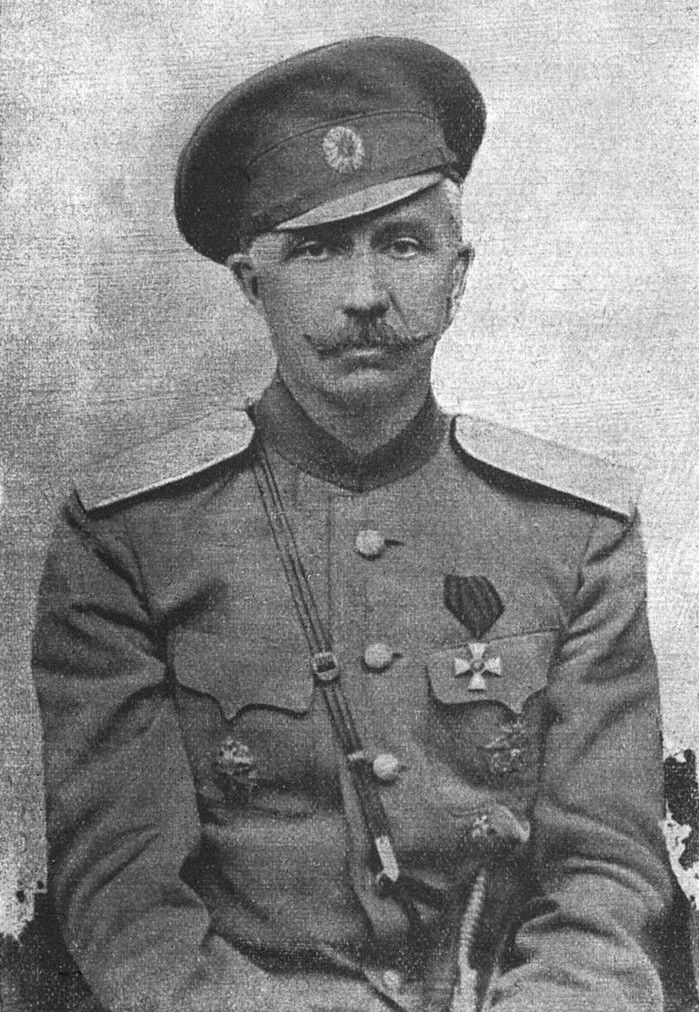
- Krasnov before 1919
- Born: 22 September 1869; Saint Petersburg, Russian Empire
- Died: 16 January 1947 (aged 77); Lefortovo Prison, Moscow, Russian SFSR, Soviet Union
- Cause of death: Execution by hanging
- Military career
- Allegiance: Russian Empire; Don Republic; Nazi Germany
- Branch: Imperial Russian Army; Don Army (White movement); German Army
- Service years: 1888–1945
- Rank: Generalleutnant
- Known for: Cossack collaboration with Nazi Germany
- Conflicts: Russo-Japanese War; World War I Russian Civil War; World War II
- Awards: see awards

Pyotr Nikolayevich Krasnov (Russian: Пётр Николаевич Краснов; 22 September [O.S. 10 September] 1869 – 17 January 1947), also known as Peter Krasnov, was a Russian military leader and writer, who later spearheaded the Cossack collaboration with Nazi Germany.

Krasnov served as a lieutenant general in the Imperial Russian Army during World War I and later led anti-Bolshevik forces during the Russian Civil War, where he served as the ataman of the Don Republic until the Red Army conquered the region following their victory at Tsaritsyn.

After the civil war, he lived in exile. During World War II, Krasnov collaborated with the Germans and served as head of the Main Administration of Cossack Forces within the Reich Ministry for the Occupied Eastern Territories. After surrendering to the British forces in 1945, he was forcibly repatriated to the Soviet Union and subsequently tried in Moscow for high treason and executed in 1947.

== Early life and service ==
Pyotr Krasnov was born on 22 September 1869 (old style: 10 September) in Saint Petersburg, son of lieutenant-general Nikolay Krasnov and grandson to general Ivan Krasnov. In 1888 Krasnov graduated from Pavlovsk Military School and joined the Ataman regiment of the Life Guards of the Imperial Russian Army. Semyon Krasnov was his first cousin once removed.

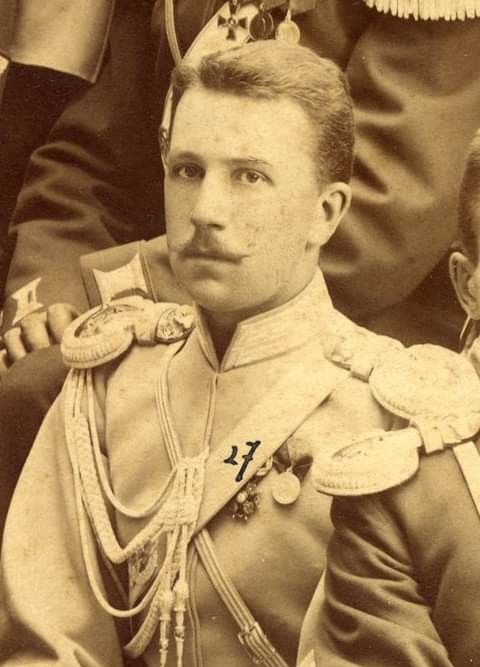
Krasnov in 1896

In April–May 1902, a series of articles were published in Russkii Invalid, the newspaper of the Imperial Russian Army, containing Krasnov's impressions of his trip to Mongolia, China and Japan as the East Asia correspondent of Russkii Invalid. In his article "Fourteen Days in Japan", Krasnov painted the Imperial Japanese Army in a negative light. One staff officer of the Main Staff called Krasnov's article "poorly founded, extraordinarily hasty and far from the truth". Krasnov reported that based on what he had seen in Japan that "the Japanese looks coldly on life and death and does not fear death". He reported that the Japanese soldiers were up to European standards of discipline, but were highly rigid in their conduct of operations and suffered from health problems. Krasnov mockingly noted that during the march on Beijing during the Boxer Rebellion of 1900, exhausted Japanese soldiers had to be carried in the wagons of the Russian Army. Krasnov noted during the assault on the forts at Tianjin that one Japanese company had lost 90% of its men during a frontal assault on a Chinese fort while at the same time a Russian company had taken a Chinese fort by outflanking it, losing only six men killed.

Krasnov felt that the Japanese were brave, but poorly led, declaring "the military deed does not suit the Japanese" as it "was thought up for them by a chauvinist government of complete militarist conviction". About the Japanese infantry, Krasnov wrote the "Japanese soldier is a weak and an indifferent marksman, although amenable to training and able to discharge exactly and well what he has learned, regardless of the cost". Krasnov declared "the language of numbers is not my language", stating though the Japanese could mobilize 400,000 troops in 335 battalions and 104 squadrons with 1,903 artillery guns, they would be little match against "European powers holding excellent positions on the Asian mainland". Krasnov had an equally low opinion of the Japanese cavalry, writing that the Japanese had "neither the horses nor riders to create cavalry". Krasnov declared "to destroy all 13 regiments of the Japanese cavalry would be a very easy task". He concluded that once the Japanese cavalry had been defeated "a deaf and blind Japanese army would become a plaything for an enterprising partisan commander" and "a detachment of 2,000 cavalry easily might tire a Japanese division". Krasnov quoted a Frenchman who lived a decade in Japan as saying: "They are a people gone astray, the military deed is not in their nature", to which Krasnov added "I think that this minute they are contemplating the same thing in St. Petersburg". Though the Main Staff officers deplored Krasnov's article with his sweeping generalizations based upon superficial impressions, the Emperor Nicholas II was said to have read and enjoyed his article while Krasnov's articles about his trip through Asia were turned into a book with a grant from the War Ministry.

== World War I and Revolution ==
During World War I he commanded the 2nd Combined Cossack Division from 1915 to 1917, and in September–October 1917, the 3rd Cavalry Corps. During the Brusilov offensive in the summer of 1916, the 2nd Combined Cossack Division was the first unit to achieve a breakthrough against Austro-Hungarian positions at the Battle of Lutsk, and Krasnov was injured by a bullet to the leg. He was put in command of the 3rd Cavalry Corps in September 1917 after elements of it took part in the Kornilov affair against the Russian Provisional Government. He restored discipline and morale among the 3rd Corps following the Kornilov affair, but initially tried to stay out of politics.

During the October Revolution of 1917, the deposed head of the Russian Provisional Government, Alexander Kerensky appointed Krasnov commander of the 700 Cossacks who marched on Petrograd from Pskov (November [O.S. October] 1917) to suppress the Bolshevik revolt (see Kerensky-Krasnov uprising). These Cossacks were from two regiments of the 1st Don Cossack Division. On 15 November, Bolshevik troops surrounded Gatchina Palace, and took Krasnov prisoner, but he was soon released by Leon Trotsky, whereupon he made his way to the Don.

== Russian Civil War ==
Krasnov fled to the Don region. In May 1918, in Novocherkassk, he won election as the Ataman of the Don Cossack Host. The American historian Richard Pipes described Krasnov as an "opportunist and an adventurer", primarily interested in using the Civil War to advance his own interests. Though the White movement was officially committed to overthrowing the Bolsheviks in order to resume the war with Germany, Krasnov entered negotiations with the Germans who were occupying Ukraine with the aim of securing their support, portraying himself as willing to serve as a pro-German warlord in the Don region, which made him the object of much distrust in the Allied governments. The Germans had set up the Ukrainian Zaporizhian Cossack Hetman Pavlo Skoropadskyi as the puppet leader of Ukraine in April 1918, and Krasnov indicated his willingness to serve as a leader of a set-up similar to the Skoropadskyi regime. Through not willing to formally embrace Cossack separatism, Krasnov as the first elected Ataman of the Don Host for centuries favored more autonomy for the Don Host than the Host had enjoyed in the Imperial period.

With support from Germany, Krasnov equipped his army, which ousted the Soviets from the Don region in May–June 1918. By the middle of June, a Don Army was in the field with 40,000 men, 56 guns and 179 machine-guns. On 11 July 1918 Krasnov wrote a letter to Wilhelm II declaring that the Cossacks had always been friends of the Reich and went on to say:

"The glorious Don Cossacks have been engaging in fighting for their freedom for two months and the fight resulted in their complete victory. The Cossacks have fought with a courage only equaled by that displayed against the English by a people of Germanic stock, the Boers".

Krasnov's relations with the Volunteer Army became strained on account of his pro-German views; furthermore, he was only willing to have the Don Cossacks serve with the Volunteer Army if he was made Supreme Commander-in-Chief of all the White forces, a demand that was rejected by Denikin and the other White generals. As the Don Cossack Host outnumbered the Volunteer Army until the summer of 1919, the Volunteer Army's commander, General Anton Denikin (in office 1918–1920), was at a disadvantage in his negotiations with Krasnov. Members of the White movement generally saw Krasnov as a petty and self-interested warlord, only willing to act if there was something of benefit to him on offer. Throughout the Russian Civil War, the Don Cossack Host kept its own identity, with the Don Cossacks serving under their elected colonels in their own regiments, apart from the rest of the White armies. Krasnov wanted Denikin to advance on and take the city of Tsaritsyn (modern Volgograd) on the Volga to end the possibility of the Soviet Red Army entering the Don region, a demand that Denikin opposed. Krasnov so desperately wanted to secure Tsaritsyn that he even offered to have Don Cossacks temporarily serve under Denikin's command if he was willing to advance on Tsaritsyn, but Denikin had other plans.

Viewing Krasnov as unreliable and untrustworthy, Denikin instead decided to launch the Second Kuban Campaign of June–November 1918, taking his army south to the territory of the Kuban Cossack Host to raise more men and to take on the Red North Caucasian Army before turning north towards Moscow. Moscow became the Soviet capital in March 1918, as Lenin had decided that Petrograd (modern Saint Petersburg) was too exposed to the German Army, which had occupied what is now the Baltic states. Denikin viewed the Kuban Cossacks as more willing to help than Krasnov and his Don Cossacks, who tended to put their own interests first. General Vyacheslav Naumenko, the field ataman of the Kuban Host, was known to be more willing to work with the White generals. Denikin also believed that he needed to liquidate the 70,000-strong Red North Caucasian Army first before advancing on Moscow, arguing that an advance on Moscow would be impossible with a threat to his rear. Denikin's decision to turn the Volunteer Army south to the Kuban rather than north to Moscow became one of the most controversial of the Russian Civil War – by not advancing north in 1918 Denikin missed his best chance of linking up with the White forces in Siberia under Admiral Alexander Kolchak, who were advancing west along the Trans-Siberian Railway in the direction of Moscow.

In the second half of 1918, Krasnov advanced towards Povorino-Kamyshin-Tsaritsyn, intending to march on Moscow on his own, but was defeated. In the siege of Tsaritsyn in November–December 1918, Krasnov sent his Cossacks repeatedly to storm Tsaritsyn, only to see them cut down by Red machine-gun and artillery fire. Following his defeat at Tsaritsyn, Krasnov returned to the territory of the Don Cossack Host and refused all offers to co-ordinate with Denikin unless he was made Supreme Commander-in-Chief of the Whites first. After Germany's defeat (November 1918) in World War I, Krasnov set his sights on the Entente powers in his search for allies. Under the terms of the armistice of 11 November 1918 ending World War One, Germany was required to pull out its forces out of all the territory gained by the Treaty of Brest-Litovsk.

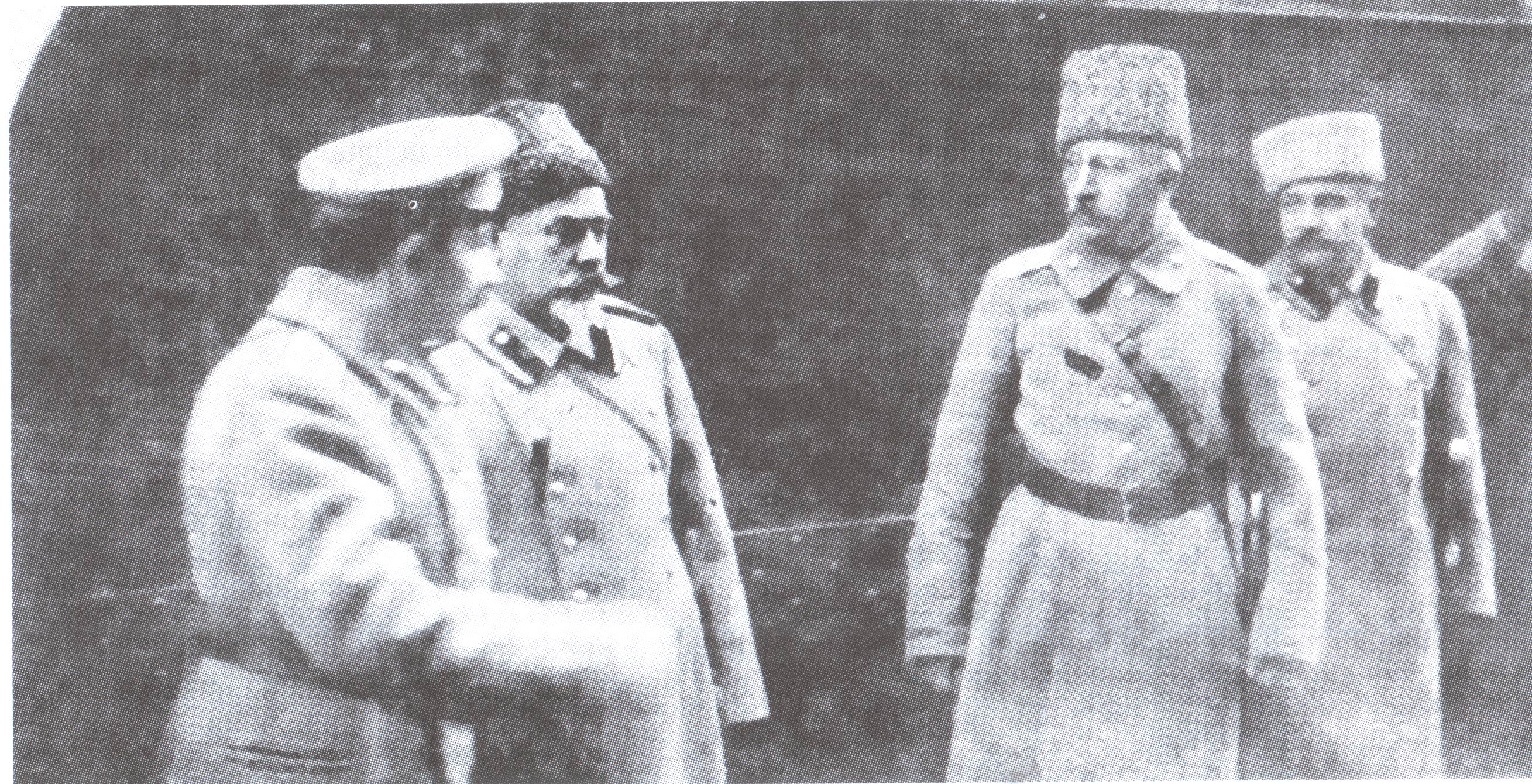
Krasnov with general Anton Denikin in February 1919

The defeat of the Ottoman Empire in October 1918 allowed British, French, and American naval forces to enter the Black Sea and for the first time allowed direct contact between the Allies and the Whites. Krasnov appealed to the French, offering to allow them to establish a protectorate over the Don Host in an effort to sow discord between the Allies as the territory of the Don Host had been assigned beforehand during discussions among Allied leaders to the British sphere of operations. However, Krasnov was informed by Allied diplomats that the Allies would not supply him with arms, arms would be supplied only to the Volunteer Army, which would then pass on arms to the Don Cossack Host if necessary. In January 1919 Krasnov was forced by the Allied arms embargo against the Don Host to acknowledge General Denikin's authority over the White movement, despite his animosity towards Denikin.

Krasnov was an organizer of the White Terror in the Don Province; his troops executed between 25,000 and 40,000 people.

== Exile in France and Germany ==
On 19 February 1919, Krasnov fled to Western Europe after losing the election for the office of Don Ataman. He was succeeded by Afrikan P. Bogaewsky. Arriving first in Germany, he moved to France in 1923, where he continued his anti-Soviet activities. In France, Krasnov was one of the founders of the Brotherhood of Russian Truth, an anti-communist organization with an underground network in Russia.

In exile, Krasnov wrote memoirs and several novels. His famous trilogy Ot Dvuglavogo Orla k krasnomu znameni (From Double Eagle to the Red Flag), in addition to the main plot, with its hero, General Sablin, has several sub-plots which encompass many places, events, and personages from the time of the Revolution of 1905 to the Russian Civil War. It presents a vast panorama of the Revolution and the Civil War throughout the country. Events are revealed through the fates of many characters, who, in turn, give their own interpretations of the events. Even the revolutionaries have an opportunity to express their views, although, in general, their political expositions seem to be the weakest parts of the novel. The ideology of the book is thus presented polyphonically. The author, although he tends to align himself with his conservative characters, offers no personal opinion of his own. All major themes, such as authority vs. anarchy, respect for human dignity vs. violence, creative work vs. destruction, as well as cruelty and terror, are treated in this polyphonic manner. Krasnov had begun writing From Double Eagle to the Red Flag when he was in prison in 1917, but the novel was first published in Russian in Berlin in 1921. The American historian Brent Muggenberg wrote that Krasnov had "an impressive grasp of the motivations and mentalities" on both sides in the Russian Civil War. The German historian Daniel Siemens described From Double Eagle to the Red Flag as a deeply antisemitic book that accepted The Protocols of the Learned Elders of Zion as genuine and accused "international Jewry" of inventing Communism. Siemens noted that the German translation of Ot Dvuglavogo Orla k krasnomu znameni was the favorite book of the Nazi martyr Horst Wessel. Other books written by Krasnov included a historical novel about a group of Don Cossacks resisting the French invasion of Russia in 1812 and another historical novel about Yermak Timofeyevich, the legendary 16th century Cossack conqueror of Siberia. Krasnov's novels were translated into English, German, French, Serbian and other European languages. Despite his chequered military record, Krasnov was seen within émigré circles as a "legendary hero of the Civil War".

Another of Krasnov's novels was his 1927 work Za chertopolokhom (Behind the Thistle), a future history set in the 1990s that imagined a post-Communist Russia ruled over by a restored monarchy that had built an enormous wall around the entire empire to prevent any and all contact with the West. Though set in the future, the emperor who has chosen to isolate Russia from the West bears a strong resemblance in both appearance and personality to Ivan the Terrible. The novel begins with the Soviet Union launching an invasion of Eastern Europe sometime in the 1930s, which was to be started by an unleashing of an immense quantity of poisonous gases. However, the Soviet Air Force accidentally unleashed the deadly chemical gases on the Red Army, killing millions while setting off forest fires. The masses of corpses lead to an outbreak of plague, which rendered the borderlands of the Soviet Union uninhabitable for decades and led to a monstrous thistle standing several feet high growing up to in the borderlands. After the disaster, the rest of the world assumes that there is no life left behind the thistle.

In Krasnov's future history, in Europe, socialist parties have come to power in all of the European nations, leading to an irrevocable economic decline over the course of the 20th century. By the 1990s as a result of decades of socialism, in all the European states food is being severely rationed, technological advances have ceased, housing is in short supply and the triumph of avant-garde has led to a cultural collapse. Disenchanted with life in a declining Europe, a hardy group of the descendants of Russian émigrés who have managed to keep the Russian language and culture led by a man named Korenev climb over the thistle to see what lies behind it. Korenev has a dream featuring a beautiful girl threatened by the zmei gorynych, the gigantic, monstrous three-headed dragon of Russian mythology. The girl represents Russia while the zmei gorynych represents the West whose individualistic ideology that Krasnov portrayed as antithetical to Russian values. Korenev and his companions discover that in the world "behind the thistle" that the Communist regime was overthrown decades ago and was replaced with a restored monarchy. The restored monarchy has brought a return to the dress and culture of the era before the Emperor Peter the Great with the men growing long beards and wearing modified traditional costumes while the women wear the traditional sarafans and keep their hair in long braids. The ideology of the regime is based on the Official Nationality ideology of the Emperor Nicholas I, namely the triad of Orthodoxy, Autocracy, and Nationality while the only political party allowed is "The Family of Russian Brothers and Sisters in the name of God and the Tsar". Jews are allowed a place in Krasnov's utopia, but "they no longer have the power to rule over us nor can they hide under false Russian names to infiltrate the government". All of the Russian characters "behind the thistle" speak in a pseudo-folksy way meant to evoke the Russian of the 16th and 17th centuries, which is portrayed as a more "authentic" Russian than modern Russian.

In contrast to the declining economies of the socialist West, the Russia that Krasnov imagines under the restored monarchy is economically and culturally flourishing while achieving marvelous technological feats such as building a sort of flying railroad system over the entire country and constructing vast canals that turn deserts into farmland. Every home in Russia has a television, which only airs the emperor's daily speech to his subjects. Every subject has a personal library in their home consisting of traditional books such as dream-readers, patriotic poetry, folk tales and the Bible. However, the regime allows no freedom of expression and one of the returning émigrés says: "Some might say that the Russian government is now totalitarian, only this is not the same sort of totalitarianism as that of the Communists and the Masons of the West. They bow down to some invisible force, whose aim is destruction, but our society is founded on the bedrock of family and at its head is the Tsar, blessed by God, a man whose thoughts are only about the prosperity of Russia". The social order is enforced by the public floggings, torture and execution of any Russians who dare to think differently, and those who speak out "return home with black stumps in place of their tongues". The narrator of the novel agrees that despite the use of extreme violence and cruelty by the restored Tsarist regime that the system that exists in Russia is superior to the "rotting democratic West". The narrator of Behind the Thistle praises extreme violence committed by the state as not canceling out freedom, but rather "is indeed true freedom, a freedom that democratic Europe had never known or experienced–a freedom for good deeds that goes hand in hand with oppression against evil".

Krasnov was an Eurasianist, an ideology that saw Russia as an Asian nation, having more in common with other Asian nations such as China, Mongolia, and Japan rather than with the Western nations. Some aspects of the novel such as its nostalgia for the pre-Peterine Russia have led to Krasnov being misidentified as a Slavophile, but he was opposed to the ideology of the Slavophiles, arguing that Russia had little in common with other Slavic nations such as Poland, Yugoslavia, Bulgaria, and Czechoslovakia. In common with other Eurasianists, Krasnov believed that Russians had a natural affinity with the peoples of Asia, and in Behind the Thistle Russia has extremely friendly relations with other Asian nations such as China, Mongolia and India (through India was part of the British Empire in 1927, Krasnov assumed India would be independent by the 1990s). Krasnov favored Asian values with the focus of putting the collective ahead of the individual, and for this reason, argued that Russia was an Asian nation that should look east towards other Asian nations instead of looking west. Unlike other Eurasianists who saw the Soviet Union as a "stepping stone" towards the development of a Eurasianist Russia, Krasnov's anti-communism led to the rejection of the "stepping stone thesis". In the 1920s–1930s, Krasnov was a popular novelist with his books being translated into 20 languages. Behind the Thistle, however, met with an overwhelmingly negative critical response in 1927, being panned by reviewers in the majority of Russian émigré journals who called Behind the Thistle badly written, unrealistic and preachy. Despite the negative reviews, the expression "behind the thistle" became popular with the younger Russian émigrés as a way describe the Soviet Union.

During the Berne Trial of 1933–35, started when a Swiss Jewish group sued a Swiss Nazi group, Krasnov was asked by his fellow emigre Nikolai Markov to come to Berne to testify for the defendants about the alleged authenticity of The Protocols of the Learned Elders of Zion, but he declined. Markov in turn was a member of the Welt-Dienst, an international antisemitic society based in Erfurt, Germany and headed by a former German Army officer, Ulrich Fleischhauer, whose efforts to promote The Protocols of the Learned Elders of Zion in Switzerland had caused the lawsuit in Berne. In his correspondence with Markov, Krasnov affirmed his belief in the authenticity of The Protocols of the Learned Elders of Zion, but stated he was unwilling to be grilled by the lawyers for the plaintiffs.

In 1937, after several Russian White emigre leaders in Paris had been assassinated by the Soviet NKVD, Krasnov moved to Berlin where he believed he would be safer, and declared his support for the Third Reich. In another of his novels, The Lie in 1939, Krasnov wrote about one character: "Lisa was right in her severe judgment: Russia was no more. She did not have a Motherland or her own. However, when the Bremen floated noiselessly by and she saw a black swastika in a white circle on a scarlet banner, a sign of eternal motion and continuum, she was feeling a warm tide covering her heart...That's Motherland!"

== World War II collaboration ==
During World War II, Krasnov continued his "German orientation" by seeking an alliance with Nazi Germany. A major motivation on his part was the repression of the Cossacks and the Russian Orthodox Church by the Soviet government. Upon hearing of the launching of Operation Barbarossa on 22 June 1941, Krasnov immediately issued a statement of support for the "crusade against Judeo-Bolshevism" and declared:

"I wish to state to all Cossacks that this is not a war against Russia, but against Communists, Jews and their minions who trade in Russian blood. May God help the German sword and Hitler! Let them accomplish their endeavor, similar to what the Russians and Emperor Alexander I did for Prussia in 1813."

By all accounts, Krasnov was extremely elated when he heard of Operation Barbarossa and believing it to be the beginning of the end of the Soviet Union and the "liberation of Russia from Judeo-Bolshevism". Krasnov contacted Joseph Goebbels, the German Minister of Propaganda, and asked for permission to speak on Radio Berlin's Russian language broadcasts to deliver pro-Nazi speeches, which was granted. From late June 1941 onward, Krasnov was a regular speaker on Radio Berlin's Russian-language station and delivered very antisemitic speeches that portrayed the Soviet government as the rule of "Judeo-Bolsheviks" and the German forces advancing into the Soviet Union as liberators. Krasnov came into contact with officials of the Reich Ministry for the Occupied Eastern Territories headed by Alfred Rosenberg, the Baltic German émigré intellectual who besides being the "official philosopher" of the NSDAP was considered to be the resident Nazi expert on the Soviet Union.

In January 1943, Rosenberg appointed Krasnov to head the Cossack Central Office of the Reich Ministry for the Occupied Eastern Territories, making him the point man for the ministry in its dealings with the Cossacks. The previous head of the Cossack Central Office, Nikolaus Himpel, who was a Baltic German like Rosenberg, had failed to inspire many Cossacks to join the German war effort. Just as Rosenberg, Himpel was fluent in Russian but spoke it with a pronounced German accent, which made him a figure of distrust to the Cossacks. Rosenberg realized that he needed a leader who was a Cossack himself to inspire more recruitment and turned to Krasnov after it was discovered that his first choice, the Prague-based Cossack separatist leader Vasily Glazkov, had no following. Krasnov was aged and had to walk with a cane, but he was known for his political skills. Though "not universally popular", he was relatively well respected amongst the Cossacks as a former ataman of the Don Cossack Host and as a popular novelist. The Don Host was the largest and oldest of the 11 Hosts, which gave him a certain prestige as a former Don Host ataman. He managed to avoid for the most part the feuds that characterized the Russian diaspora, which made him an acceptable leader. He agreed to organise and head Cossack units out of White emigres and Soviet (mostly Cossack) prisoners of war, to be armed by the Nazis. The Nazis, in turn, expected Krasnov to follow their political line and to keep to a separatist Cossack orientation. Krasnov, who considered himself a Russian first and a Cossack second, was not in sympathy with Rosenberg's notion of establishing a Nazi puppet state to be called "Cossackia" in southeastern Russia. Rosenberg favoured an approach that he called "political warfare" to "free the German Reich from Pan-Slavic pressure for centuries to come". Rosenberg envisioned breaking up the Soviet Union into four puppet states and added Cossackia as the fifth puppet state in 1942.

In September 1943, the soldiers of the newly formed 1st SS Cossack Cavalry Division learned that their division would not, as expected, be sent to fight on the Eastern Front, but would go to the Balkans to fight communist partisans. At the request of the division's commander, General Helmuth von Pannwitz, Krasnov travelled to address the division. Krasnov tried to assuage the wounded feelings of the Cossacks, who did not want to go to the Balkans, by assuring them that the fight against the Partisans was part of the same struggle against "the international Communist conspiracy" on the Eastern Front, and he promised them if they did well in the Balkans, they would ultimately go to the Eastern Front.

On 31 March 1944, Rosenberg created a "government-in-exile" in Berlin for Cossackia headed by Krasnov, who, in turn, appointed ataman Naumenko of the Kuban Host as his "minister of war". The "government-in-exile" was recognized only by Germany. At a meeting with the Cossack separatist Vasily Glazkov in Berlin in July 1944, Krasnov stated that he did not agree with Glazkov's separatism but was forced under pressure from Rosenberg to appoint three supporters of Cossackia to important positions in the Cossack Central Office. In November 1944, Krasnov refused the appeal of General Andrey Vlasov to join the latter's Russian Liberation Army. Krasnov disliked Vlasov as a former Red Army general, who had defected after his capture in 1942 and because as an old man, he was unwilling to submit to take orders from a much younger man. In addition to this, Krasnov demanded that Vlasov gave a guarantee that in the future Cossacks would receive all the rights they had under the tsarist government, and never reached any agreement with his movement despite all of Vlasov's efforts.

On 15 February 1945 he moved with his wife to Carnia, Italy, where he substituted Timofey Domanov in the rule of the government of Kosakenland's Cossack government. He would live in the local Savoy Hotel up until the fall of the military state. When Krasnov had moved to Carnia, Vyacheslav Naumenko served as the acting director of the Main Directorate of Cossack Forces in Berlin. Vlasov tried to pursue a military takeover of the forces stationed in Carnia to repurpose them in the Committee by using Naumenko's ataman status as leverage. Krasnov deemed Naumenko's orders as invalid by putting into question his ataman status, and a diplomatic crisis ensued up until 27 March 1945, when Vlasov gave up in his attempts. After a meeting with Vlasov on 27 April 1945, a decision by Krasnov was made, which led to the evacuation of Kosakenland, with the Cossacks fully retreating on 3 May 1945, one day after the Battle of Ovaro. At the end of the war, Krasnov and his men surrendered to British forces in Austria on 9 May 1945. On 28 May 1945, the Cossacks were told to get onto British vehicles with the pretext of a meeting with the British higher command in Judenburg, they were instead sent to the Soviets.

== Repatriation and execution ==
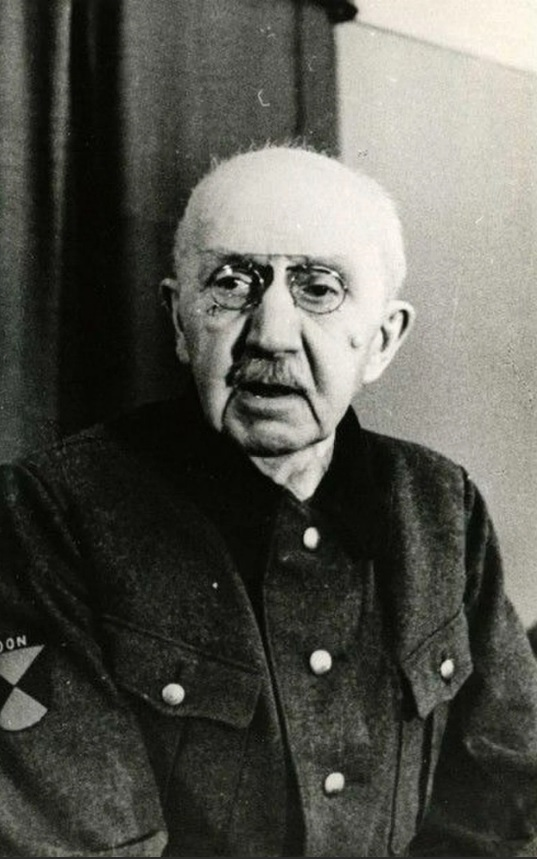
Krasnov in court during his trial

On 28 May 1945, Pyotr Krasnov was handed over to the Soviets by the British authorities as part of the program to repatriate Cossacks who had collaborated with Nazi Germany to the Soviet Union after World War II. The broken British promise, not to hand Krasnov over to the Soviet authorities, was influenced by the then-undetected Soviet spy in MI6, Kim Philby, who knew about Krasnov's broken promise to the Soviet government back in late 1917, that he would not take up arms against the new regime in return for being released from prison. Krasnov was taken to Moscow and held in the Lubyanka prison. He was charged with various crimes: for working for Nazi Germany in World War II and for "White Guardist units" in the Russian Civil War. He was sentenced to death by the Military Collegium of the Supreme Court of the Soviet Union, together with General Andrei Shkuro, who was another former White movement general, and Timofey Domanov, and Helmuth von Pannwitz. On 17 January 1947, he was hanged. The article in Pravda that announced his execution stated he had made a guilty plea to all charges; however, this claim is impossible to verify as his trial was not public.

== Legacy ==
In 1994, a monument was erected in Moscow on the territory of the Church of All Saints, dedicated to the memory of "von Pannwitz, A. G. Shkuro, P. N. Krasnov, Sultan Klych-Girey, T. N. Domanov, and other Russian soldiers, the Russian Corps, the Cossack camp, the Cossacks of the 15th SS Cossack Cavalry Corps, who fell for faith and Fatherland". On 8 May 2007, the marble slab was broken. A criminal case was even initiated on this fact under the article "vandalism". The rector of the church, Archpriest Vasily Baburin, noted that this plate has nothing to do with the Church of All Saints: "We ourselves would be happy to move this slab, because we do not want to participate in any political battles. The slab was installed at the end of the last century, but now the temple has nothing to do with it".

In 2014, on the occasion of the 100th anniversary of the outbreak of the First World War, a new plate "To the Cossacks who fell for the Faith, the Tsar and the Fatherland" was installed on the site of the broken plate. A memorial plaque to the generals of the Russian Imperial Army, including P. N. Krasnov, has been preserved nearby, but instead of the name of Krasnov (like A. G. Shkuro), the names of generals of the Russian Imperial Army, heroes of the First World War N. M. Remezov and P. A. Pleve are indicated on the plate.

=== Former private monument in Yelanskaya, Rostov Oblast ===
External image
- Krasnov statue at the Yelansky Cossack Museum and Memorial Complex. It was dismantled in 2025.

On August 4, 2006, in the village of Yelanskaya in the Sholokhovsky district of the Rostov region, on the territory of a private house, a solemn opening of a memorial complex dedicated to the memory of the Don Cossacks who died in the struggle against Soviet power, including those who fought on the side of Hitler, took place. In the center of the memorial is a large bronze figure of the last ataman of the Don army, Pyotr Krasnov.

On July 30, 2008, the Prosecutor's office of the Sholokhovsky district, at the request of State Duma deputy N. V. Kolomeitsev, initiated an administrative case on the installation of this monument. According to the prosecutor's office, the reason for the demolition of the monument is that these sculptural objects are real estate objects and their installation requires permission, as well as the fact that this memorial praises the manifestation of fascism.

In 2017, on the eve of the 74th anniversary of the liberation of Rostov-on-Don from the German occupation, activists of the organization "Essence of Time" petitioned the executive and legislative authorities of the Russian Federation, demanding to dismantle the monument to Krasnov as an accomplice of the Third Reich and to stop schoolchildren from familiarizing themselves with the memorial dedicated to the Cossack collaborators.

the April 2024, the museum was raided by the Federal Security Service and artefacts relating to collaborators Krasnov, Sergei Pavlov and Helmuth von Pannwitz were seized.

In April 2025, the monument was dismantled and confiscated on police order. The owner of the private complex in which it was placed, Vladimir Melikhov was additionally fined for "production and distribution of extremist content."

=== Unsuccessful attempts of rehabilitation in modern Russia ===
Nationalist and monarchist organizations, both in Russia and abroad, have repeatedly appealed to Russian state bodies with requests for the rehabilitation of individual Russian collaborators.

In accordance with the conclusions of the Main Military Prosecutor's Office on the refusal to rehabilitate them, the definitions of the Military Collegium of the Supreme Court of the Russian Federation dated December 25, 1997, German citizens Krasnov P. N., Shkuro A. G., Sultan Klych-Girey, Krasnov S. N. and USSR citizen Domanov T. N. were recognized as reasonably convicted and not subject to rehabilitation, about which all initiators of appeals on the issue of rehabilitation of these persons have been notified.

Nevertheless, on January 17, 2008, ataman of the Don Cossacks, State Duma deputy from the ruling United Russia Viktor Vodolatsky signed a decree on the creation of a working group for the rehabilitation of Pyotr Krasnov in connection with a request from the organization "Cossack Abroad". On January 28, 2008, the Council of atamans of the organization "The Great Army of the Don" adopted a decision in which it was noted: "... historical facts indicate that an active fighter against the Bolsheviks during the Civil War, writer and publicist P. N. Krasnov collaborated with fascist Germany during the Great Patriotic War. <...> Attaching exceptional importance to the above, the Council of Atamans decided: to refuse the petition to the non-profit foundation "Cossack Abroad" in resolving the issue of political rehabilitation of P. N. Krasnov". Viktor Vodolatsky himself stressed: "the fact of his cooperation with Hitler during the war makes the idea of his rehabilitation completely unacceptable to us". The initiative for rehabilitation was condemned by veterans of the Great Patriotic War and representatives of the Russian Orthodox Church.

== Honours and awards ==
- Cross of St. George 4th class
- Order of St Vladimir, 4th class
- Order of St Vladimir, 3rd class
- Order of St. Anne 3rd class
- Order of St. Anne 2nd class
- Order of St. Stanislaus 3rd class
- Order of St. Stanislaus 2nd class
- Golden Sword of St George
- Order of the Star of Ethiopia (Ethiopian Empire)

== See also ==
- Repatriation of Cossacks after World War II
- Miguel Krassnoff
- Kosakenland

== Writings ==
- From Double Eagle To Red Flag.. New York, Duffield and Company, 1926. 2 vols.
- The Unforgiven. New York, Duffield and Company, 1928. 444 p.
- The Amazon of the Desert. Trans. by Olga Vitali and Vera Brooke. New York, Duffield, 1929. 272 p.
- Napoleon And The Cossacks. 1931.
- Largo: A Novel. New York, Duffield and Green, 1932. 599 p.
