= Fyodor Eduardovich Keller =

Russian general (1850–1904)

Graf Fyodor Eduardovich Keller
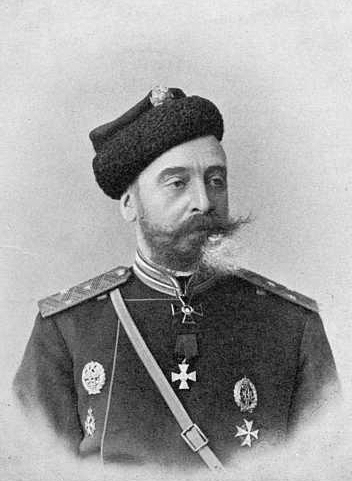
- General Keller
- Born: 15 August 1850; Moscow, Moscow Governorate, Russian Empire
- Died: 31 July 1904 (aged 53) near Montien Pass, Liaodong Peninsula, Manchuria
- Other name: Theodor Eduard von Keller
- Military career
- Allegiance: Russian Empire
- Branch: Imperial Russian Army
- Service years: 1866–1904
- Rank: Lieutenant General
- Conflicts: Serbian-Turkish Wars; Russo-Turkish War; Russo-Japanese War

Theodor Eduard Graf von Keller (Russian: Фёдор Эдуа́рдович Ке́ллер, Fyodor Eduardovich Keller; 15 August 1850 – 31 July 1904), better known as Fyodor Keller, was a general in the Imperial Russian Army, noted for his role in the Battle of Motien Pass during the Russo-Japanese War.

== Biography ==
Theodor von Keller was from German nobility, and had the title of a Prussian count. His father was Eduard Graf von Keller (1819–1903), who would become an Imperial Russian chamberlain, privy councilor, and senator. His grandfather Theodor Ludwig Wilhelm Graf von Keller (1791–1860), who would become a colonel of the Imperial Russian army, was born in Stedten and had moved to Russia, where his father Dorotheus Ludwig Christoph Graf von Keller (1757–1827), like so many Germans, had been offered a high position and wealth from Catherine the Great.

Young Theodor, who the Russians called Fyodor/Fedor, attended the prestigious Corps of Pages, the military school for the Russian aristocracy. After graduation in 1866, he was commissioned as an ensign in the premier cavalry regiment of the Imperial Russian Army, the Chevalier Guard Regiment. He then attended the Nicholas General Staff Academy and was promoted to captain on his graduation in 1876. His cousin Theodor Alexander Graf von Keller (1857–1918) would later become a famous General der Kavallerie of the Imperial Russian Army.

=== The Balkan campaigns ===
Also in 1876, Keller volunteered for service with the Serbian Army during the Serbian-Turkish Wars (1876-1878) and was promoted to the rank of lieutenant colonel and distinguished himself in a number of combat operations. In September of the same year, he became a member of the staff of Major-General Mikhail Chernyayev (nicknamed the 'Russian General Custer'), and was assigned as aide-de-camp to the tsarevich Alexander Alexandrovich (the future Tsar Alexander III) and the Field Marshal Prince Aleksandr Baryatinsky, both of whom were in Serbia serving with the Russian volunteer expeditionary force.

The forces of Ottoman Empire defeated the Russian-backed Serbians, thus leading to the subsequent Russo-Turkish War, 1877–1878. During this war, Keller served as the Chief-of-Staff to the Russian-led Bulgarian militia, and later as chief-of-staff for Russian Major-General Mikhail Skobelev, where he replaced the wounded Colonel Alexei Kuropatkin. After the war, Keller was promoted to colonel and served in various staff positions. At the conclusion of the war in 1879, he was promoted to colonel and designated an official emissary to Constantinople for the negotiations which determined the borders of the Kingdom of Bulgaria.

After his return to Russia, in 1882, Keller received command of the 4th Life Guard Rifle Battalion of the Imperial Guard. He was promoted to major-general in 1890 and in 1893 he was selected by Tsar Alexander III to serve as the director of the Corps of Pages. He held this prestigious post until 1900, when, after promotion to lieutenant-general, he became Governor of Yekaterinoslav.

=== The Russo-Japanese War ===
At the start of the Russo-Japanese War in 1904, Keller volunteered for a combat command, one of the few senior Russian officers to do so. His request was approved and he was placed at the disposal of the Minister of War, General Kuropatkin. Keller initially served as Intelligence Officer on Kuropatkin's staff in Manchuria. After the Russian defeat at the Battle of the Yalu on 1 May, General Kuropatkin decided Keller would replace Lieutenant-General Mikhail Zasulich as commander of the Eastern Detachment of the 2nd Siberian Corps.

Keller's leadership skills quickly made a difference in restoring the confidence of the soldiers who had been severely mauled by General Kuroki Tamemoto's 1st Japanese Army. During the next month, the Eastern Detachment marched hundreds of miles, but did little fighting. Motien Pass, a strong defensive position, was abandoned by Keller on 26 May due to many factors not under his control. Several small operations followed over the next two months, but with limited scope.

On 31 July, Keller established a strong defensive position north of Motien Pass to block the Japanese advance on Liaoyang. The Japanese IJA 2nd Division and Guards Divisions attacked all day, but were unable to break the Russian defense. In the late afternoon, the Japanese were surprised to see the Russians withdrawing from their positions. Later that evening, Chinese civilians informed the Japanese that Keller had been killed by Japanese artillery fire at about 14:00 that day.

While Keller lacked experience in the handling large bodies of troops, he was highly respected within the Imperial Russian Army as an aggressive leader, a quality lacking in many Russian senior leaders during the war. His death was compared to the earlier loss of Admiral Stepan Makarov. His grave is at the Keller family estate outside of Moscow.

== Honors ==
- Order of St Vladimir 4th class with swords, 1877
- Order of St. Stanislaus 2nd class 1877
- Order of St. George, 4th class, 1878
- Order of the Cross of Takovo
