= Fyodor Arturovich Keller =

Russian general (1857–1918)

Graf Fyodor Arturovich Keller
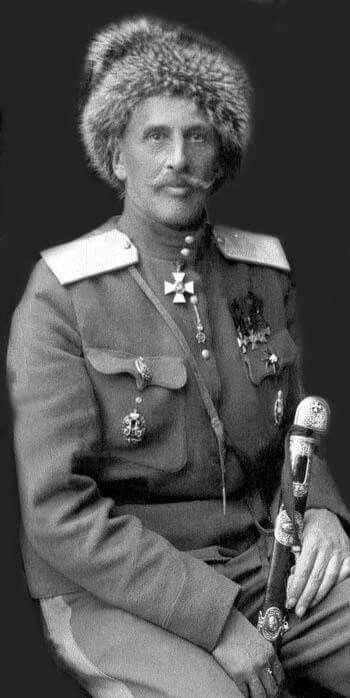
- General Keller
- Born: 24 October [O.S. 12 October] 1857; Kursk, Russian Empire
- Died: 21 December 1918 (aged 61); Kiev, Ukrainian People's Republic
- Cause of death: Execution by firing squad
- Military career
- Allegiance: Russian Empire
- Branch: Imperial Russian Army
- Service years: 1878–1918
- Rank: General of the cavalry
- Conflicts: Russo-Turkish War; World War I

Signature
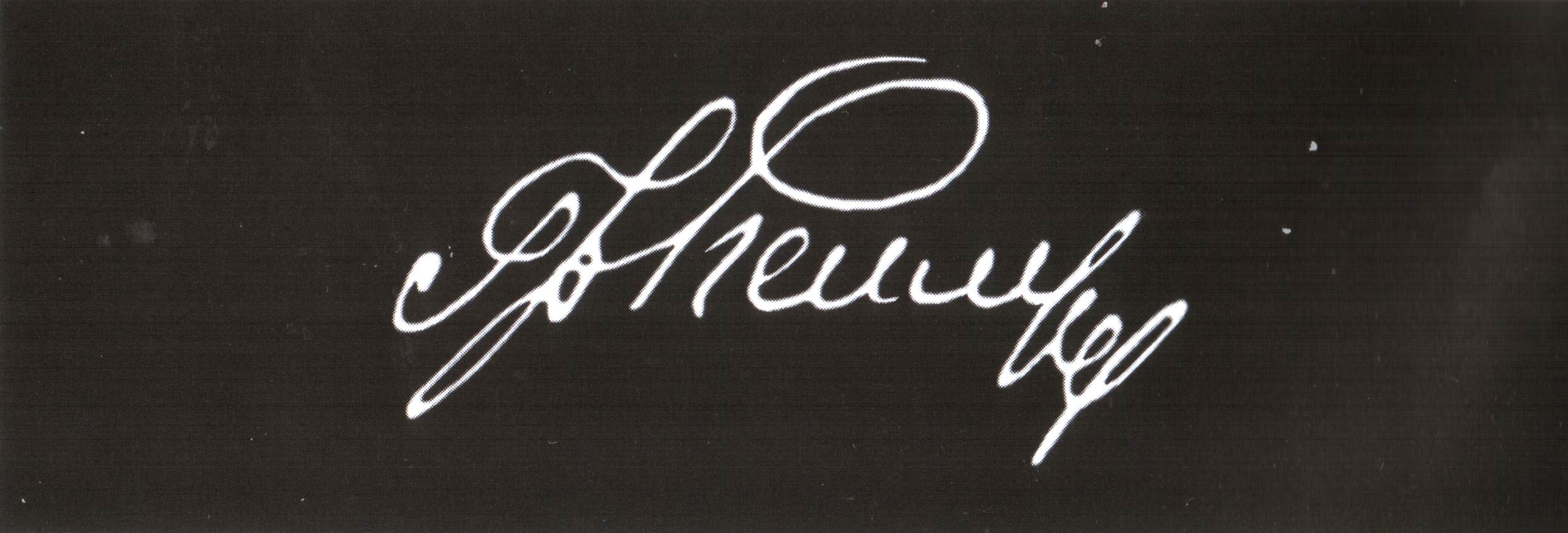

Count Fyodor Arturovich Keller (Russian: Фёдор Артурович Келлер; German: Theodor Alexander Graf von Keller; 24 October [O.S. 12 October] 1857 – 21 December 1918) was a Russian General of the cavalry, one of the leaders of the White movement in 1918, and a monarchist.

== Military career ==
Fyodor Arturovich Keller was born in Kursk, to the family of ethnic German General Artur Fyodorovich Keller. He was a cousin of Fyodor Eduardovich Keller, who distinguished himself in the Russo-Japanese War.

Fyodor Keller studied at the preparatory boarding school of the Nikolaev Cavalry School and passed the entrance exam for the Tver Cavalry Cadet School in 1878. However, after the outbreak of the Russo-Turkish War of 1877–1878, he volunteered for combat and was awarded the 1st and 2nd Class Crosses of St. George for bravery.

After the war, he served in the 1st Leib Dragoon Moscow Regiment. He ascended ranks and on 16 February 1904, he was appointed the commander of the 15th Alexander Dragoon Regiment in Kiev.

From June 1906 he was the commander of the Leib Guards Dragoon Regiment. In 1907, he was awarded the rank of Fliegel-Adjutant and in July of the same year, he was promoted to major general with enrollment in H. I. M. Retinue.

During the First Russian Revolution between 1905 and 1907, he acted as a provisional Governor-General of Kalisz, and survived two assassination attempts. The first attempt failed when Keller managed to catch a bomb thrown at his carriage, and it failed to explode. In the second attempt, Keller received multiple shrapnel wounds, when a bomb exploded beneath his horse.

On 14 June 1910 he was appointed commander of the 1st brigade of the Caucasus Cavalry Division, and on 25 February 1912 commander of the 10th Cavalry Division. On 31 May 1913 he received the rank of lieutenant general.

When World War I broke out, Keller’s division became part of the 3rd Army of General Nikolai Ruzsky. On August 21, 1914, commanding the 10th Cavalry Division, he defeated the Austria-Hungary 4th Cavalry Division in the Battle of Jaroslawice, described as the last massive cavalry engagement. During the Battle of Galicia, he organized the pursuit of the enemy and took 500 prisoners and 6 guns near Yavoriv. For services in battle, he was awarded the Order of St. George of the 4th (September 1914) and 3rd (May 1915) degrees.

From April 3, 1915, he was the commander of the 3rd Cavalry Corps. During the offensive at the end of April 1915, he distinguished himself with a successful cavalry attack at Balamutivka and Rzhavyntsi, breaking through Austrian fortifications, taking strategically important heights and many prisoners.

During the general offensive of the Southwestern Front in Bukovina in 1916, Keller's corps was part of the 9th Army of General Platon Lechitsky. In early June, Keller's corps, together with the corps of General Mikhail Promtov was ordered to pursue the retreating southern group of the 7th Austro-Hungarian Army. He was conferred the rank of General of the cavalry on 15 January 1917.

== Revolution and civil war ==
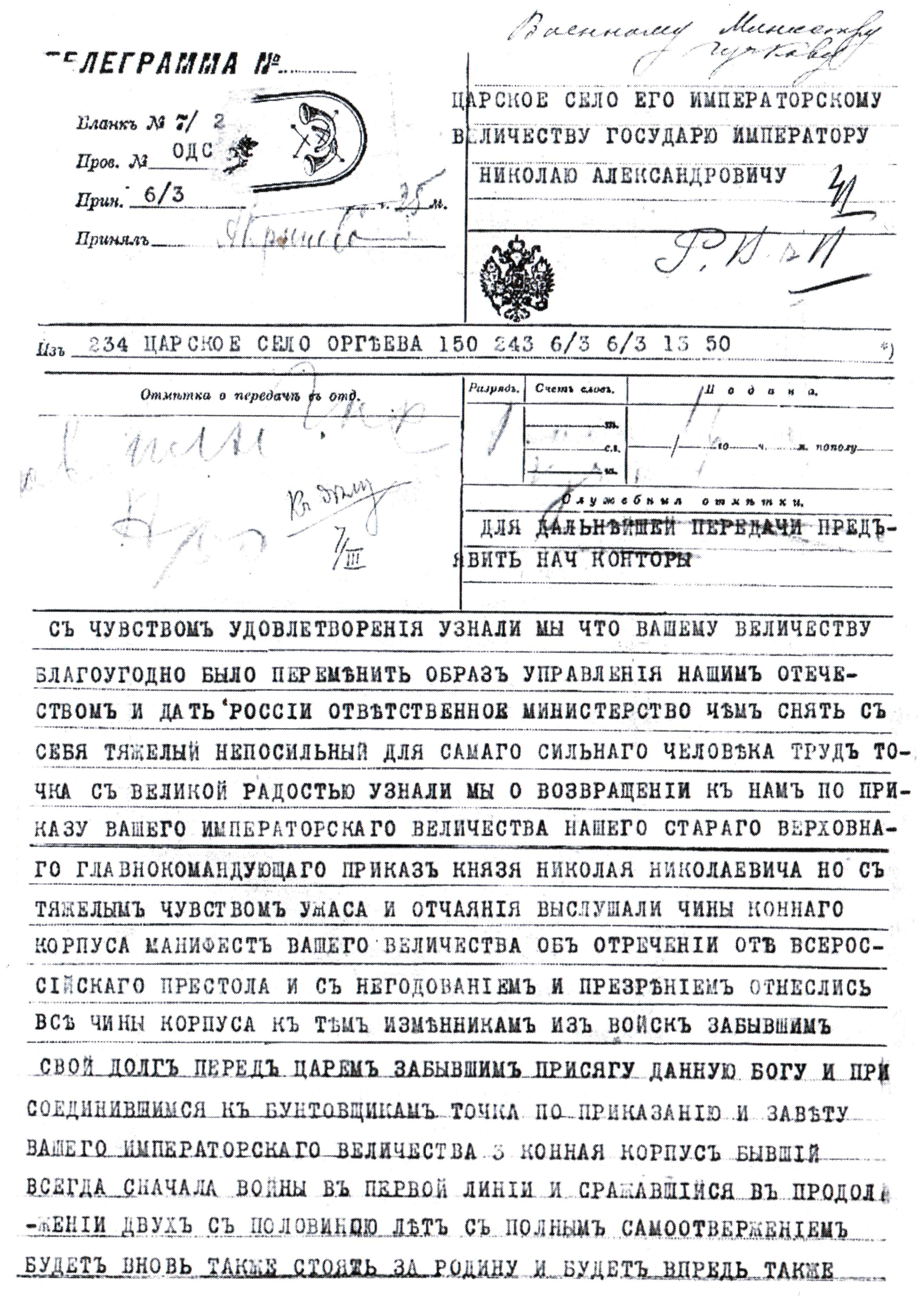

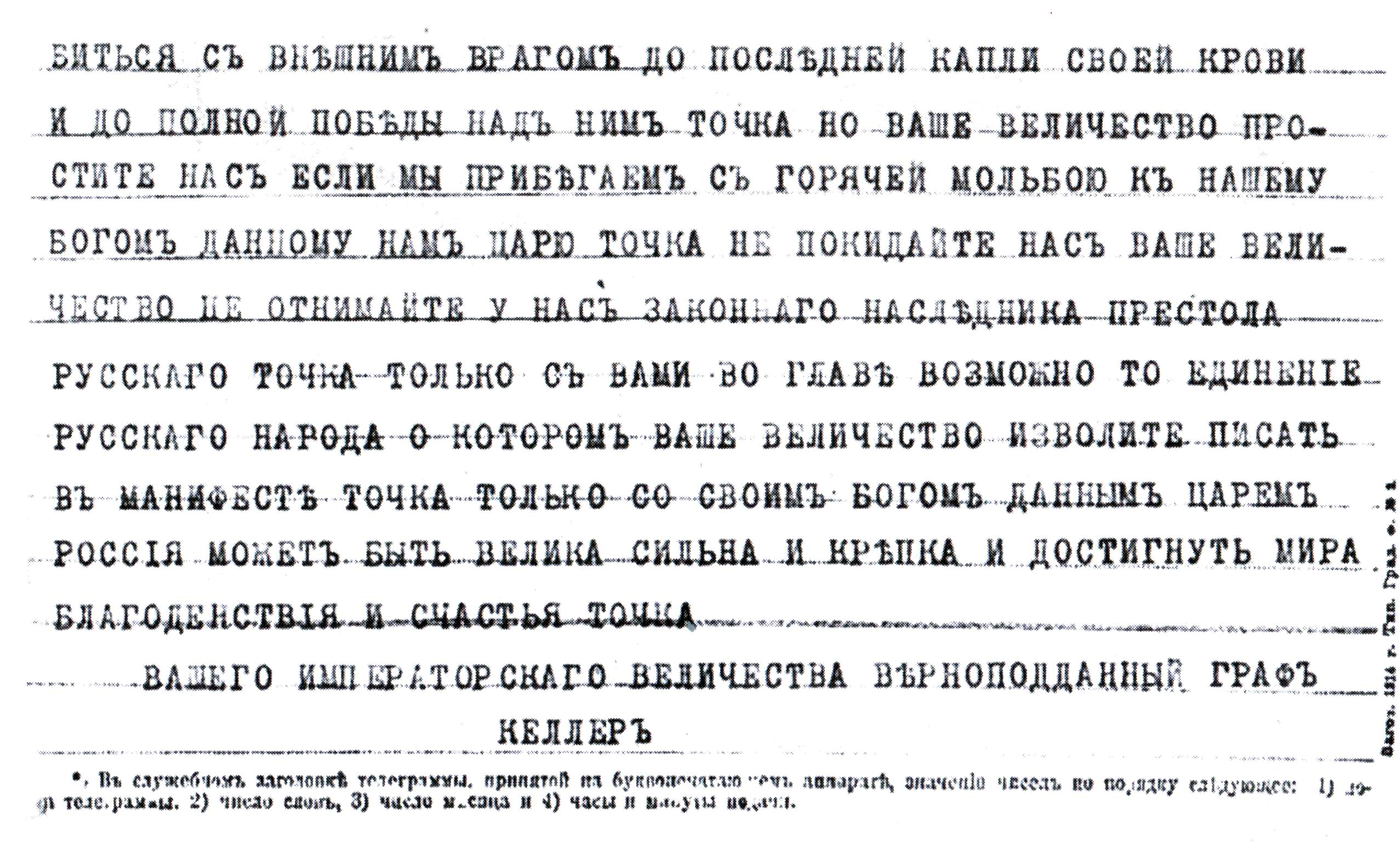
Keller's telegram addressed to the abdicated Nicholas II, March 6, 1917.

After the February Revolution in 1917, Keller was one of the two Russian generals, along with Huseyn Khan Nakhchivanski, who supported the Tsar. Keller sent a telegram to the headquarters of the Supreme Commander-in-Chief to offer Nicholas II the use of his corps for suppression of the revolt, but Nicholas II never received this telegram.

Count Keller refused to take the oath of allegiance to the Russian Provisional Government, and was dismissed from his position. He left for Kharkiv, where his family lived at that time.

Later Keller moved to Kiev, where on 19 November 1918 he was appointed by hetman Pavlo Skoropadskyi the commander-in-chief of all troops on the territory of Ukraine. Skoropadskyi needed the support of Russian monarchists in his struggle against the Ukrainian insurgents, but Keller understood the appointment as the beginning of his own dictatorship. Keller instituted a five-member Council of the State Defense, composed entirely of the monarchist politicians, and stated that he served one Russian state. Skoropadskyi dismissed Keller on 26 November for "overstepping his authorities" and replaced him with general Prince Alexander Dolgorukov.

When Kiev was taken by the troops of the Directorate of Ukraine, Keller was arrested and executed. He was buried in Pokrovskyi Monastery in Kiev. His son, Pavel, served in the Romanian Army during World War II.
