= Russian All National Popular State Movement =

Russian political émigré organization

The Russian All National Popular State Movement (in Russian: Rossiyskoe Obschenatsional'noe Narodno Derzhavnoe Dvizheniye, abbreviated as RONDD, Cyrillic: Российское Общенациональное Народно Державное Движение, abbreviated as РОНДД) was a Russian political émigré organization based primarily in West Germany that sought to unite the participants of the Russian Liberation Army and the anti-communist Russian white émigrés.

RONDD was founded in 1948 by white émigré Evgeny Artsyuk, a veteran of the Russian Liberation Army who often wrote under the pseudonym of Derzhavin (the last name of the Russian poet Gavrila Derzhavin, and originating from the Russian word 'derzhava' meaning 'state'). It numbered several hundred members and published several periodicals, "Derzhavniy Kluch" (The State Key), followed by "Volya Naroda" (The People's Will), and the "Nabat" (The Ringing Bell). One of its best known publications was a book with the illustrations of Constantine Kuznetsov dedicated to the Ice March of the Volunteer army.

The RONDD was considerably more right wing than other liberation movement inspired organizations such as the SBONR (it rejected the Prague Manifesto as being too socialist) but likewise steered clear of a monarchist orientation. It sought to unite conservative German forces in post-war Germany with the Russians, for which purpose it founded a circle known as the New Rossiyan Politics of Germany. It also founded an umbrella organization in 1951 called the Russian National Patriotic Front, aiming to unite several Russian organizations.

RONDD was taken to court over allegations of antisemitism, as its publications occasionally used the term "judeo-communism". RONDD was particularly hostile towards the Russian NTS organization, claiming it was run by the Soviet secret police.

During the times of Nikita Khrushchev's so called "warming period", RONDD's leader Artsyuk legally visited the Soviet Union and exhibited a sense of Soviet patriotism, leading many to believe that he was a Soviet agent whose intent was to divide the Russian émigré community (as Alexander Kazem Bek, founder of the Mladorossi, in the pre-war period). Artsyuk died in Germany having been run over by a truck in 1973.

== See also ==
- White émigré
- Russian Liberation Movement
- Mladorossi
