= Mikhail Meandrov =

Soviet collaborator with Nazi Germany (1894–1946)

- Михаил Меандров
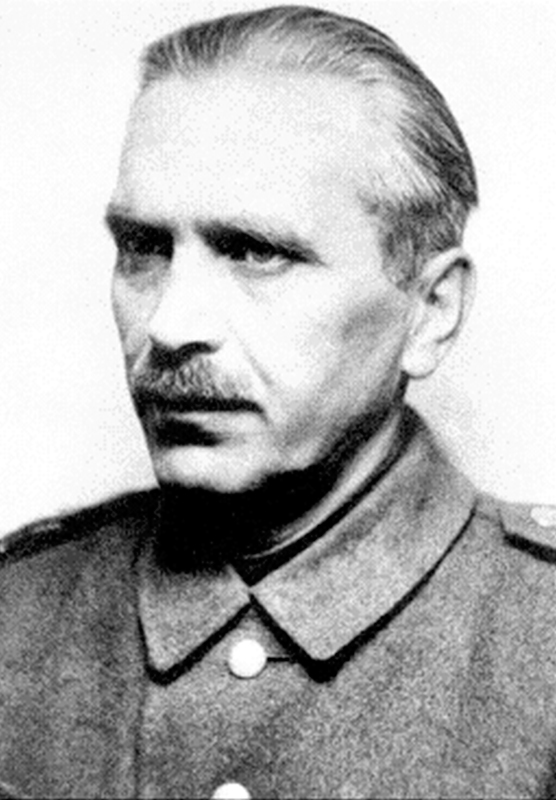
- General Mikhail Alekseyevich Meandrov (Probably mid 1944)

Chairman of the Committee for the Liberation of the Peoples of Russia
- In office May 1945 – February 1946
- Preceded by: Andrey Vlasov
- Succeeded by: Position abolished

Personal details
- Born: 22 October 1894 Moscow, Russian Empire
- Died: 1 August 1946 (aged 51) Moscow, Russian SFSR, Soviet Union
- Cause of death: Execution by hanging
- Party: Russian People's Labour Party (1942–1943); National Alliance of Russian Solidarists (1942–1945)

Military service
- Allegiance: Russian Empire; Soviet Union; Nazi Germany; KONR
- Branch/service: (Russian Empire) Imperial Russian Army; Soviet Army; Russian Liberation Army
- Years of service: 1915—1945
- Rank: (Russian Empire) Staff captain (Soviet Union) Colonel; Major general
- Commands: ROA 2nd Division
- Battles/wars: First World War; Southwestern Front; Second World War; Winter War; Battle of Uman

Mikhail Alekseyevich Meandrov (Russian: Михаи́л Алексе́евич Меа́ндров; 22 October 1894 – 1 August 1946) was an Imperial Russian and later Soviet officer. Taken prisoner by the Germans in World War II near Leningrad in 1941, he later became an important commander (general) in the Russian Liberation Army, a Nazi-sponsored collaborationist formation. Meandrov surrendered to the US forces at the end of the war. Handed over to the Soviet Union, he was convicted of treason and executed in 1946.

== Early career ==
Meandrov graduated from an officer academy at the time of World War I. During that conflict, he fought on the Southwestern Front. He originally commanded the 37th Rifle Corps, before being reassigned to the command staff of the 6th Army in 1941. He fought around Kiev and later was taken prisoner by German Army forces near Uman.

== Defection and death ==
Meandrov joined Lieutenant General Andrey Vlasov, a Red Army defector, in the Russian Liberation Army (Русская освободительная армия, РОА; in Latin "ROA"), and was promoted to the rank of major general. He fought with the ROA until the end of the war, surrendering to the US forces. Handed over to the Soviet Union in 1946, he was found guilty of treason and was executed in Moscow, on 1 August 1946, with eleven other ROA officers, including Vlasov.
