= May Uprising of the Czech people =

May Uprising of Czech people
- Part of World War II
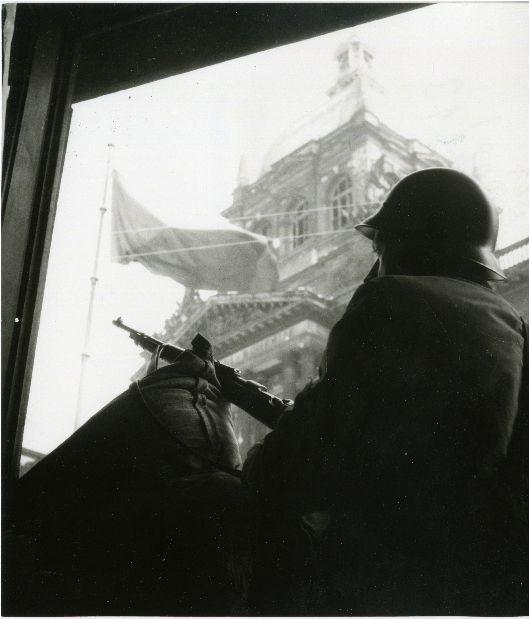
- Prague Uprising, National Museum
Date	1 – 11 May 1945 (1 week and 3 days)
Location	Protectorate of Bohemia and Moravia
Result	Liberation of Czech Lands

Belligerents
(Czechoslovakia) Czech resistance Russian Liberation Army; Soviet Union; United States	Germany

Commanders and leaders
(Czechoslovakia) František Slunečko	(Nazi Germany) Ferdinand Schörner

Strength
130,000 insurgents 14,000 partisans 2,000,000 allied soldiers	1,250,000 men

Casualties and losses
8–10,000 killed	unknown

May Uprising of Czech People was an armed uprising of the Czech people against the German occupiers during World War II in the Czech Republic, which took place in early May 1945. About 130,000 people actively participated in it in the current-day Czech Republic, plus 14,000 partisans (a significant part of whom were of Russian, Ukrainian and Belarusian nationality). Another 100,000 people helped build barricades in Prague.

== Preparations ==
The Czech lands were the longest-occupied territory in Europe. Domestic resistance began to form almost immediately after the invasion, with an early uprising against the occupiers expected, but the rapid advance of German forces after the outbreak of war soon demonstrated how unrealistic were these plans. In the early years of the war, resistance fighters in the Protectorate of Bohemia and Moravia focused primarily on supplying intelligence to British intelligence. The resistance was supported by paratroopers sent to the Protectorate from both the United Kingdom and the Soviet Union. Perhaps the most significant manifestation of the resistance was the assassination of the acting Reich Protector Reinhard Heydrich by Czechoslovak paratroopers sent from Great Britain.

Since 1944, the Czechoslovak government-in-exile in London had been considering preparing an armed uprising in the Protectorate. The paratroopers were to organize an underground army, to which weapons would then be airlifted. Most of the landings that were sent in this way were, however, arrested or failed for other reasons. After the suppression of the Warsaw Uprising, the exiled Ministry of National Defense realized the impossibility of organizing an uprising in this way. In August 1944, an uprising broke out in neighboring Slovakia, but German troops suppressed it within two months.

Nevertheless, there were increasingly significant manifestations of guerrilla warfare on Czech territory and penetrations of partisan groups into the territory of the Protectorate of Bohemia and Moravia. In the second half of 1944, the resistance organization Council of Three played an increasingly important role. Important partisan groups included the Jan Žižka Partisan Brigade, the Jermak, Miroslav Tyrš, Jan Kozina and Mistr Jan Hus partisan units.

From the autumn of 1944, the resistance organization Czech National Council (ČNR) began to form. It began to prepare an armed uprising against the Germans. Independently of them, a group around former officers František Slunečko, Karel Kutlvašr and František Bürger prepared the uprising. The two groups did not know about each other until the outbreak of the uprising. Both groups also lacked soldiers and weapons. The weapons, radios, and other military equipment that the government-in-exile had promised to deliver to the partisans by air were not delivered for a long time. The Soviets also initially refused to supply weapons. It was not until mid-March that the British began to supply the rebels with weapons, but the deliveries were hampered by many problems. By 5 May 1945, only about 1,600 men had been armed with them, which was insufficient for the uprising. The Soviet Union also supplied weapons on 27 April, and another shipment was sent during the uprising.

Other partisan groups began to emerge mainly in March and April 1945, when the partisan struggle against the German occupiers reached its peak, with open partisan warfare taking place, especially in the territories of eastern and western Moravia (Wallachia and Vysočina).German columns were increasingly attacked, fuel was released from tankers, trains were derailed and bridges were destroyed by explosions. For example, on April 10, 1945, the important Brno–Jihlava railway line was severely damaged, which was not repaired until the end of the war. During this action, a German military transport was blown up, killing or injuring almost 200 military and other people. [source?] In addition to diversionary actions on the railways, Nazi garrisons, ammunition depots, military facilities were attacked, and electrical, telephone and telegraph lines were interrupted.

== The outbreak of the uprising ==
By the end of April 1945, Soviet troops had liberated part of Moravia in two operations – the Ostrava and Bratislava-Brno operations – which, together with the later news of Hitler’s death, provided grounds for open resistance. The uprising began on May 1 in Přerov, when a false report about Germany’s capitulation spread. The German and Hungarian troops were disarmed, and the National Committee took power. The uprising spread to Olomouc and surrounding villages on the same day, but SS units intervened there. However, the insurgents managed to stop the transport or liquidation of industrial equipment and supplies that the Germans wanted to take from the Ostrava, Vsetín and Zlín regions. On May 2, Nymburk, Poděbrady, Chlumec nad Cidlinou and Úpice rose up, the next day Semily, Železný Brod, Turnov, Jilemnice, Stará and Nová Paka, Příbram, Beroun, Vizovice, on May 4 Vsetín and Kladno, on May 5 Louny, Jindřichův Hradec, Rokycany, Klatovy, Domažlice and others. Anti-occupation demonstrations were recorded in approximately a thousand places, which consisted of the hoisting of Czechoslovak flags, the removal of German signs, the destruction of orientation signs, demonstrations to celebrate liberation, protest actions against the occupation authorities, etc. There were also strikes in factories and the confiscation of weapons from arms factories in favor of the insurgents. Negotiations on the takeover of power took place in more than 120 places in the Protectorate. In some areas, the uprising flared up thanks to the activities of partisan groups, which increasingly entered into open combat. For example, in Vsetín on May 4, the Jan Žižka partisan brigade attacked the Germans, who had begun to carry out destructive work in the city, which had to be stopped. The city was liberated after 4 p.m. by units of the 1st Czechoslovak Army Corps. Partisan groups also played a major role in the Giant Mountains and other places.

== Uprising ==
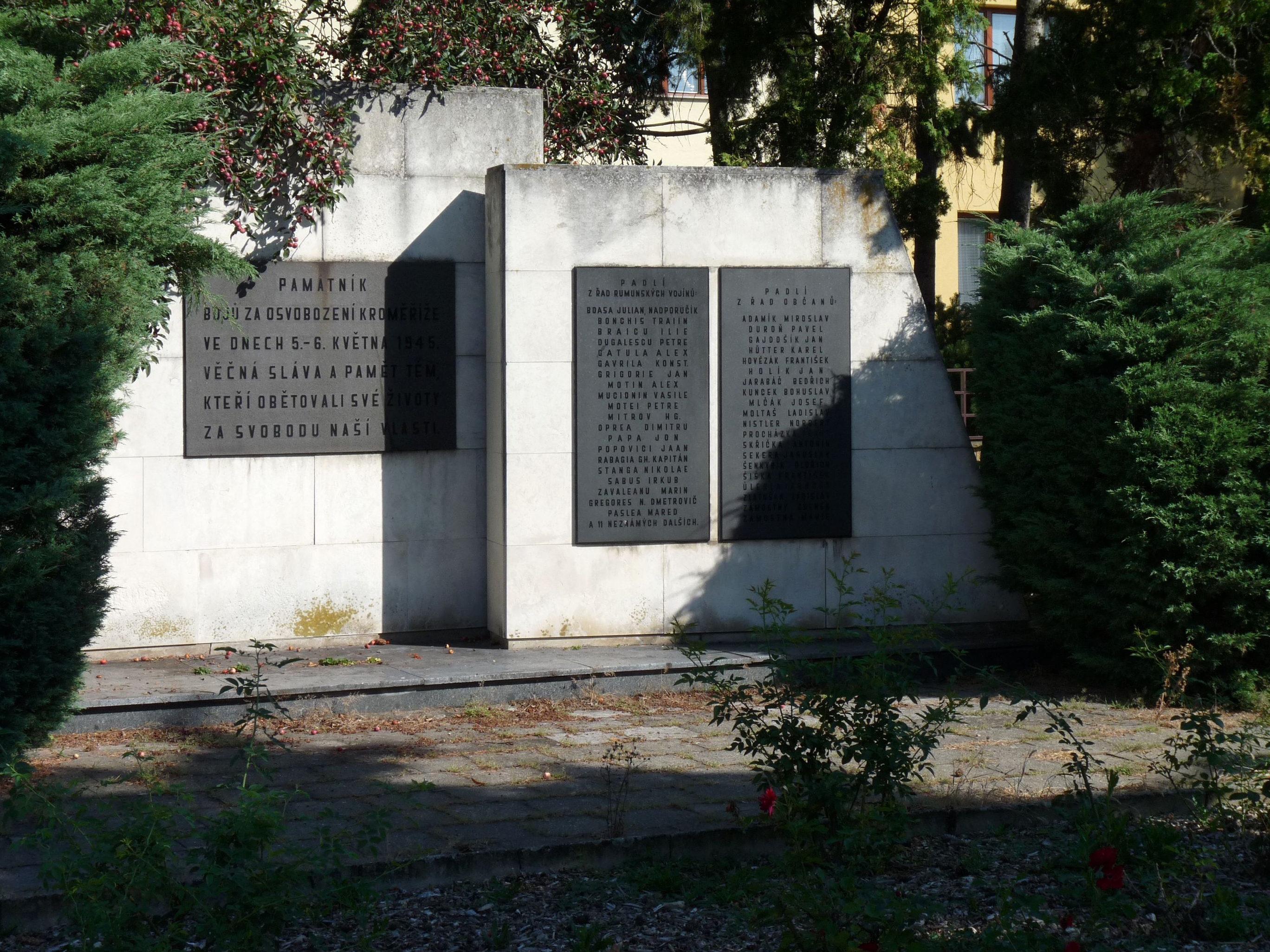
Romanian soldiers and Czechs who died on May 5-6 in Kroměříž fighting against the Germans

On May 5, an uprising broke out in the capital, Prague. The Czech National Council issued a declaration on the end of the Protectorate and the takeover of government and executive power. Demonstrations were also held here at first, but they soon turned into open resistance. Insurgents in Prague and throughout Bohemia and Moravia seized weapons, occupied post offices, railways and important road junctions. Thousands of insurgents from among the Czech population joined the resistance and partisan groups; former soldiers, gendarmerie, and liberated Soviet prisoners of war working as slave laborers in the Protectorate. The occupiers were prevented from transporting machinery, equipment and means of transport to Germany, so as to prevent the destruction of factories, etc. (ARLZ plan - scorched earth tactics). The insurgents prevented the smooth supply of the front and the organized retreat of the Wehrmacht.

The uprising, which broke out in 37 cities and 240 villages, and involved 130,000 people plus 14,000 partisans, received a severe counterattack in some places – German troops began to occupy important roads, streets, crossroads, railway stations and post offices, a state of emergency was declared, the occupiers took and murdered hostages in order to intimidate the Czech population. Their goal was to prevent the creation of a continuous insurgent territory. Nevertheless, the insurgents managed to tie down a significant force of German troops, which could not be used to suppress the uprising in Prague. The countryside supplied Prague not only with food, but also with medical supplies and light weapons; roadblocks were built and bridges were blown up to make transport as difficult as possible for the Wehrmacht and Waffen SS units. The resistance of the population continued in the countryside, where it was constantly expanding. In many places there was open fighting, in others only sabotage. The Germans increasingly resorted to murder and massacre of Czech residents, who were taken hostage or executed as a warning, not only in Prague, but in practically the entire occupied territory of Bohemia and Moravia.

Meanwhile, the American 3rd Army under General George S. Patton was advancing into Czechoslovakia from the west. By the end of April, Patton had already received orders to secure the Czechoslovak border all the way to Austria. On the evening of May 4, the Supreme Allied Commander, General Dwight D. Eisenhower, telephoned Patton and gave him permission to continue advancing into the interior of Czechoslovakia. Patton's army, which numbered about 540,000 soldiers, set out the next morning. In places it encountered stiff resistance, in others the Germans quickly surrendered, fearing Soviet capture. The Soviets did not agree with the American advance, but they themselves continued to Prague and fought fierce battles with the Germans. When Patton learned of the fighting in Prague on May 5, that evening and informed his superior, General Bradley, that he would capture Prague with his troops by the next day. Bradley disagreed, wanting General Eisenhower to decide on this action. Bradley ultimately forbade Patton from advancing further, and Eisenhower reassured General Antonov that he had ordered his troops not to advance beyond the Karlovy Vary–Plzeň–České Budějovice line. At 2 p.m. on May 6, Soviet forces from Dresden, Brno, and Krnov set out for Prague. However, the insurgents were not informed of this advance. After much hesitation, units of the Russian Liberation Army, the so-called Vlasovites, also joined the fighting against the Germans in Prague. They captured several Prague districts, including the Ruzyně Airport, but after a rift with the communist members of the Czech National Council (for example, Josef Smrkovský called the Vlasovites traitors and enemies), they withdrew from Prague. The Western Allies did not provide Prague with any assistance – the Soviets banned the promised air deliveries of weapons and ammunition, as they did not want any foreign aircraft in their territory, and when a delegation of the American army arrived in Prague on the evening of 7 May, they only informed the rebels that Germany had signed the surrender and that the Americans would not come to Prague. The Soviets also banned the involvement of Czechoslovak airmen.

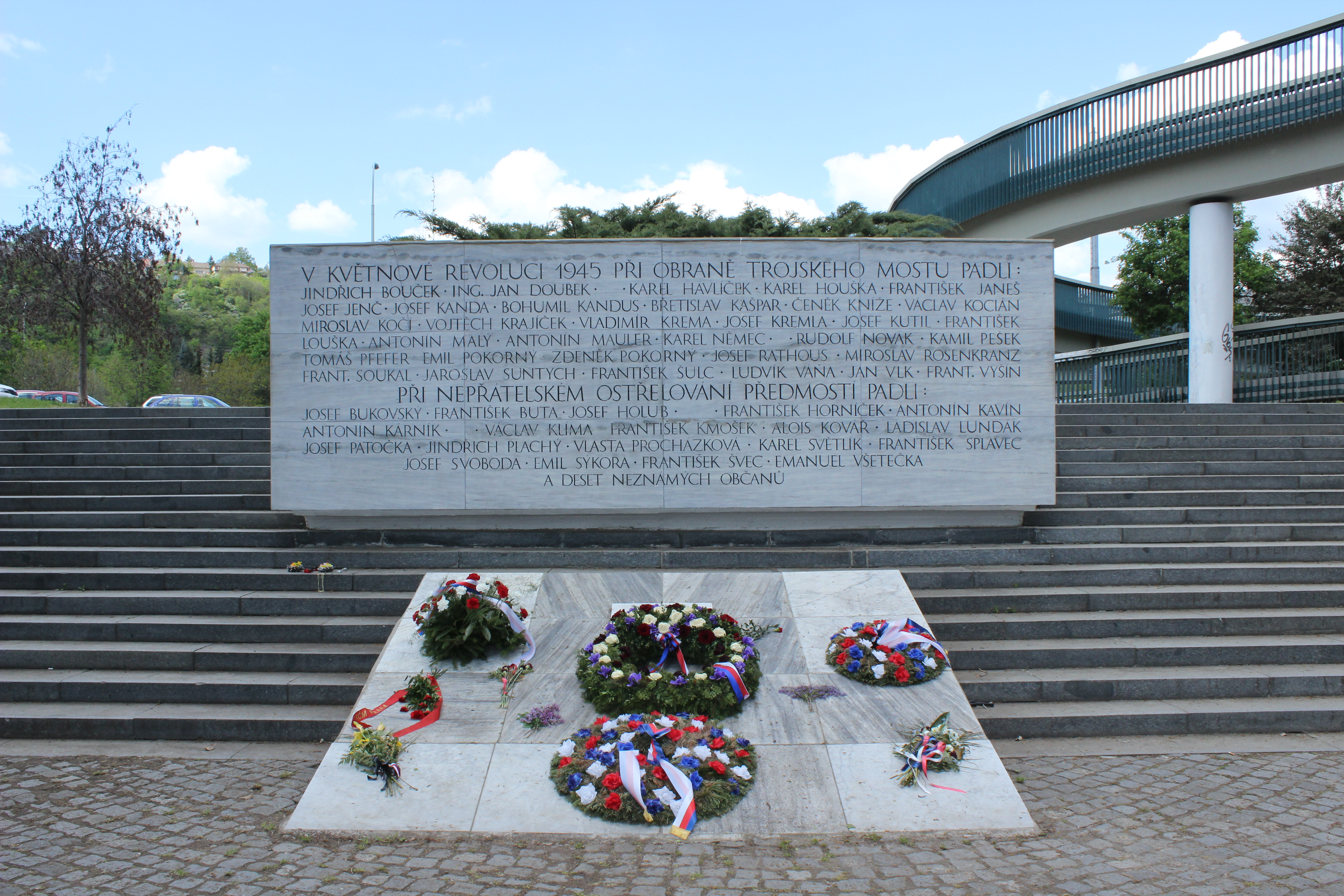
List of fallen defenders of the Troja Bridge (on whose site the Barikádník Bridge now stands) in Prague

The fighting continued even after Germany signed the unconditional surrender on 7 May 1945 (it was to take effect at midnight on 8 May), when German troops tried to surrender to the American army, as there were considerable fears of Soviet capture. These battles were led mainly by Waffen SS units, but it was not uncommon for Wehrmacht units to also participate. On the morning of 7 May, Hitler's successor Karl Dönitz ordered Marshal Ferdinand Schörner to retreat to the west with his army group. The main effort of Schörner's forces was to reach American captivity. However, the retreat was slowed down by the need to bypass the fighting Prague, the troops had to use side roads, and there were traffic jams.

On the evening of 7 May, an American military delegation arrived in Prague and met with representatives of the Bartoš command. However, it only brought news of the German surrender and the message that the Americans could not come to Prague's aid. Another American delegation arrived in Prague on the night of May 8. Its destination was the Velichovky spa, where Marshal Schörner's staff was located. In Prague, the members of the delegation negotiated with both Bartoš's headquarters and General Toussaint, the commander of the German forces in Prague. They asked him to stop the fighting in Prague and help convince Schörner to give the order to abandon resistance, since the Third Reich had already surrendered. It is unclear whether the delegation in Velichovky actually met Schörner - according to some sources, yes, but according to others, Schörner had already fled. However, the German generals refused to stop the fighting, citing the loss of communication with subordinate units and were determined to force their way into American captivity by force of arms. On the return trip, the American military mission avoided Prague. In Kralupy and Český Brod, she prevented the Germans from murdering Czech hostages.

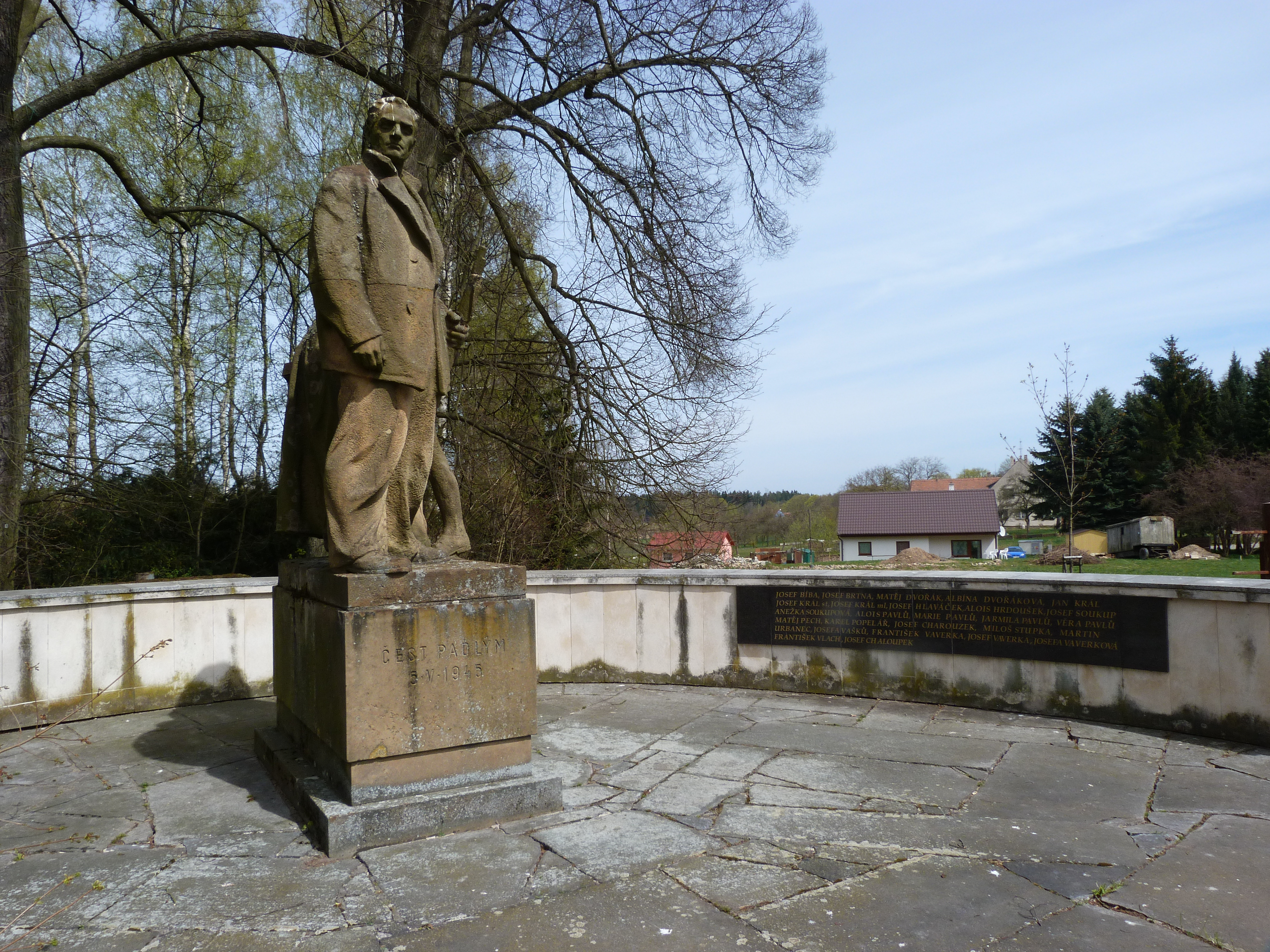
Memorial to the village of Leskovice, which was massacred by SS members under the command of Walter Hauck in May 1945

On the morning of May 8, Moscow radio announced that the Red Army had broken through the German lines near Dresden and was advancing into Bohemia. However, it was not clear when it would be able to reach Prague. The Soviets did not provide air support to the insurgents, and they also prevented the Americans from doing so. The Czech insurgents were running out of strength, weapons, and ammunition. The German command was well aware of this situation. In the early hours of May 8, the most powerful German attack on Prague to date began, using tanks, artillery, and aircraft. The SS were the most active, while some Wehrmacht soldiers were already refusing to fight.

Schörner ordered Toussaint to destroy Prague and massacre its inhabitants, but Toussaint refused and instead went to the headquarters of the Czech National Council in the morning to negotiate a cessation of hostilities. On May 8 at 4 p.m., a surrender protocol was drawn up between Touissant, the Czech National Council, and the Bartoš headquarters, allowing the Germans to pass through Prague, with the understanding that the fighting would cease. It was to come into effect at 6 p.m. the same day. According to the agreement, the Germans were to cease fighting and release all prisoners and internees. In return, they were to be allowed to leave Prague freely towards the Americans. They were to leave their aircraft and heavy military equipment behind. Isolated groups of Nazi fanatics did not respect the signed surrender and continued to fight.

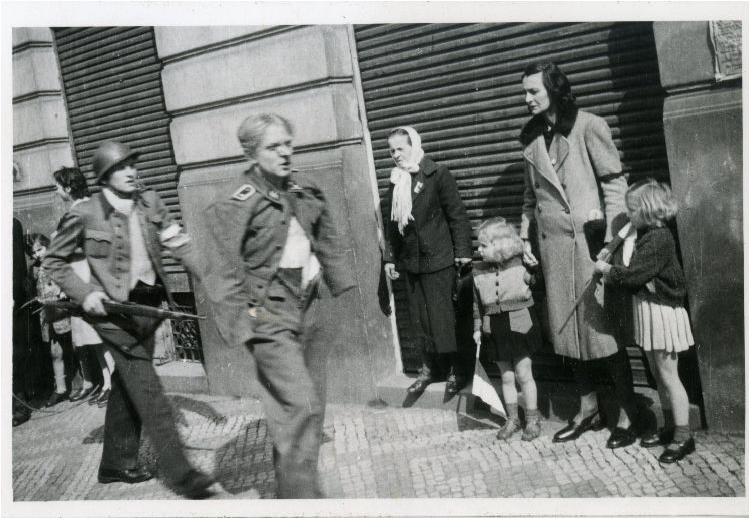
Captured German soldier on May 5, 1945

The insurgents in Prague still had no information about how far away the Soviet troops were from Prague and when they might arrive in Prague. The Czechoslovak National Council and the Bartoš headquarters sent representatives to the Americans to discuss the possibility of liberating Prague. American commanders considered this option, but Soviet approval was lacking. The British headquarters eventually informed Czech officials that the Allies would intervene if the Germans committed atrocities against the inhabitants of Prague after midnight on 9 May. The American army never received the order to liberate Prague. On the morning of 9 May, the Red Army occupied Prague.

On 8 May and then 9 May, after the armistice, Soviet aircraft bombed Czechoslovak territory in an attempt to prevent the German army from retreating into the American zone. During the two days, a total of 66 air raids were carried out, including those on the following towns and cities: Hrotovice, Krucemburk, Ždírec nad Doubravou, Mělník, Roudnice nad Labem, Byšice, Mladá Boleslav. The attacks were always carried out by Pe-2 aircraft in groups of five to nine. About 1,300 people died in these attacks.

The retreating Germans continued to try to be captured by the Americans. However, on May 9 at 7:00 PM, the Americans closed their demarcation line and did not accept any more prisoners. Some German soldiers preferred to fight until the last moment rather than be captured by the Soviets. Therefore, fighting on Czech territory continued until May 12. For example, in the village of Lejčkov in the Tábor region, on May 9, German troops shot at people who had come to the road to observe the retreat of the German army; Shootings of unarmed civilians also occurred in other places. The last shots were fired on May 11, 1945, near Milín near Příbram, where SS units lured out partisan parliamentarians with a white flag and shot them.

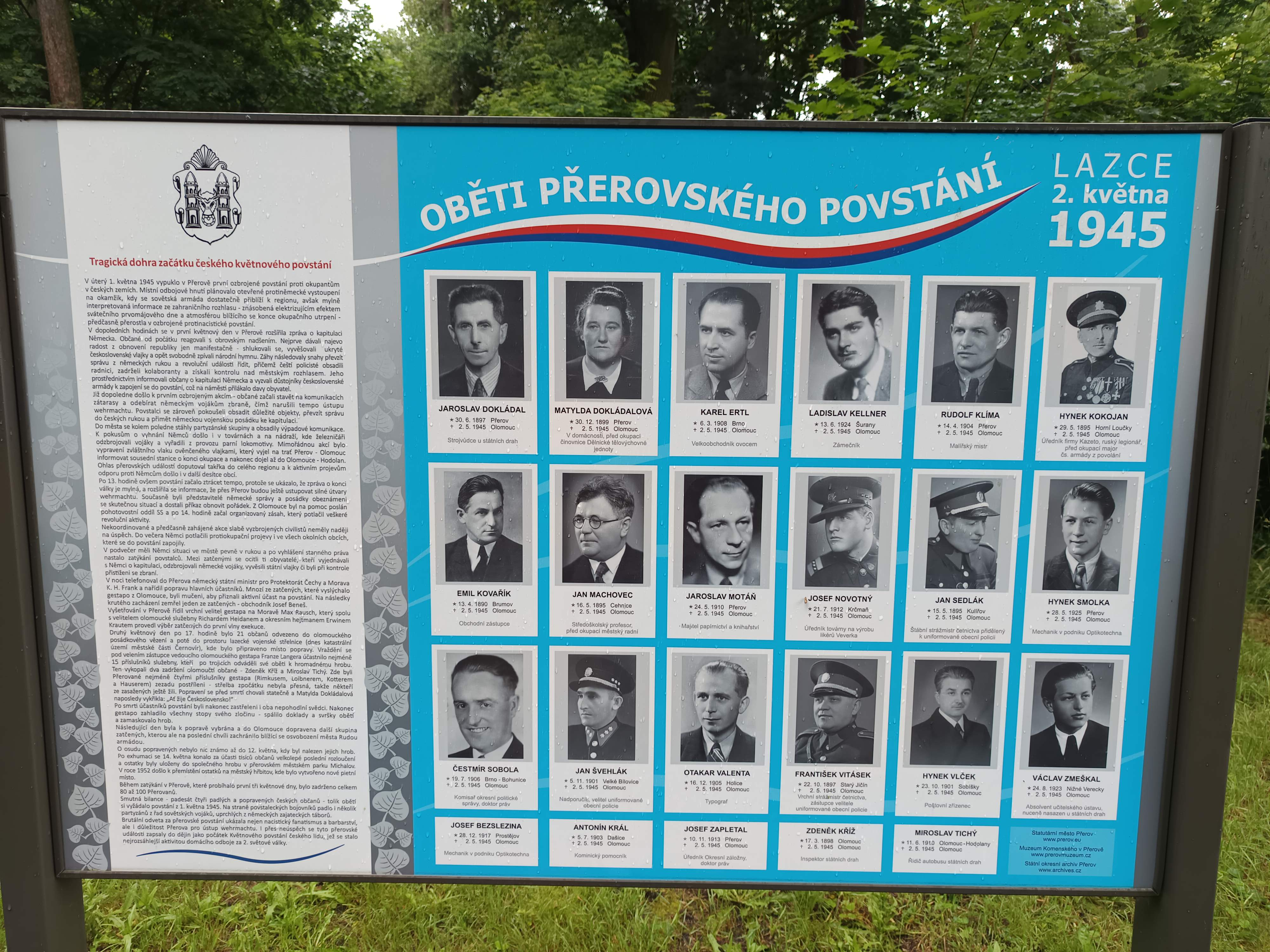
Information panel in Olomouc at the monument to the executed participants in the Přerov Uprising

Estimates of the number of victims of the uprising vary. According to one source, the uprising claimed 1,694 Czech lives in Prague, and approximately 8,000 more citizens died in the Czech and Moravian countryside, including both people who fought against the occupiers and civilians killed by the Nazis. Publicist Karel Pacner estimates that 11,700 people were killed including 3,700 in Prague. According to him, the balance of losses could have been significantly lower if the Czech National Council had asked for help from the Americans or if it had not resisted the help of the Vlasovites.

== Aftermath ==
The liberation of Prague began the period of the so-called Third Czechoslovak Republic, which lasted until 1948, when Czechoslovakia was taken over by the Communists. On 10 May 1945, the government of Zdeněk Fierlinger arrived in Prague and, after a ceremonial welcome, held its first session together with the Czech National Council. On 16 May, Edvard Beneš returned to Prague, was celebrated as a liberator and took up the office of president again. However, the Communists did not like this, they would rather see Zdeněk Nejedlý as the President.

Sporadic fighting continued outside Prague until 20 May.
