= Committee for the Liberation of the Peoples of Russia =

Nazi-backed anti-Soviet political organization

Committee for the Liberation of the Peoples of Russia Комитет освобождения народов России
- Governing body: Presidium of the KONR
- Chairman: Andrey Vlasov (1st); Mikhail Meandrov (2nd)
- Founded: 14 November 1944
- Dissolved: February 1946 (de facto)
- Succeeded by: RONDD, SBONR
- Armed wing: Russian Liberation Army
- Ideology: Anti-Sovietism; Anti-capitalism; Populism; Factions: Russian nationalism; Corporate solidarism; Anti-Stalinist Left (Social democracy, Marxism, Bukharinism); Nationalist separatism
- Colours: White Blue Red
- Part of: Vlasov Movement
- Allies: Russian Solidarists
- Opponents: Soviet Union

Committee flag
- Politics of Russia; Political parties; Elections; a: While the Russian leaders of the KONR adhered to Russian national populism, the KONR presented itself as a multi-national organization cooperating with representatives of non-Russian nations of the Soviet Union on the grounds of the right to self-determination of peoples of Russia and the Soviet Union. b: Represented by the members of the NTS and its sympathizers. The NTS had a considerable influence prior to the formation of the KONR,; some of its leaders like Fyodor Truhin were members of the NTS. c: While Vlasov's main ideologue Milety Zykov, characterized as a follower of Bukharin, was killed before the formation of the KONR, his ideological "line" was continued by such people as N. Kovalchuk, one of the editors of the Manifesto. Zykov himself used the labels "Marxist" and "Social Democrat". A social democratic perspective of Russia was prominent among the Soviet POWs who hoped to "mold" the project influenced by the NTS. Generally the historian Martynov characterizes the Manifesto as "social democratic" "with elements of totalitarian thinking."

The Committee for the Liberation of the Peoples of Russia (Russian: Комитет освобождения народов России, Komitet osvobozhdeniya narodov Rossii, abbreviated as Russian: КОНР, KONR) was composed of military and civilian collaborators with Nazi Germany from territories of the Soviet Union, most of them being ethnic Russians, and was the political authority of the Vlasov movement aligned with the Axis powers. It was founded by General Andrey Vlasov on 14 November 1944, in Prague, occupied Czechoslovakia, which was purposely chosen because it was a Slavic city that was still under Axis control. (Note: Warsaw was also under German occupation but it had been largely destroyed during the Warsaw Uprising.) Vlasov had received the permission to establish the committee from Reichsführer-SS Heinrich Himmler.

The goals of the committee were embodied in a document known as the Prague Manifesto. The manifesto's fourteen points guaranteed the freedom of speech, press, religion, and assembly, as well as a right to self-determination of any ethnic group living in territories belonging to Russia up to creating nation-states. Ideologically, the Vlasov movement was between the Russian nationalism of the National Alliance of Russian Solidarists (NTS), an organisation of far-right origins, as its ideologues surrounded Vlasov with the support of the Nazis, and the Soviet POWs which held to more social democratic views; some of Vlasov's prominent collaborators like Milety Zykov, the main ideologue of his movement and the Russian Liberation Army, described themselves as Marxists; the movement tended to oppose both the USSR and capitalism. The Prague Manifesto did not contain any explicit antisemitic or other racialist rhetoric. However, criticism aimed at the Western Allies (specifically US and UK) was included in the manifesto's preamble. In general, the Nazis described the positions of the KONR as an "infusion of liberal and Bolshevik ideologies".

In January 1945 Vlasov's Russian Liberation Army was organized into several divisions, though not all of them finished forming due to the collapse of the German war effort, and other Russian volunteer units serving in the Wehrmacht and Waffen-SS were nominally transferred to its command in April 1945 as the "Armed Forces of the Committee for the Liberation of the Peoples of Russia." The latter included the Kazachi Stan militia forces under Ataman Timofey Domanov, which had gathered in northern Italy by May 1945, as well as the XV SS Cossack Cavalry Corps under the nominal command of Ivan Kononov in Yugoslavia. In the chaotic final months of the Third Reich, the divisions under Vlasov's direct command tried to move to western Czechoslovakia and Austria after briefly engaging the Red Army in Operation April Storm during its advance on Berlin. The Russian troops sided against the Germans during the Prague Uprising, before leaving the city due to the Red Army approaching Prague. After attempting to surrender to the United States Army, many of its members either surrendered to the Red Army or were later repatriated to the Soviet Union by the Western Allies, with the last stage of the repatriation program being Operation Keelhaul.

After the surrender of Germany to the Allies, the committee ceased to operate. During the immediate post-war period, several new organisations sprang up that intended to continue the committee's goal of fighting communism (i.e., the Union of the St. Andrew Flag; the Committee of United Vlasovites; the Union of Battle for the Liberation of the Peoples of Russia), started by veterans of the committee and the Russian Liberation Army who managed to avoid forced repatriation to the Soviet Union. Two latter organisations participated in US-led efforts to form a united anti-Soviet platform of Soviet emigres.

In the United States, a CIA-led organisation with a similar name, the American Committee for the Liberation of the Peoples of Russia, was founded in the late 1940s, and became known for their propaganda broadcaster Radio Liberty, which was run by the Central Intelligence Agency and later funded by the United States Congress. It operated from Munich, in West Germany. Members of the Vlasovite organisations established after the war contributed to the American Committee.

== Formation ==
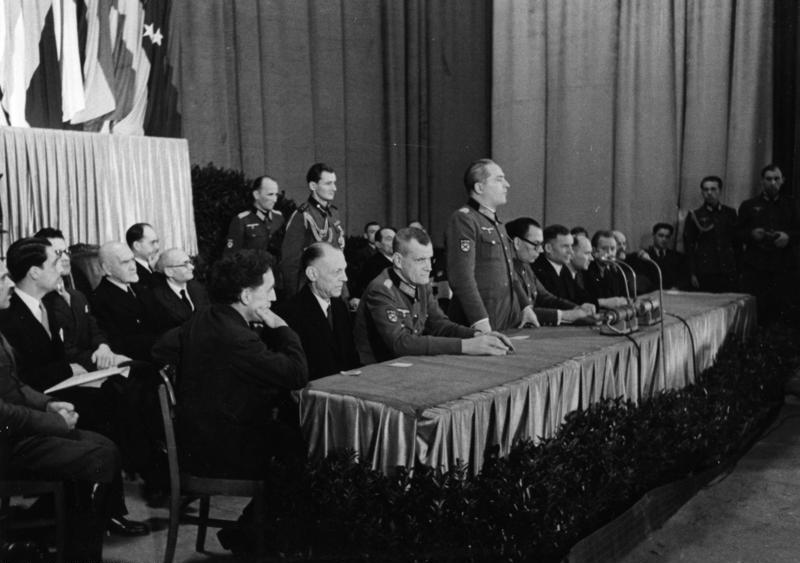
Manifestation of the Committee in a palace in Prague

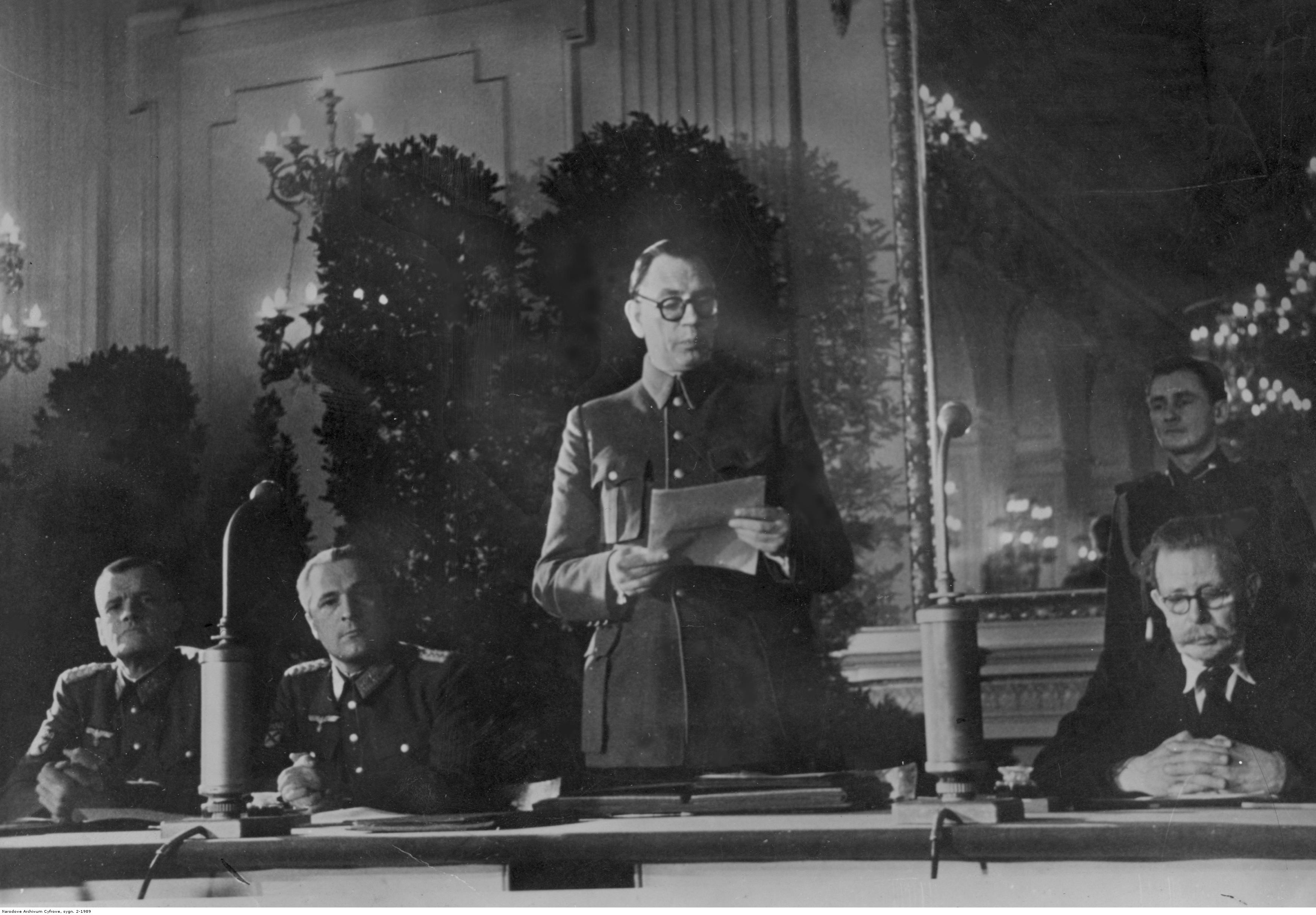
Vlasov speaking at the founding

Andrey Vlasov, a Red Army general who had been captured in 1942 and defected to the Germans, had no success in getting support for a Russian national army from the senior German leadership until the summer of 1944, when the head of the SS, Heinrich Himmler, took interest in his cause. He had a six-hour meeting with Himmler on 16 September 1944, getting his approval to form an army, and it began to be assembled on 28 January 1945. The Prague Manifesto, stating the ideology of the Committee for the Liberation for the Peoples of Russia, was announced on 14 November 1944 in Prague. The meeting was not attended by Himmler, but the German government representatives at the Prague conference were Werner Lorenz from the German Foreign Ministry and Wilhelm Frick, the governor of Bohemia and Moravia. A total of 37 people signed the Prague Manifesto, including Red Army defectors, Soviet professors, White émigrés, and ordinary civilians. Vlasov became the chairman of the KONR and the commander-in-chief of the Armed Forces (VS KONR).

Additional meetings of the committee, which eventually expanded to 102 members, took place in Berlin on 18 November and 17 December 1944, and in Prague on 27 February 1945. After the meeting in Prague only the Presidium of the KONR was convened.

== Armed Forces ==
Under the command of the Armed Forces of the Committee for the Liberation of the Peoples of Russia (abbreviated VS KONR) were the following:

- 1st Division of the Russian Liberation Army, commanded by Sergei Bunyachenko
- 2nd Division of the Russian Liberation Army, commanded by Grigory Zverev
- 3rd Division of the Russian Liberation Army, commanded by Mikhail Shapovalov
- Air force of the KONR, commanded by Viktor Maltsev
- Russian Corps in Yugoslavia, commanded by Boris Shteifon
- XV Cossack Cavalry Corps, commanded by Ivan Kononov
- Separate Cossack Corps, commanded by Timofei Domanov (based on Kazachi Stan militia)
- 1st combined officer school of the Russian Liberation Army, commanded by Mikhail Meandrov
- Various other independent units

== Ideology and organization ==
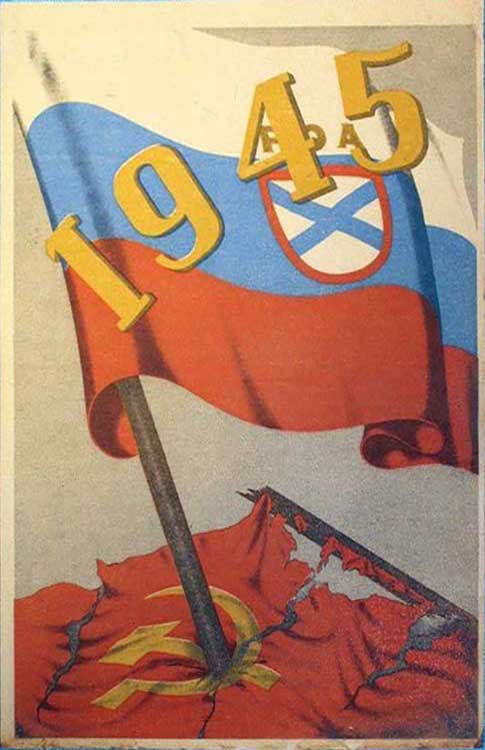
KONR New Year's greetings in 1945

The Prague Manifesto laid out Andrey Vlasov's political and economic program for Russia in the event of the defeat of the Soviet Union. The manifesto claimed that World War II was a conflict being fought by the "imperialist powers" of Britain and the United States, and the "internationalist" powers led by Joseph Stalin, against "freedom-loving nations," and made no reference to Nazi Germany. It said that the Russian Revolution in 1917 was legitimate, but its progress was criminally usurped from the Russian people by the "Bolsheviks"; the revolution, however, was not divided into the February Revolution and the October Revolution, and the figure of Vladimir Lenin was not criticized in the documents of the KONR nor did it have any assessment, first of all, because the leadership of the KONR avoided splitting the movement on such questions as the attitude towards the October Revolution and Leninism and wanted to maintain the alliance between various opinions, and secondly, because the leaders of the KONR were products of the Soviet society, and they agreed with many aspects of the Soviet system. The Prague Manifesto supported a social system based on private agriculture and disbandment of the collective farms; some of the members advocated for keeping the industry nationalized, seeing it as a middle ground between the Western capitalism and the Soviet economy. A prominent collaborator of the movement, Milety Zykov, described as the main ideologue of the Vlasovites, held views that could be called "Marxist" or supportive of Nikolai Bukharin and the Right opposition to Stalin. Zykov, a man of Jewish origins, disappeared, presumably killed by the Nazis, before the establishment of the KONR; however, his line was continued by N. Kovalchuk, one of the authors of the Prague manifesto.

The manifesto set out its goals as the restoration of freedom of speech, religion, assembly, and of the press, the defense of private property, and the abolition of forced labor. Furthermore, it called for the creation of a Russian Liberation Army to overthrow the "tyranny created by Stalin" and sought an "honorable peace" with Germany. There also was an undated memorandum, possibly a draft of a formal agreement, in which the KONR gave up Crimea to Germany and also promised autonomy to the Cossacks and to other groups within Russia.

The Nazis were suspicious of Vlasov, his organisation and his ideological position, and the Gestapo warned about the possibility of the Vlasovites betraying the Reich. The suspicions and criticism of the Vlasovites from the Reich officials was summarised in a document by the Ministry of Propaganda official Eberhard Taubert who described his concerns about the movement being "not National Socialist": "It is significant that it does not fight Jewry, that the Jewish Question is not recognized as such at all"; instead it presented "a watered-down infusion of liberal and Bolshevik ideologies", and Taubert described the concern with "strong Anglophile sympathies" and it "toying with the idea of a possible change of course" while not "feel[ing] bound to Germany".

The committee was organized into a Central Administration, Military Section, Civilian Department, Propaganda Section, Security Section, Financial Department, Foreign Department, Central Cossack Office, Cultural Department, Academic Committee, and Red Cross. Some of these departments were not fully formed before the end of the war. The financial department succeeded in obtaining a loan from the German government on 18 January 1945.

== Gallery ==
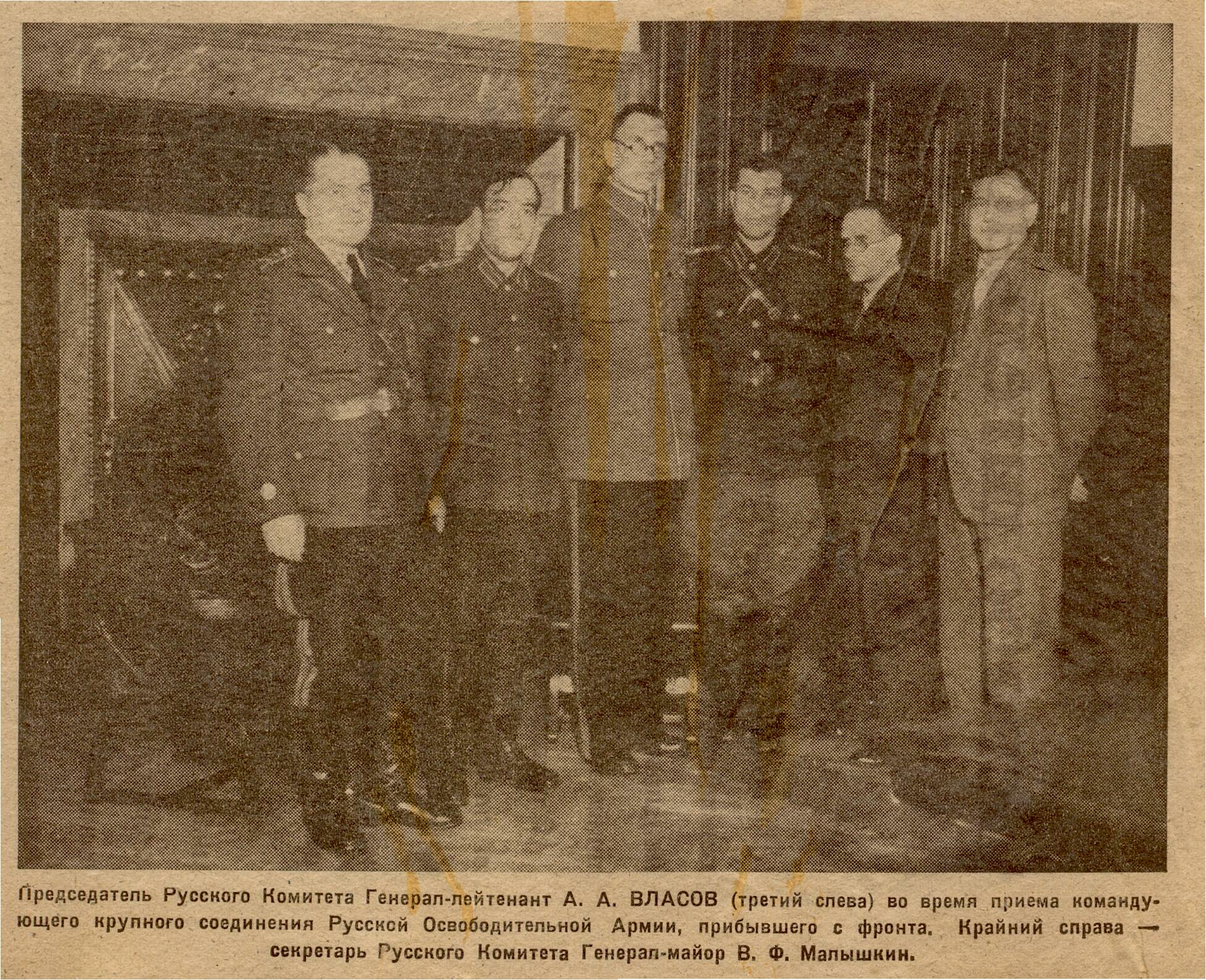
Leaflet of the Russian Liberation Army leaders in 1942

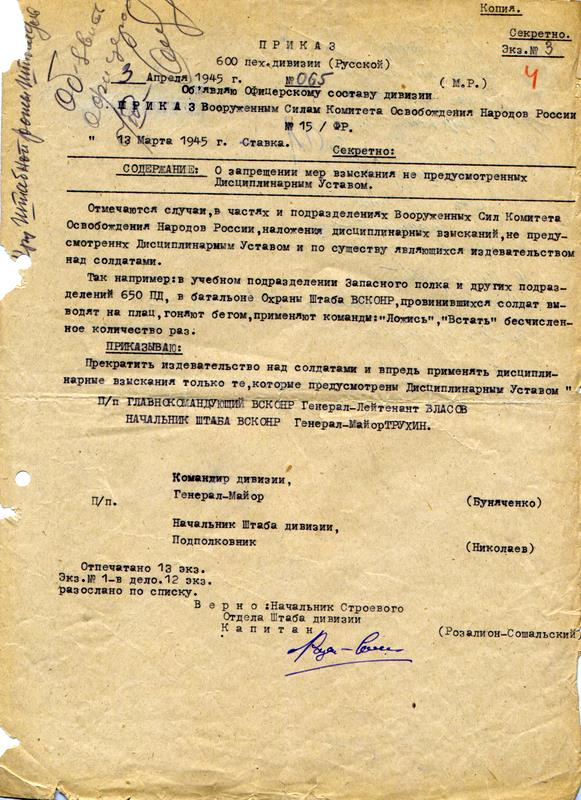
General Vlasov's order to prevent Dedovshchina in all forces related to KONR

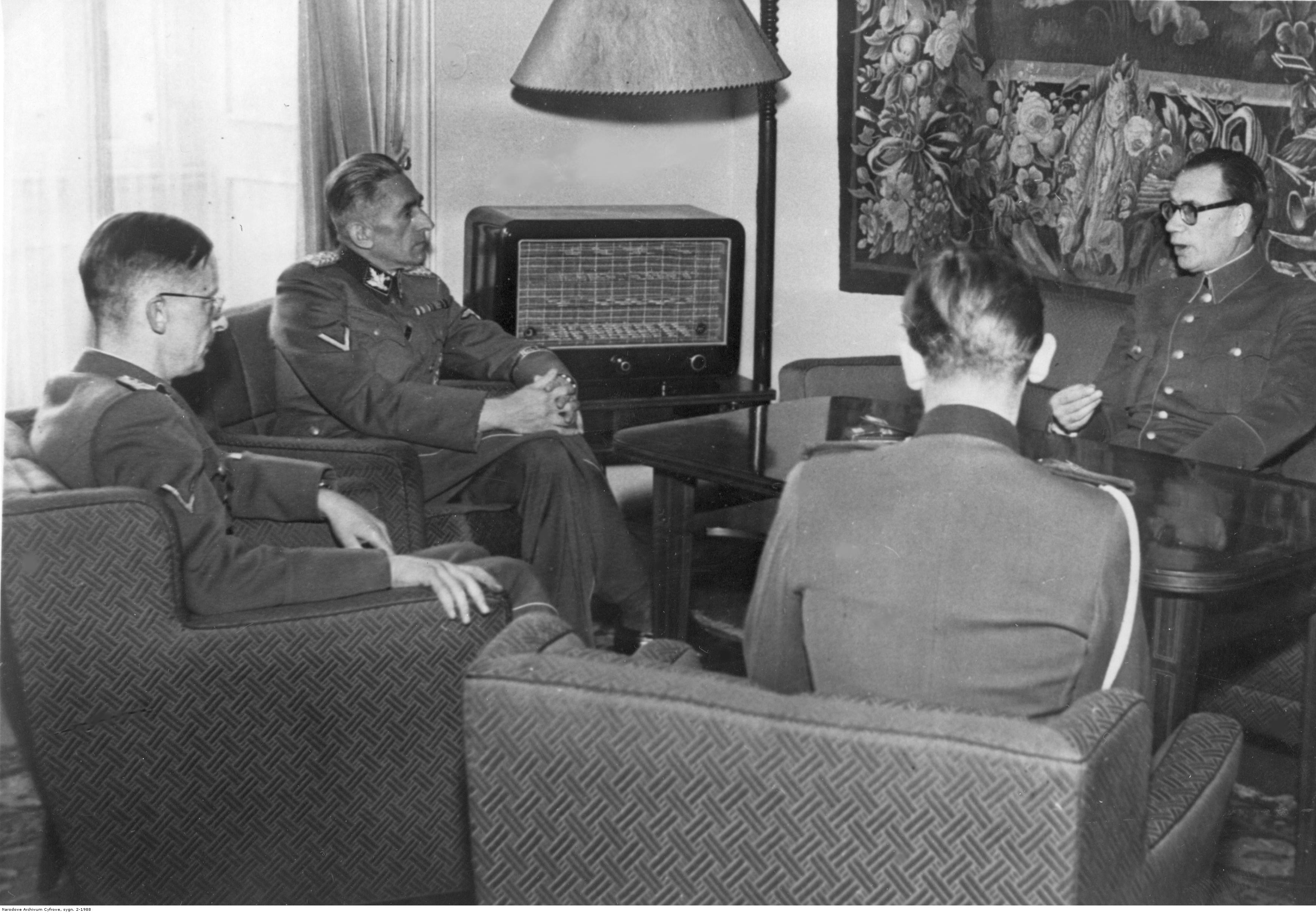
KONR's first session. Prague, 14 November 1944

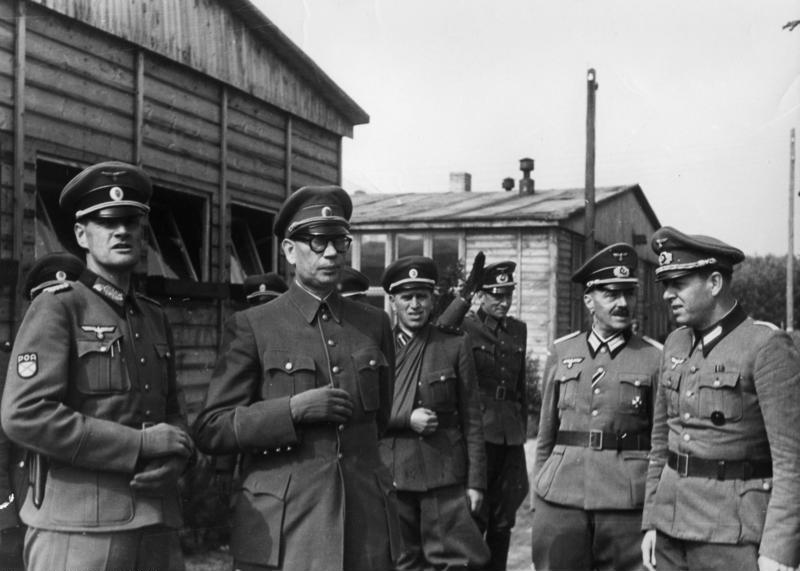
Camp Dabendorf: General Vlasov (2nd from left), General Trochin (1st from left) among German and ROA officers, 1944

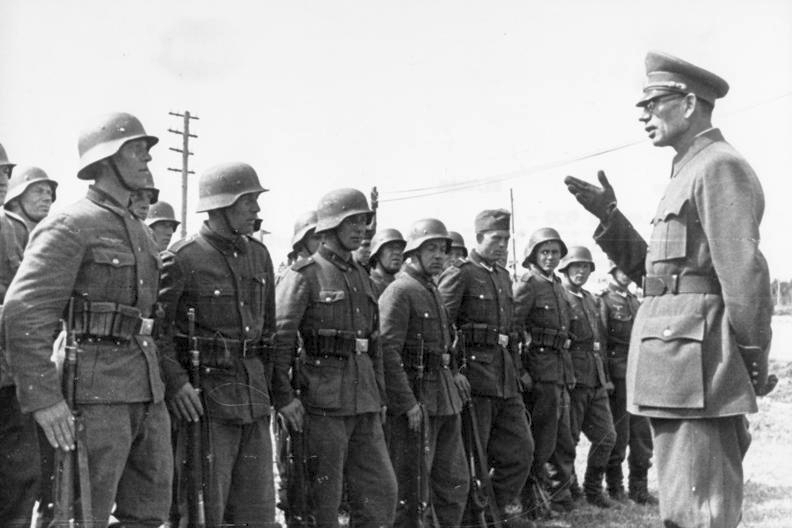
Vlasov inspects soldiers of the ROA, 1944

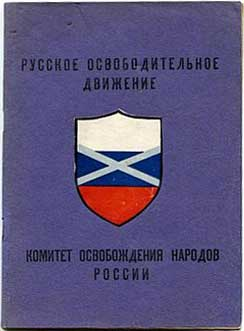
Brochure of the Committee for the Liberation of the Peoples of Russia

== Sources ==
- Andreyev, Catherine (1987). Vlasov and the Russian Liberation Movement. Cambridge University Press. ISBN 978-0-521-38960-0.
- Dallas, Gregor (2005). 1945. Yale University Press. ISBN 978-0-300-11988-6.

== See also ==
- Anti-Bolshevik Bloc of Nations
- National Committee for a Free Germany
- Russian Liberation Movement
- Ukrainian National Committee
