= Sergei Bunyachenko =

Soviet defector (1902–1946)

- Серге́й Кузьмич Буняченко
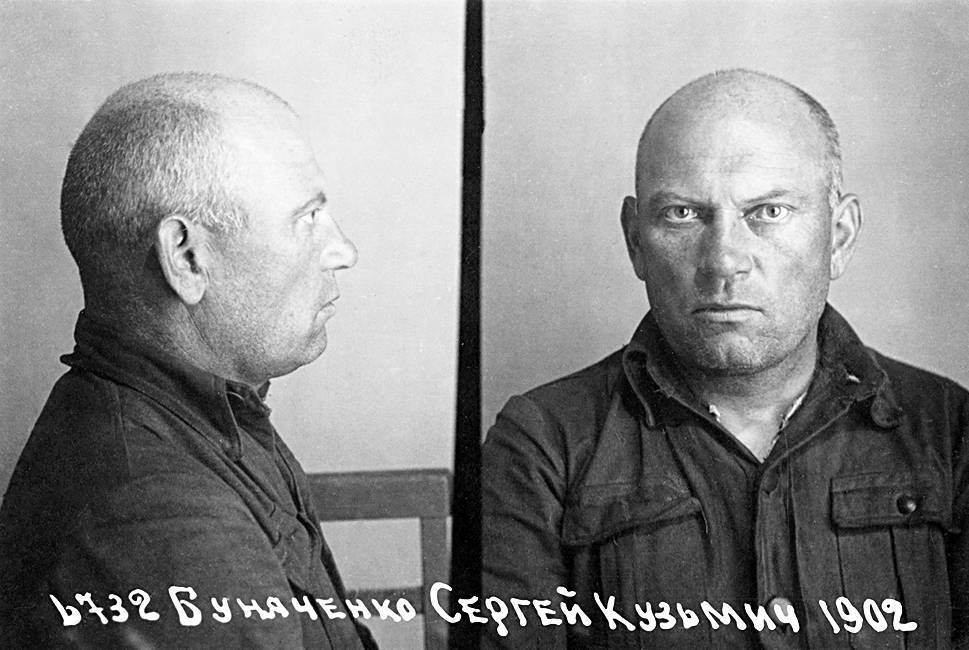
- Bunyachenko after being captured by Soviet forces
- Born: Sergei Kuzmich Bunyachenko; 5 October 1902; Korovyakovka, Kursk Governorate, Russian Empire
- Died: 1 August 1946 (aged 43); Moscow, Russian SFSR, Soviet Union
- Cause of death: Execution by hanging
- Military career
- Allegiance: Soviet Union; Nazi Germany; KONR
- Branch: Red Army; Russian Liberation Army
- Service years: 1918–1945
- Rank: Major General
- Commands: 389th Rifle Division; 59th Independent Rifle Brigade; 600th Infantry Division
- Conflicts: Russian Civil War; Soviet–Japanese Border Wars; Battle of Lake Khasan; World War II; Prague Uprising

Sergei Kuzmich Bunyachenko (Russian: Серге́й Кузьми́ч Буняче́нко, Ukrainian: Сергі́й Кузьми́ч Буняче́нко; 5 October 1902 – 1 August 1946) was a Soviet Red Army defector to the German side during World War II and a major general in the collaborationist Russian Liberation Army (ROA). He was convicted of treason and hanged in 1946.

== Early career ==
Bunyachenko was born to a poor peasant family of Ukrainian origin in the Kursk Governate (modern day Kursk Oblast). In April 1918, at the age of 15, he enlisted in the Red Army and fought in the Russian Civil War in Ukraine as an infantryman. He joined the Communist Party in 1919, and graduated from the Odessa Military Academy in 1923. After graduation, he was promoted to the rank of assistant company commander, and fought against the Basmachi Revolt in Central Asia. He was awarded a badge "For Military Merit" by the Tajik Soviet Socialist Republic. He continued to serve in Soviet Central Asia into 1930. From 1932 to 1935, he studied at the Frunze Military Academy, and afterwards was promoted to chief of staff of the 78th separate regiment.

== Senior officer of the Soviet Union ==
In 1937, Bunyachenko was expelled from the Communist Party for criticizing agricultural collectivization policies conducted by the Soviet Union, especially in Ukraine. This removal was later downgraded to a severe reprimand under unknown circumstances.

Bunyachenko was appointed the assistant chief of staff of the 39th Rifle Corps, and fought in 1938 at the Battle of Lake Khasan.

In 1942, Bunyachenko was appointed the commander of the 389th Infantry Division, which was engaged in fighting on the Transcaucasian Front. While in this post, in August 1942, Bunyachenko was ordered to detonate a bridge across the Terek River near the Mozdok-Chervtyonoe region. He followed orders as given, but some units of the Red Army had not yet crossed the river and were cut off from the main defensive formation. In the aftermath, Bunyachenko was arrested and put on trial.

In September 1942, Bunyachenko was sentenced to death by a military tribunal. His sentence was later commuted to 10 years in a gulag, to be served after the end of the war, and was reinstated as an officer. He was then appointed the commander of the 59th rifle brigade, which had lost over 35% of its personnel in combat prior to his command. By November 1942, the brigade was functionally destroyed. Bunyachenko was blamed for the loss of the brigade, and was threatened with a new arrest.

== Capture and service in the Russian Liberation Army ==
In December 1942, Bunyachenko was captured by a reconnaissance group of the 2nd Romanian Infantry Division, 25 km west of Vladikavkaz. He was held in a concentration camp in Crimea and Kherson from his capture until June 1943. In May, he applied to join the Russian Liberation Army, a collaborationist anti-Communist force led by General Andrey Vlasov.

By September 1943, he had been approved to serve as a communications officer in the headquarters of the German 7th Army in Le Mans, in the Sarthe department. In June and July 1944, he led a combined regiment of two Eastern battalions in a defense against Operation Overlord in an unknown portion of the French coast. He was awarded the Iron Cross 2nd class for his actions on the Western Front. On 10 November 1944 he was promoted to commander of the 600th Infantry Division (1st Infantry Division of the ROA), leading a total of twenty thousand soldiers and auxiliary personnel.

In February 1945 Bunyachenko was promoted to Major General, and was rotated to the Eastern front in March. In Mid-April he participated in Operation: April Weather, an effort to defend the Oder River, which today marks the German-Polish border, from the encroaching Red Army. When Operation: April Weather failed, General Bunyachenko ordered his troops to withdraw from the river into Czechia on 16 April.

One source alleges that Vlasov and Bunyachenko together intended to muster the ROA in Slovenia and strike against Josip Tito's partisans. This source states that the ROA intended to retake Slovenia and portions of Croatia and Northern Bosnia and establish a "White Yugoslavia" which would be friendly to the Allies and particularly America in the war's aftermath. This source is not corroborated, and should be treated with skepticism. It is, however, a matter of historical record that the ROA and Bunyachenko defected from the Nazis and attempted to align themselves to the Western Allies as the fall of the Third Reich approached.

== The Prague Uprising ==
As Bunyachenko's division marched from the front lines, the commanders signed an agreement with the partisans who led the Prague Uprising on 4 May 1945. Bunyachenko's soldiers entered open battle against the Germans on 6 May, and were ordered to attack again on 7 May. By that evening, the Czech National Council requested that the ROA leave Prague due to the influence of Soviet-aligned Communists on the council. Bunyachenko then withdrew to the West, towards the American frontlines.

== Imprisonment by Soviet authorities ==
On 12 May, Bunyachenko received information that the American forces would not accept the official surrender of his division. In response, he disbanded the division. On 15 May, he and the division headquarters surrendered to the Americans. Due to a previous agreement between the Soviet and American governments that any Soviet citizens would be transferred to Soviet custody, Bunyachenko and his men, including White Russians who did not hold Soviet citizenship, were sent to the Soviet lines as prisoners of war.

== Prison, trial, and execution ==
After his surrender, Bunyachenko was held in the Butyrsky prison in Moscow. His trial was held concurrently with other members of the Committee for the Liberation of the People of Russia and the ROA in the "Trial of the Suspected Vlasovites". The Trial was held in the Military Collegium of the Supreme Court of the USSR from 30 July to 1 August 1946. The Presiding Members were Vasiliy Ulrikh, F.F Karavaikov, and G. N Danilova. The defendants were described in Soviet newspapers as "German intelligence agents who carried out active espionage, sabotage, and terrorist activities against the Soviet Union."

All twelve individuals in the trial were charged with terrorism, wrecking, anti-Soviet agitation, criminal conspiracy, and High Treason. The trials were held in secret, without the participation of the accused. The Politburo had already directed the Collegium to pursue the death penalty on 23 July, a week before the trial began. All twelve defendants were found guilty, including Bunyachenko, and were executed by hanging on 1 August 1946. Each executed was cremated by the NKVD, and their ashes were poured into the moat of Donskoy Monastery.

On 1 November 2001 the Military Collegium of the Russian Federation overturned the convictions of anti-Soviet agitation for all defendants, including Bunyachenko. The remaining four charges were upheld.
