= 600th Infantry Division =

Russian unit that fought for Nazi Germany

600th (Russian) Infantry Division
- German: 600. (russische) Infanterie-Division
- RLA chevron
- Active: December 1944 – May 1945
- Country: Nazi Germany
- Branch: Heer (Wehrmacht)
- Role: Infantry
- Size: Division
- Engagements: World War II; Operation «April Weather»; Prague uprising

The 600th (Russian) Infantry Division, 1st lnfantry Division of the ROA (KONR) was a military division that was formed by the German Army during the World War II. It drew its men from Russian prisoners of war and forced laborers.

== History ==
The division was established on 1 December 1944 and was also known as the 1st Infantry Division of the Russian Liberation Army. The division was built up in Münsingen and was formally part of the Ersatzheer, the reserve army of the Wehrmacht, during the build-up period. On 28 January 1945, when construction was completed, the command was handed over to the Committee for the Liberation of the Peoples of Russia (KONR), which was granted the status of ally. In Andrey Vlasov, the army of the KONR, the VS KONR, had its own commander-in-chief and thus an independent position with regard to the Wehrmacht.

At the beginning of May the division stopped in the Czech village of Kozojedy, about 50 kilometres east of Prague. Here, Bunyachenko was approached by representatives of the Czech resistance, who prepared an uprising in Prague to expel the Germans from the city. The uprising broke out on May 5 and was assisted by the 1st Division the next day without the knowledge of Vlasov. In the fighting with German troops, around 300 soldiers from the division were killed. Although thanks to the Russians most of the city could be freed, their help aroused the anger of the Czech Communists, who demanded that they surrender to the Red Army.

On 7 May, the division withdrew westward from Prague. The next day Germany capitulated. The division attempted to surrender to the Americans, who, under the Yalta Agreements, handed them over to the Soviet Union. Rank-and-file troops were convicted of treason and sent to the Gulag camps. Bunyachenko was hanged after a trial, just like the other KONR leaders, on 1 August 1946.

== Commanders ==
- Generalleutnant Sergei Bunyachenko: 10 November 1944 – 8 May 1945

== See also ==
- Ostlegionen

== Sources ==
- 600. Infanterie-Division - Article on www.lexikon-der-wehrmacht.de
- 600. Infanterie-Division - Article on Axishistory.com
