= We Are Marching in Wide Fields =

Song

"We Are Marching in Wide Fields" (Note: Russian: Мы идём широкими полями, romanized: My idyóm shirókimi polyámi) was the march of the Russian Liberation Army (RLA), which fought in World War II on the side of Nazi Germany. The text was written in June 1943 by Anatoly Flaume (under the pseudonym A. Florov), Mikhail Davydov wrote the music. The song was recorded in Berlin in the propaganda department of the "Vineta" of the Reich Ministry of Public Enlightenment and Propaganda.

== History ==
Flaume, an ethnic Latvian whose family emigrated from Russia to Latvia after the Russian Civil War, studied at the Faculty of Philology of the University of Latvia, was a member of the student society "Ruthenia". He based the march of the RLA on his poem "The One Who Is Faithful to Our Motto", published in Riga in 1939 in the poetry collection "The Songbook of Ruthenia". According to historian Boris Ravdin, the song is poetically and meaningfully superior to the earlier marches of collaborators. The Germans distributed the text of the march on leaflets and posters. The "Songbook of a Volunteer", published in 1943 in Narva, contains the march's sheet music. The song was first performed on June 22, 1943, on Pskov radio during a parade in which the 1st Guards Brigade of the Russian Liberation Army took part. The leader of the People's Labor Union Rostislav Polchaninov, who visited occupied Pskov in 1943, recalled that after the arrival of General Andrey Vlasov in the city, the local radio station played the march of the RLA daily.

== Lyrics ==
Мы идём широкими полями,

На восходе утренних лучей.

Мы идём на бой с большевиками

За свободу Родины своей!

Refrain : 𝄆 Марш вперёд, железными рядами,

В бой за Родину, за наш народ!

Только вера двигает горами,

Только смелость города берёт! 𝄇

Мы идём вдоль тлеющих пожарищ,

По развалинам родной страны.

Приходи и ты к нам в полк, товарищ,

Если любишь Родину, как мы.

Refrain

Мы идём, нам дальний путь не страшен,

Не страшна суровая война.

Твердо верим мы в победу нашу,

И твою, любимая страна!

Refrain

We are marching in wide fields,

At the rising of morning's rays

We're going to battle against the Bolsheviks

For the freedom of the homeland!

Refrain: 𝄆 March Forward, in iron ranks

to battle for the motherland for our people

Only faith moves mountains

only courage takes cities 𝄇

We're walking alongside smoldering fires

Among the ruins of our native country

You come join our regiment, Comrade

if you love the homeland like we do.

Refrain

We're walking, not afraid of the long journey,

nor afraid of the harsh war.

we firmly believe in our victory,

and yours, beloved country!

Refrain
