= Union for the Struggle for the Liberation of the Peoples of Russia =

Anti-communist Russian organization

The Union for the Struggle for the Liberation of the Peoples of Russia (In Russian: Soyuz' Bor'bi za Osvobozhdeniye Narodov Rossii, Союз Борьбы за Освобождение Народов России, abbreviated as SBONR, СБОНР) was an organization of anti-communist Russians, regardless of ethnic origin, which emerged from the youth organization of the Committee for the Liberation of the Peoples of Russia. It mostly contained participants of the Russian Liberation Movement (the so-called "second wave" of Russian émigrés) and its sympathisers, but also included several White émigrés.

The SBONR tended to orient itself on the principles of the Prague Manifesto, which made it seem relatively left wing in comparison to White émigré organizations, and tried to support the cause of non-Russian ethnic groups of Russia. In addition to political activism, the SBONR published information on the history of the Russian Liberation Army.

== See also ==
- Russian Liberation Movement
- Committee for the Liberation of the Peoples of Russia
- American Committee for the Liberation of the Peoples of Russia
