= 650th Infantry Division =

650. (Russische) Infanterie-Division
- RLA chevron
- Active: January 1945 – May 1945
- Country: Soviet Union
- Allegiance: KONR; Nazi Germany
- Branch: Heer (Wehrmacht)
- Engagements: World War II

The 650th (Russian) Infantry Division, 2nd lnfantry Division of the ROA (KONR) was a military division that was formed by the German Army during World War II. It drew its men mainly from Russian prisoners of war.

== History ==
The division was established on 10 January 1945 and was also known as the 2nd Infantry Division of the Russian Liberation Army. Just like the 1st KONR Infantry Division, the 2nd Division was initially part of the Ersatzheer, but on 28 January 1945, command over both divisions was transferred to the Committee for the Liberation of the Peoples of Russia (KONR), which was given the status of ally.

The 2nd division was then still in the construction phase and never achieved its full strength. In contrast to the 1st Division, which was built around a core of Russian veterans of the Wehrmacht and the Waffen-SS, the 2nd Division consisted mainly of recently defected Red Army soldiers, and never saw any real combat action.

In May 1945, Vlasov regrouped his Russian Liberation Army in the area between Linz and České Budějovice, to surrender to the Americans. In spite of international law, the US extradited the Russians to the Soviet Union, where the soldiers ended up in Gulag camps. Division commander Zverev was hanged after a short trial, just like the other KONR leaders, on 1 August 1946.

== Commanders ==
- Generalmajor Grigory Zverev: 10 January 1945 – 8 May 1945

== See also ==
- Ostlegionen

== Sources ==
- 650. Infanterie-Division - Article on www.lexikon-der-wehrmacht.de
- 650. Infanterie-Division - Article on Axishistory.com
