= Prague uprising =

Partially successful 1945 rebellion in German-occupied Czechoslovakia

- Part of the Eastern Front of World War II and May Uprising of the Czech people
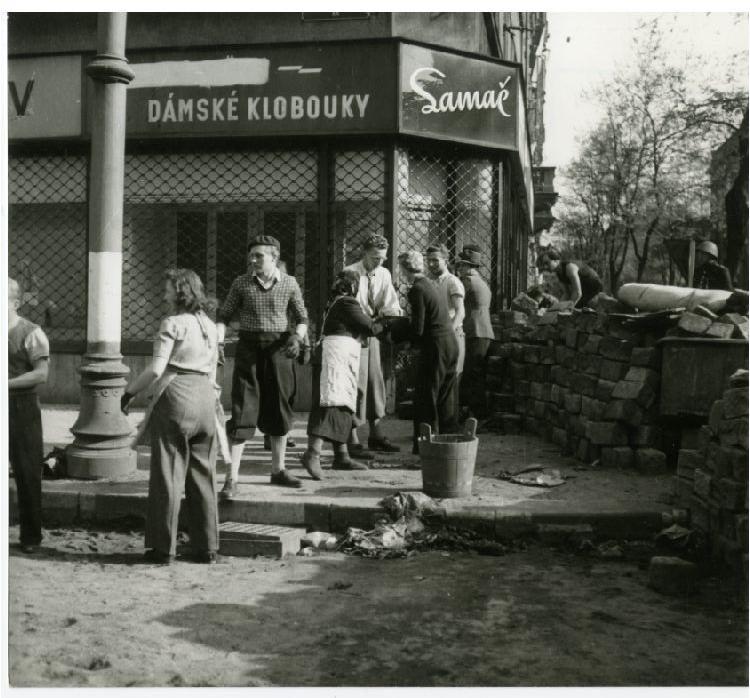
- Prague residents putting up a barricade, 6 May. In the background, a German-language sign has been painted over.
Date	5–9 May 1945
Location	Prague, Bohemia and Moravia 50°04′43″N 14°26′04″E
Result	Inconclusive

Belligerents
(Czechoslovakia) Czech resistance Russian Liberation Army	Germany: Bohemia and Moravia

Commanders and leaders
(Czechoslovakia) Karel Kutlvašr; Sergei Bunyachenko	Karl Hermann Frank; Rudolf Toussaint; Carl Friedrich von Pückler-Burghauss

Strength
30,000 insurgents (Note: A few thousand of these were policemen from the Prague police and gendarmerie as well as soldiers from the 1st Battalion of the Government Army, all of whom were lightly armed. The remainder were civilians, mostly young men with no prior military training. Numerous female civilians fought in the uprising, while others were escaped Allied prisoners of war (some of whom were Soviet, British, French and Dutch) or Jews who had escaped from Nazi concentration camps.); 18,000 Russian Liberation Army	40,000 (Note: Approximately 10,000 of these were Waffen-SS troops who were sent to Prague after the start of the uprising. The remainder included regular Wehrmacht infantry, Luftwaffe personnel from the disbanded I Flak Corps, Hitler Youth members and armed German civilians.); Several aircraft

Casualties and losses
1,694–2,898 insurgents killed (Note: The lower figure is the official estimate published in 1946. Only casualties whose identity could be verified were included. The higher figure is argued by Marek.); 3,000 insurgents wounded 300 ROA soldiers killed and wounded (Note: Bunyachenko stated that ROA casualties in the uprising were 300 killed or wounded, but MacDonald suggests that this may have been "exaggerated for political purposes" as Bunyachenko was trying to avoid being handed over into Soviet captivity.)	1,000–2,000 killed (Note: These figures in theory included civilian casualties. However, Staněk considers the total number of Germans killed during the uprising to be well above 1,000.)
- 263–2,000 Czech civilians killed 1,000+ German civilians killed (Note: The official figure of 1,000 German civilian casualties is "almost certainly an underestimate, especially considering the scope and nature of the violence that took place in and around the city, and doesn't take into account official attempts to play down the violence against civilians." For example, of 300 Germans buried in a mass grave in a suburb of Prague, three-quarters were classified as military casualties despite the fact that a majority were wearing civilian clothes.)

The Prague uprising (Czech: Pražské povstání) was a partially successful attempt by the Czech resistance movement to liberate the city of Prague from German occupation in May 1945, during the end of World War II. The preceding six years of occupation had fuelled anti-German sentiment and the rapid advance of Allied forces from the Red Army and the United States Army offered the resistance a chance of success.

On 5 May 1945, during the end of World War II in Europe, occupying German forces in Bohemia and Moravia were spontaneously attacked by civilians in an uprising, with Czech resistance leaders emerging from hiding to join them. The Russian Liberation Army (ROA), a collaborationist formation formed from former Soviet prisoners of war, defected and supported the insurgents. German forces counter-attacked, but their progress was slowed by barricades constructed by the insurgents. On 8 May, the Czech and German leaders signed a ceasefire allowing all German forces to withdraw from the city, but some Waffen-SS troops refused to obey. Fighting continued until 9 May, when the Red Army entered the nearly liberated city.

The uprising was brutal, with both sides committing several war crimes. German forces used Czech civilians as human shields and perpetrated several massacres. Violence against German civilians, sanctioned by the Czechoslovak government-in-exile, continued after the uprising, and was justified as revenge for the occupation or as a means to encourage Germans to flee. George S. Patton's Third United States Army was ordered by Supreme Allied Commander Dwight D. Eisenhower not to come to the aid of the Czech insurgents, which undermined the credibility of the Western powers in post-war Czechoslovakia. Instead, the uprising was presented as a symbol of Czech resistance to Nazi rule, and the Red Army's role in liberating the city was used by the Communist Party of Czechoslovakia to increase popular support for the party.

== Background ==
=== German occupation ===
In 1938, the Chancellor of Germany, Adolf Hitler, announced his intention to annex the Sudetenland, a region of Czechoslovakia with a high ethnic German population. British Prime Minister Neville Chamberlain and French Prime Minister Édouard Daladier acquiesced to Hitler's demands at the Munich Agreement, in exchange for guarantees from Nazi Germany that no additional lands would be annexed. No Czechoslovak representatives were present at the negotiations. In March 1939, German forces invaded and occupied the remaining Czech territories, establishing the Protectorate of Bohemia and Moravia. Although France had a defensive alliance with Czechoslovakia, neither the French nor British intervened militarily.

The Nazis considered many Czechs to be racially Aryan, and therefore suitable for Germanisation. As a consequence, the German occupation was less harsh than in other predominantly Slavic nations, with wartime living standards being actually higher than in Germany itself. However, freedom of speech was curtailed by the occupational government and 400,000 Czechs were conscripted for forced labour programs in Nazi Germany. During the six-year occupation, more than 20,000 Czechs were executed by German forces and thousands more died in concentration camps. While the general violence of the occupation was much less severe than in Eastern Europe, it nevertheless incited violent anti-German sentiment in many Czechs.

=== Military situation ===
Positions of armies on 6 May 1945; Soviet forces in red, German in gray, and United States in green

During the spring of 1945, partisan forces in Bohemia and Moravia totalled about 120 groups, with a combined strength of around 7,500 people. Partisans disrupted the railway and highway transportation by sabotaging track and bridges and attacking trains and stations. Some railways could not be used at night or on some days, and trains were forced to travel at a slower speed. Waffen-SS units retreating from the Red Army's advance into Moravia burned down several villages in reprisal. Despite losing much of their leadership to a March 1945 purge by the Gestapo, Communist groups in Prague distributed propaganda leaflets calling for an insurrection. German soldiers and civilians became increasingly worried and prepared to flee violent retaliation for the occupation. In an attempt to reassert German authority, SS police official Karl Hermann Frank broadcast a message over the radio threatening to destroy Prague and drown any opposition in blood.

In early 1945, former Czechoslovak Army officers set up the Bartoš Command commanded by General Karel Kutlvašr to oversee fighting inside Prague, and the Alex Command under General František Slunečko to direct insurgent units in the suburbs. Meanwhile, the Czech National Council, with representatives from various Czech political parties, formed to take over political leadership after the overthrow of the Nazi occupational government and the collaborationist authorities. Military leaders planning an uprising within Prague counted on the loyalty of ethnically Czech members of the city police, gendarmerie and the Government Army of the Protectorate of Bohemia and Moravia, as well as employees of key civil services, such as transport workers and the fire brigade. The 1st Infantry Division of the Russian Liberation Army (ROA), composed of Soviet prisoners of war who had agreed to fight for Germany, was stationed outside of Prague. Hoping that the ROA could be persuaded to switch sides in order to avoid accusations of collaboration with Nazi Germany, the Czech military command sent an envoy to General Sergei Bunyachenko, the commander of the 600th Infantry Division. Bunyachenko agreed to switch sides to help the Czech resistance. As the ROA soldiers were wearing German uniforms, it was decided that they would be given Russian white-blue-red flags to distinguish them.

On 4 May, the US Third Army under General George S. Patton entered Czechoslovakia. British Prime Minister Winston Churchill was the only political leader to advocate the liberation of Prague by the Western Allies. In a telegram to General Dwight D. Eisenhower, the Supreme Allied Commander in Europe, Churchill said that "the liberation of Prague...by US troops might make the whole difference to the postwar situation of Czechoslovakia and might well influence that in nearby countries." Joseph Stalin, leader of the Soviet Union, wanted Soviet forces to take the city, and asked that the Americans stop at Plzeň, 50 miles (80 km) to the west. The Red Army was planning a major offensive into the Protectorate, due to start 7 May. Eisenhower, disinclined to accept American casualties or risk antagonising the Soviet Union, acquiesced to the Soviet demands that the Red Army enter Prague.

== Uprising ==
=== 5 May ===
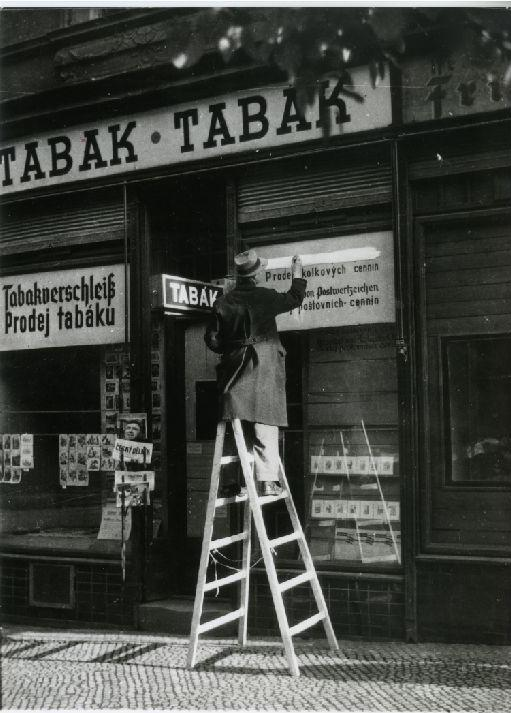
Prague shop owner painting over German-language signage on 4 May

Staff of Czech Radio opposed to the occupation began the morning by broadcasting in the banned Czech language. The Bartoš Command and Communist groups met separately and both scheduled the armed uprising to begin 7 May. Czech citizens gathered in the streets, vandalised German inscriptions, and tore down German flags. Czechoslovak flags appeared openly in windows and on jacket lapels. Tram operators refused to accept Reichsmark or to give the stops in German, as was required by the occupiers. Some German soldiers were surrounded and killed. In response to growing popular agitation, Frank threatened to shoot Czechs gathering in the streets, and increased armed German patrols. Some German soldiers began to fire into the crowds.

Around noon, the radio broadcast a series of appeals to the police and gendarmerie requesting aid in fighting SS guards inside the radio building. A detachment of Government Army policemen responded to the call, and met stiff resistance as they retook the building. During the entire time, the radio continued to broadcast. Although not directed at the populace, the appeal ignited fighting all over the city, concentrated in the downtown districts. Crowds of unarmed civilians, mostly young men with no military training, overwhelmed German garrisons and stores. Many casualties were inflicted by German soldiers and civilians sniping from strong-points or rooftops; in response, Czech forces began to intern Germans and suspected collaborators. Czech noncombatants assisted by setting up makeshift hospitals for the wounded and bringing food, water, and other necessities to the barricades, while German forces often resorted to looting to obtain essential supplies. Czech forces seized thousands of firearms, hundreds of Panzerfausts, and five armoured vehicles, but still suffered a shortage of weapons.

By the end of the day, the resistance had seized most of the city east of the Vltava River. The insurgents held many important buildings, including the radio, the telephone exchange, most railway stations, and ten of twelve bridges. Three thousand prisoners were freed from Pankrác Prison. By controlling the telephone exchange, resistance fighters were able to sever communication between German units and commanders. German forces held most of the territory to the west of the river, including an airfield at Ruzyně, northwest of the city, and various surrounded garrisons such as the Gestapo Headquarters.

At the orders of Field Marshal Ferdinand Schörner, in command of Axis forces in Bohemia, Waffen-SS units were pulled from fighting the Red Army and sent into Prague. The SS was relatively well-equipped with tanks, armoured carriers, weaponry and motorised units. Information on this force movement reached insurgent headquarters late in the day. The radio broadcast appeals in English and Russian for an air attack on the tanks. Hearing of events in Prague, Patton asked for permission to advance to the Vltava in order to aid the Czech resistance, but Eisenhower refused. (Note: About this decision, Patton later wrote: "I felt, and I still feel, that we should have gone on to the [Vltava] River and, if the Russians didn't like it, let them go to hell. I did not find out until weeks afterwards the reasons, which were sound, which implemented General Eisenhower's decision...") The Red Army was ordered to advance the launch of its offensive to 6 May.

=== 6 May ===
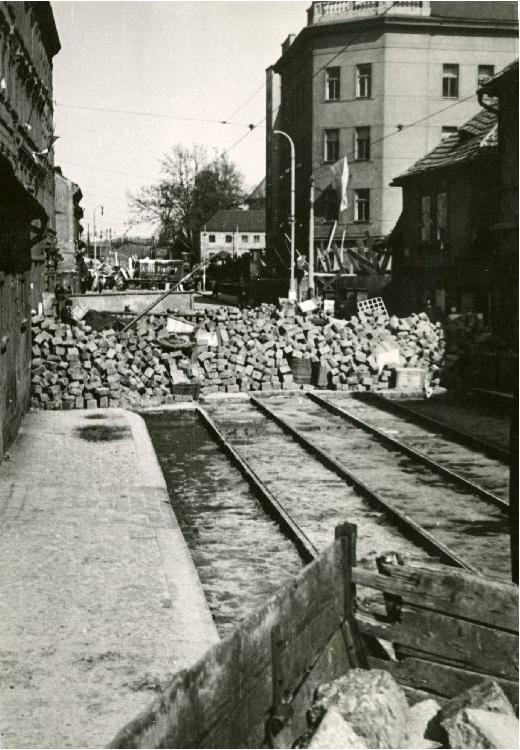
Barricade at Olšany cemetery

Late in the evening on 5 May, the radio broadcast an appeal to the people in the streets of Prague to build barricades in order to slow the anticipated German attack. Despite poor weather, tens of thousands of civilians worked overnight to construct over 1,600 barricades by morning. A total of 2,049 were constructed by the end of the uprising.

SS General Carl Friedrich von Pückler-Burghauss ordered the Luftwaffe to firebomb Prague, but the attack had to be scaled back due to lack of fuel. The first strike was made by two Messerschmitt Me 262A jet fighter-bombers from elements of KG 51 at Ruzyně. One of their targets was the radio building, which was hit by a 250-kg bomb that disabled the transmitter. However, the radio continued to broadcast from alternative locations. In successive attacks, the Luftwaffe bombed barricades and hit apartment buildings with incendiary bombs, causing many civilian casualties.

At midday, the First Battalion of the ROA entered Prague and attacked the Germans; during its time in Prague, it disarmed around 10,000 German soldiers. An American reconnaissance patrol met with an ROA officer as well as Czech leaders. This was when the Czechs learnt of the demarcation line agreement and that the Third Army was not coming to liberate Prague. As a consequence, the Czech National Council, which had not been involved in negotiations with Bunyachenko, denounced the ROA. They could not politically afford to endorse the ROA, whom Stalin considered traitors. Despite the rejection of the ROA, their aid to Prague became a point of friction between Moscow and Czechoslovakia after the war.

=== 7 May ===
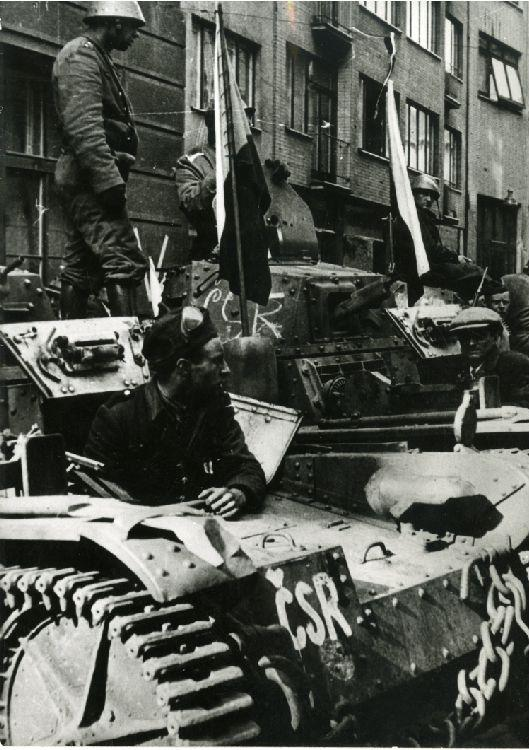
Captured AMR 35 tanks deployed by insurgents on Bartolomějská street in the Old Town

Under the terms of the provisional unconditional surrender, signed in the early hours of 7 May, German forces had a forty-eight-hour grace period to cease offensive operations. Eisenhower hoped that the capitulation would put an end to the fighting in Prague and therefore obviate American intervention. However, the German leadership was determined to use the grace period to move as many soldiers as possible westward to surrender to the Americans. Schörner denounced the rumours of a ceasefire in Prague and said that the truce did not apply to German forces fighting the Red Army or Czech insurgents.

In order to gain control of Prague's transportation network, the Germans launched their strongest attack of the uprising. Waffen-SS armoured and artillery units arriving in Prague gradually punched through the barricades with several tank attacks. Intense fighting was accompanied with the SS use of Czech civilians as human shields and damage to the Old Town Hall and other historic buildings. When the Bartoš Command learnt of the Rheims surrender, it ordered an immediate ceasefire for Czech forces. This caused some confusion among the defenders, who were also suffering from desertion due to the worsening military situation. The ROA played a decisive role in slowing the progress of the Germans, but withdrew from Prague over the afternoon and evening in order to surrender to the US Army. Only a few ROA units stayed in the city, departing late on 8 May. With the bulk of the ROA gone, the poorly armed and untrained Czech insurgents fared badly against the reinforced German forces. By the end of the day, German forces had taken much of the rebel-held territory east of the Vltava, with the resistance only holding a salient in the Vinohrady-Strašnice area. ROA forces captured the Luftwaffe airfield at Ruzyně, destroying several aircraft.

=== 8 May ===
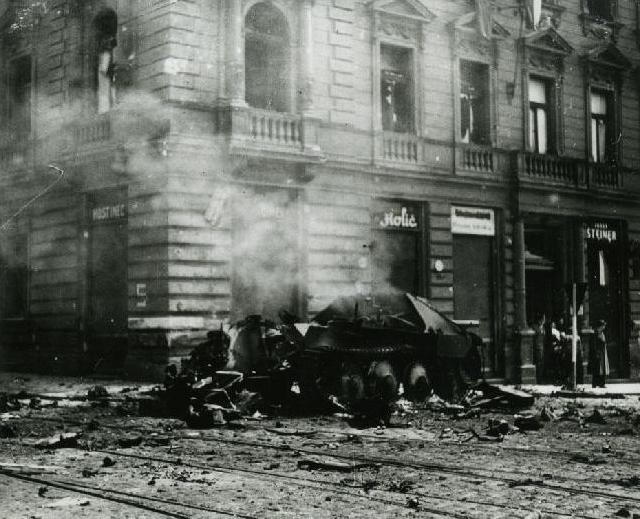
Destroyed German Jagdpanzer 38 in Klárov, 9 May

In the morning, the Germans made an air and artillery bombardment followed by a renewed infantry attack. The fighting was almost as intense as the previous day. One particularly fierce battle took place at the Masaryk train station. At 10 am, SS troops captured the station and murdered around 50 surrendered resistance fighters and noncombatants (cs). (Note: According to the police report, there were 53 victims; Bartošek says that 47 were killed; Pynsent's figure is 58.) In one of the last battles of the uprising, Czech insurgents regained the train station at 2 am on 9 May and photographed the victims' bodies.

Faced with military collapse, no arriving Allied help, and threats to destroy the city, the Czech National Council agreed to negotiate with Wehrmacht General Rudolf Toussaint. Toussaint, running out of time to evacuate Wehrmacht units westward, was in an equally desperate position. After several hours of negotiations, it was agreed that on the morning of 9 May, the Czechs would allow German soldiers to pass westward through Prague, and in exchange German forces leaving the city would surrender their arms. A ceasefire was finally agreed to around midnight. However, some pockets of German forces were unaware of or disobeyed the ceasefire, and civilians feared a continuation of the German atrocities which had intensified over the previous two days. Late in the evening, reports reached Prague of the liberation of Theresienstadt concentration camp, northwest of the city, and the advance of the Red Army into other areas north of Prague.

=== 9 May ===
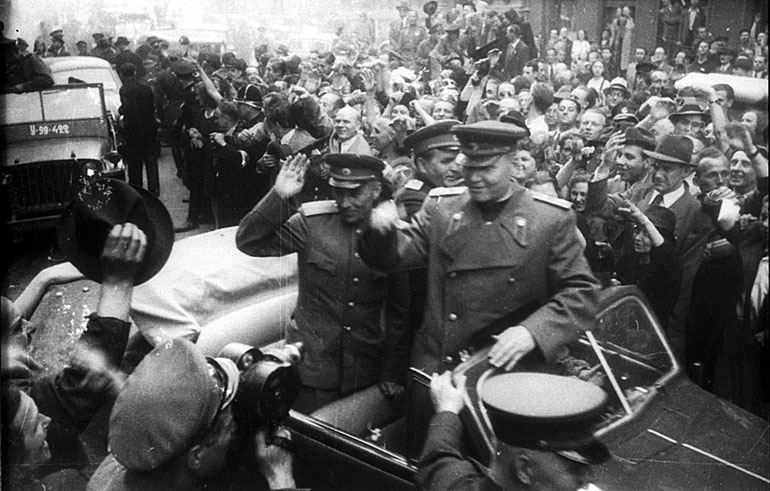
Residents greet Marshal Ivan Konev upon the arrival of the Red Army on 9 May 1945.

The last of the German forces to escape Prague left in the early hours of the morning. At 4:00, elements of the 1st Ukrainian Front reached the suburbs of Prague. Fighting was mostly with isolated SS units that had been prevented from withdrawing by Czech insurgents. Over the next few hours, the Red Army quickly overcame the remaining German forces. Because most of the Germans had already left, the 1st Ukrainian Front avoided the house-to-house fighting that had occurred in the capture of Budapest and Vienna. The Red Army lost only ten soldiers in what has been described as their "easiest victory" of the war. (Note: The offensive that had put the 1st Ukrainian Front in position to liberate Prague was less bloodless, with Soviet forces suffering nearly 50,000 casualties.) At 8:00 am, the tanks reached the centre city and the radio announced the arrival of the Soviet forces. Czechs poured out into the streets to welcome the Red Army.

== War crimes ==
=== German ===
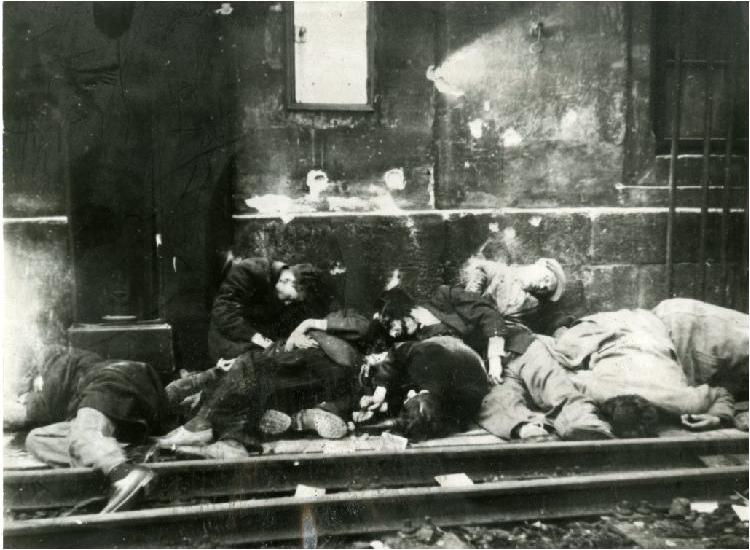
Victims of the massacre at Masaryk station

German forces committed war crimes against Czech civilians throughout the uprising. Many people were killed in summary executions, and the SS used Czech civilians as human shields, forced them to clear barricades at gunpoint, and threatened to shoot hostages in revenge for German soldiers killed in action. When tanks were halted by barricades, they were known to fire into surrounding houses. After violently evicting or murdering the inhabitants, German soldiers looted and burned Czech houses and apartment buildings. On several occasions, more than twenty people were killed at once; most of the massacres occurred on 7 and 8 May. Among those killed were pregnant women and young children, and some of the dead were found mutilated. After the uprising, a Czech police report described war crimes committed by the Nazis:

The doors of houses and flats were burst in, houses and shops were plundered, dwellings were demolished... The inhabitants were driven from their homes and forced to form a living wall with their bodies to protect German patrols, and constantly threatened with automatic pistols... Many Czechs lay dead in the streets.

In addition to the war crimes committed by the Wehrmacht and the SS, Luftwaffe soldiers, along with the SA, participated in the torture and murder of prisoners held at the Na Pražačce school.

=== Czech ===
The Czechoslovak government-in-exile planned to expel the German minority of Czechoslovakia in order to create an ethnically pure Czech-Slovak nation-state. Throughout the occupation, Czech politicians had broadcast messages from London calling for violence against German civilians and suspected Czech collaborators. President Edvard Beneš believed that vigilante justice would be less divisive than trials, and that encouraging Germans to flee would spare the effort of deporting them later. Before he arrived in Czechoslovakia, he broadcast that "everyone who deserves death should be totally liquidated... in the popular storm" and urged the resistance to avenge Nazi crimes "a thousand times over." Minister of Justice Prokop Drtina asked resistance leaders to make liberation "bloody" for the Germans and to drive them out with violence. Communist leaders also supported the violence. Military leaders not only overlooked anti-German massacres and failed to punish the perpetrators, but actively encouraged them. The Czech Radio likely played a role in inciting the violence by passing on the anti-German messages of these political leaders, as well as broadcasting anti-German messages on its own initiative. Almost no one was prosecuted for violence against Germans, and a bill was proposed in the postwar parliament that would have retroactively legalised it.

In Prague, Czech insurgents killed surrendered German soldiers and civilians both before and after the arrival of the Red Army. Historian Robert Pynsent argues that there was no clear-cut distinction between the end of the uprising and the beginning of the expulsions. Some captured German soldiers were hanged from lampposts and burned to death, or otherwise tortured and mutilated. Czech rioters also assaulted, raped, and robbed German civilians. Not all those killed or affected by anti-German violence were actually German or collaborators, as perpetrators frequently acted on suspicion, or exploited the chaos to settle personal grudges. In one massacre at Bořislavka on 10 May, forty German civilians were murdered. During and after the uprising, thousands of German civilians and surrendered soldiers were interned in makeshift camps where food and hygiene were poor. Survivors claimed that beatings and rape were commonplace. The violence against German civilians continued throughout the summer, culminating in the expulsion of Sudeten Germans. About three million Czechoslovak citizens of German ethnicity were stripped of their citizenship and property and forcibly deported.

Historian Mark Levene described the events in the city as a "tidal wave of anti-German mob justice" that he compared to the 1941 anti-Jewish pogroms in eastern Poland, Lithuania, and elsewhere before the arrival of the German army.

== Legacy ==
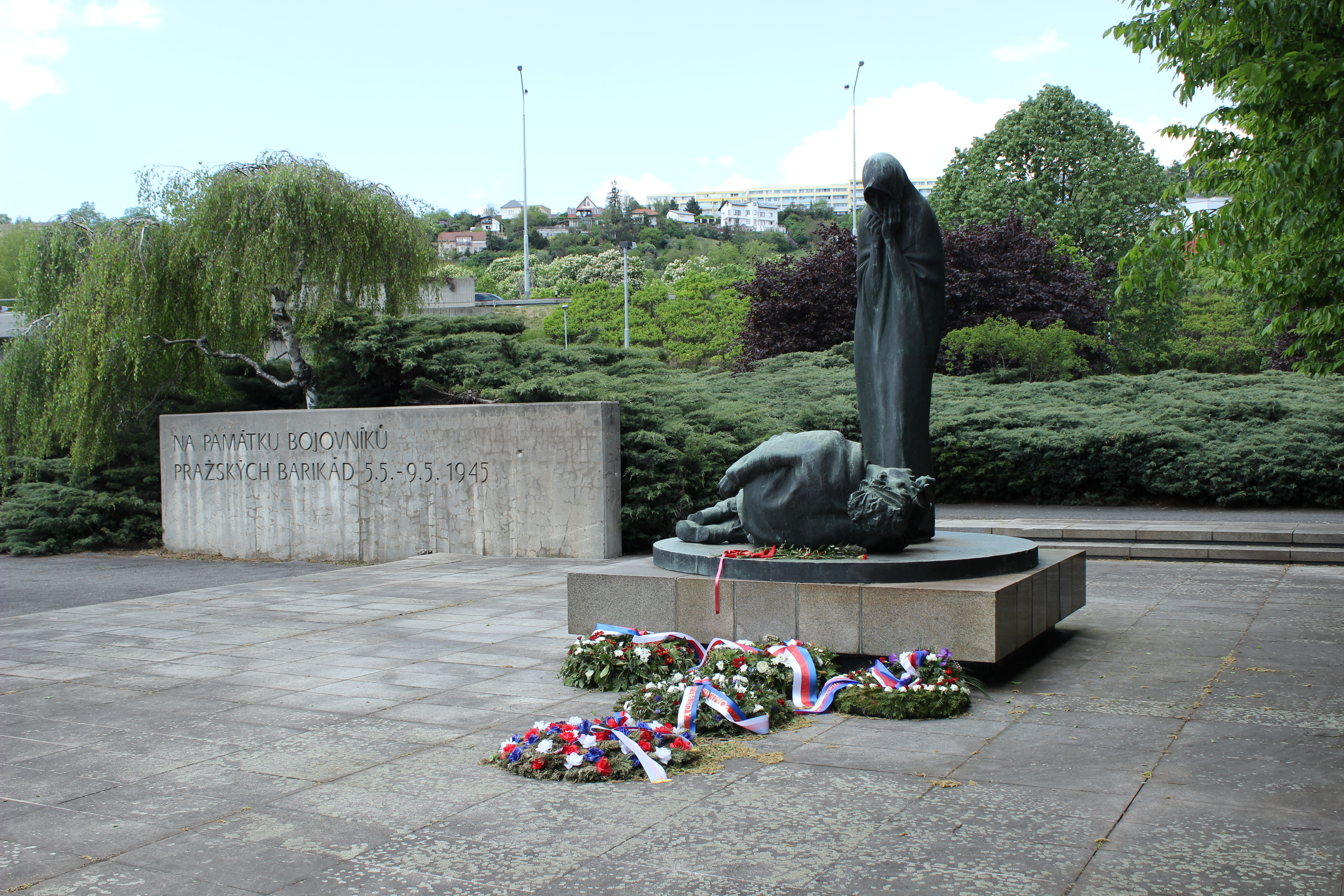
Memorial statue of a fallen barricade defender at Barricade Bridge in Prague.

As "the greatest military action of the Czechs for freedom and national independence fought on their own territory," (Note: Pynsent points out that this is a true but weak statement, because the Czech lands had not been the site of major armed insurrection either before 1945 or afterwards.) in the words of journalist Jindřich Marek, the Prague uprising became a national myth of the new Czechoslovak republic and the subject of much literature.

The Western Allies' failure to liberate Prague was seen as emblematic of their lack of concern for Czechoslovakia, first demonstrated by the Munich Agreement. It also served as a blow to democratic forces within the country who opposed Czechoslovakia's drift towards communism in the years after the war. It was not forgotten that Stalin had opposed the Munich Agreement and the Red Army' entry into Prague turned public opinion in favour of communism. (Note: This took place in spite of multiple instances during the Red Army's advance into the country where Soviet soldiers committed rape and stole from the Czech civilian population.) Few Czechs were aware of the demarcation line agreement between the Western Allied and Soviet forces, allowing communists to accuse the American forces of "having remained a cowardly or cynical onlooker while Prague was struggling for life", in the words of Hungarian historian Stephen Kertesz. According to British diplomat Orme Sargent, the Prague uprising was the moment that "Czechoslovakia was now definitely lost to the West."

In 1948, the government of Czechoslovakia was toppled by a Communist coup d'état. Following the coup, Czechoslovakia became a communist state aligned with the Soviet Union until the Velvet Revolution in 1989. The Communist government attempted to discredit the Czech resistance, which was considered a threat to Communist legitimacy, by purging or arresting former resistance leaders, and distorting history, for instance overstating the role of the working class in the uprising (Note: In fact, the majority of those killed were from the petite bourgeoisie and less than a fifth were working-class.) and inflating the number of Red Army soldiers killed in Prague. (Note: Communist sources give between 400 and 500 Red Army soldiers killed, which is more than an order of magnitude over that estimated by the best sources. Such inflation is often accompanied by rhetoric similar to Bartošek's statement that, on 9 May, "the alliance of the fraternal peoples of the Soviet Union and Czechoslovakia [was] sealed in blood.")
