= Kozojedy (Prague-East District) =

- Municipality
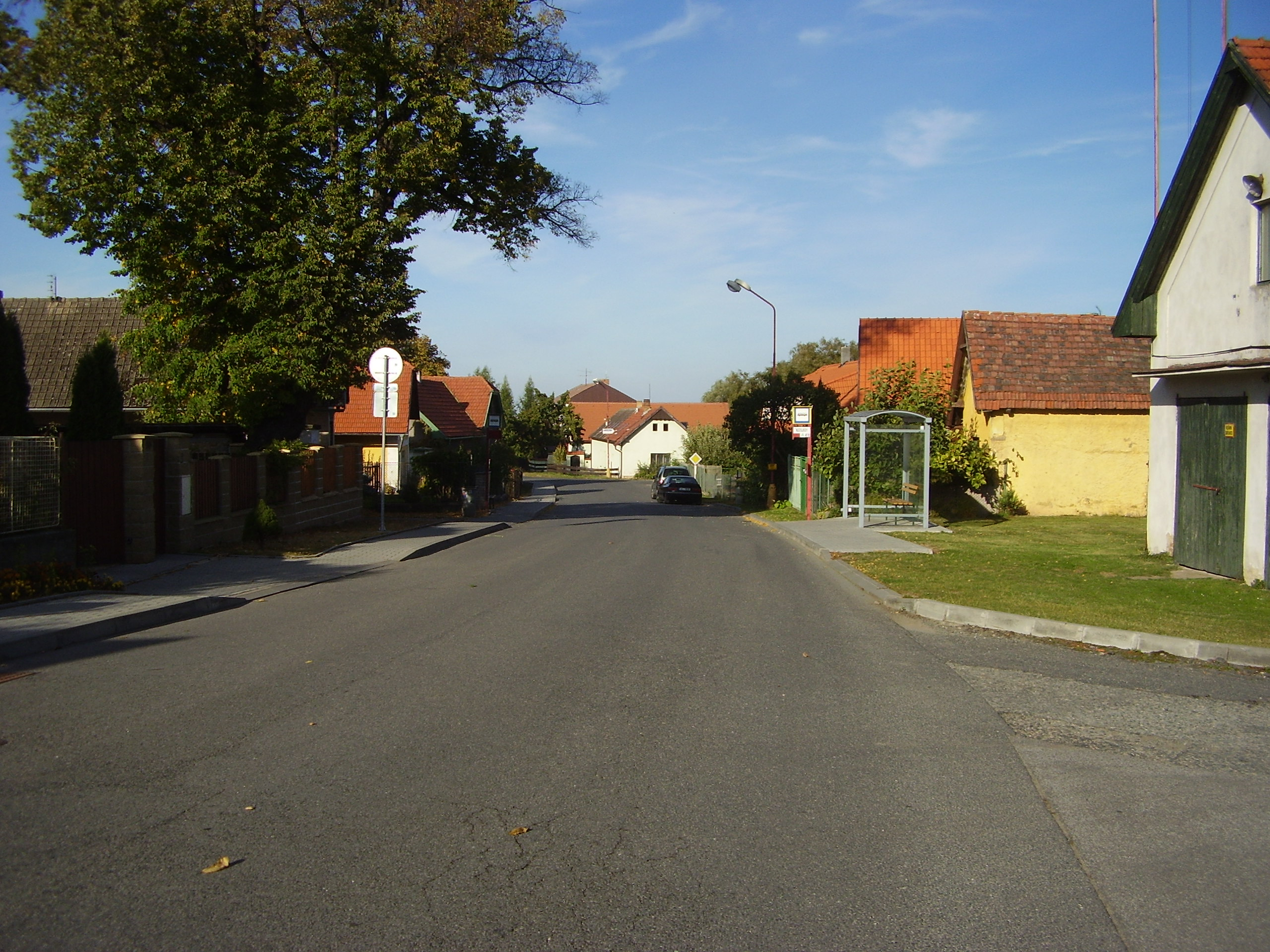
- Main street

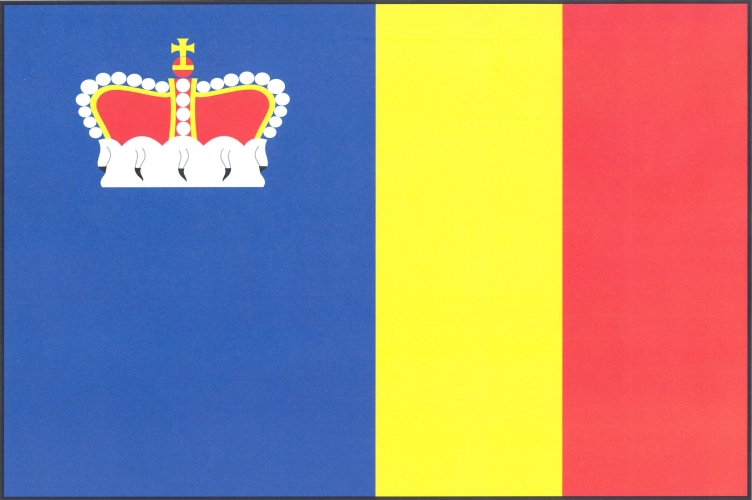
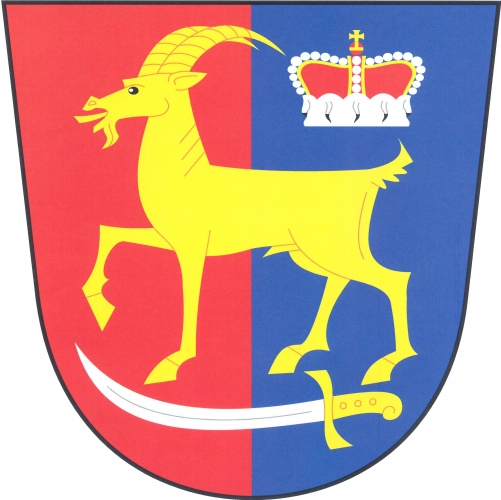
- Flag Coat of arms

- Location in the Czech Republic
- Coordinates: 49°59′50″N 14°48′58″E
- Country: Czech Republic
- Region: Central Bohemian
- District: Prague-East
- First mentioned: 1352

Area
  - Total: 7.18 km^{2} (2.77 sq mi)
- Elevation: 368 m (1,207 ft)

Population (2026-01-01)
  - Total: 1,009
  - Density: 141/km^{2} (364/sq mi)
- Time zone: UTC+1 (CET)
  - Summer (DST): UTC+2 (CEST)
- Postal code: 281 63
- Website: www.obeckozojedy.cz

Kozojedy is a municipality and village in Prague-East District in the Central Bohemian Region of the Czech Republic. It has about 1,000 inhabitants.

== Demographics ==
Historical population
Year	Pop.	±%
1869	522	—
1880	577	+10.5%
1890	577	+0.0%
1900	567	−1.7%
1910	578	+1.9%
1921	545	−5.7%
1930	512	−6.1%
1950	544	+6.2%
1961	512	−5.9%
1970	524	+2.3%
1980	497	−5.2%
1991	506	+1.8%
2001	508	+0.4%
2011	668	+31.5%
2021	956	+43.1%
Source: Censuses
