= Russian Liberation Army =

Nazi Germany military unit mostly composed of Soviet defectors in World War II

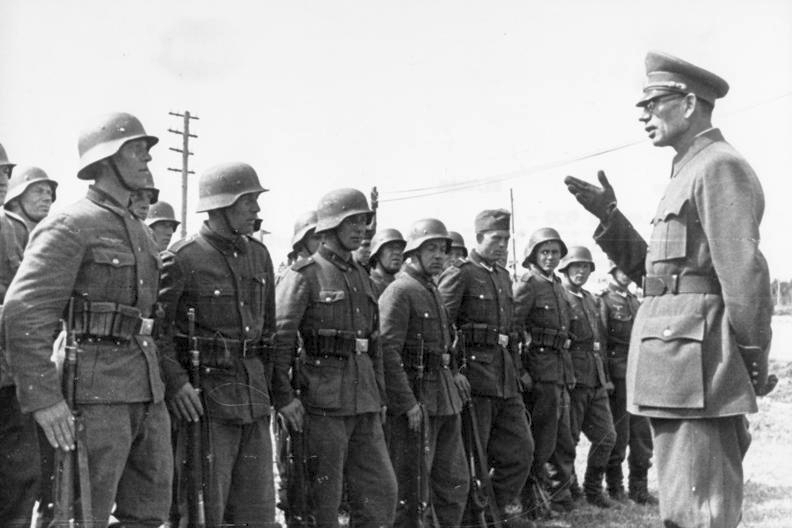
- General Vlasov and soldiers of the RLA
- Active: 1944 – 1945
- Allegiance: Nazi Germany; Committee for the Liberation of the Peoples of Russia (since November 1944)
- Type: Infantry; Air force
- Size: 50,000 to 60,000 troops (1945)
- Nickname: Vlasovites (Vlasovtsy)
- March: We Are Marching in Wide Fields
- Engagements: World War II; Eastern Front; Operation April Weather; Prague uprising; Balkan Campaign; Serbian actions in Slovene Littoral; Operation Winterende

Commanders
- Notable commanders: Andrey Vlasov (since January 1945); Sergei Bunyachenko; Mikhail Meandrov

Insignia
- Badge

- Flags of the KONR and ROA

The Russian Liberation Army (German: Russische Befreiungsarmee; Russian: Русская освободительная армия, romanized: Russkaya osvoboditel'naya armiya, abbr. РОА, ROA), also known as the Vlasov army (Власовская армия, Vlasovskaya armiya) was a collaborationist formation, primarily composed of former Soviet prisoners of war, that fought under German command during World War II. From January 1945, the army was led by Andrey Vlasov, a Red Army general who had defected, and members of the army are often referred to as Vlasovtsy (Russian: Власовцы, lit. 'Vlasovites'). In 1944, it was designated as the Armed Forces of the Committee for the Liberation of the Peoples of Russia (Russian: Вооружённые силы Комитета освобождения народов России, romanized: Vooruzhonnyye sily Komiteta osvobozhdeniya narodov Rossii, abbreviated as Russian: ВС КОНР, romanized: VS KONR).

Vlasov agreed to collaborate with Nazi Germany after having been captured on the Eastern Front. The soldiers of the ROA command were mostly former Soviet prisoners of war but also included some White Russian émigrés, some of whom were veterans of the anti-communist White Army from the Russian Civil War (1917–23) and previously served on the Eastern Front. The political platform of the ROA was formulated mainly by Vlasov and his associates, who were products of Soviet society, so the declared principles of the Vlasovites were anti-capitalist, right of the nations to self-determination and devotion to the ideals of the Russian Revolution of 1917, while they tried to avoid Nazi antisemitism and chauvinism and form a political movement independent of the Nazi control.

The ROA existed only in Nazi propaganda until November 1944, while the Osttruppen ("eastern troops") referred to as "ROA" by the Nazi propaganda served directly under German command and were not formalized as separate units, while the image of Vlasov was a mere propaganda weapon. On 14 November 1944, it was officially formed as the Armed Forces of the Committee for the Liberation of the Peoples of Russia, with the KONR being formed as a political body to which the army pledged loyalty. On 28 January 1945, it was officially declared that the Russian divisions no longer form part of the German Army, but would directly be under the command of KONR, and Vlasov became the commander in chief of the ROA. In May 1945, the 1st division of the ROA, while being the only completed division of the existing three, switched sides and joined the anti-Nazi Prague uprising. The unit's personnel was repatriated to the Soviet Union, where the leadership stood trial and was executed for treason.

== Background ==
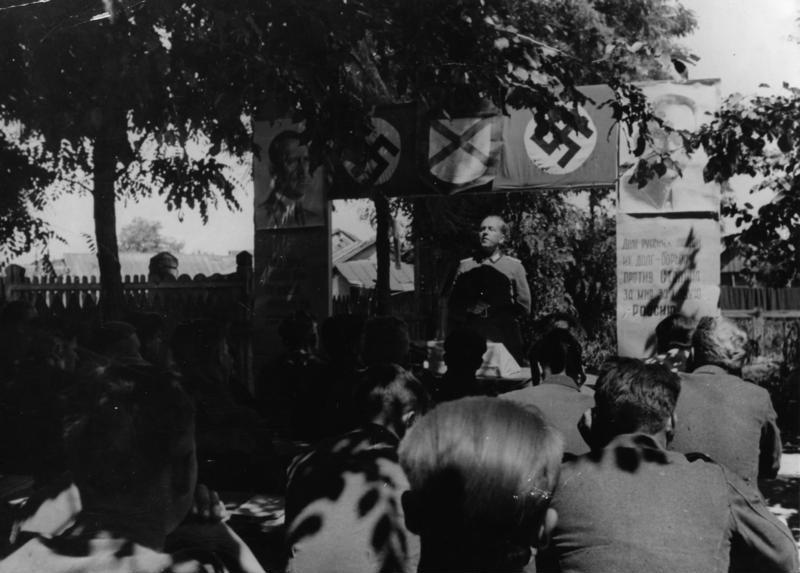
Training classes for recruits, 1944

Many Soviet prisoners of war volunteered to serve under German command just to get out of Nazi POW camps, which were notorious for starving Soviet prisoners to death. By mid-1943 several hundred thousand ex-Soviet Hiwis ("volunteer helpers") were serving in the German forces, either as Hiwis or in Eastern volunteer units, the Osttruppen ("eastern troops"). The latter were generally deployed in a security role at the rear of the armies and army groups in the East, where they constituted a major part of the German effort to counter the activity of Soviet partisan forces, dating as far back as early 1942. The Germans were, however, always concerned about their reliability.

A total of 71 "Eastern" battalions served on the Eastern Front, while 42 battalions served in Belgium, Finland, France, and Italy. Following the German defeats in the summer of 1943 the units began to disintegrate. In the fall of 1943, a scandal embroiled the deployment of eastern troops. Heinrich Himmler, head of the SS, alleged to Hitler that reverses of the summer were attributed to mass desertions from these units. Hitler, enraged, demanded that they be disarmed and used only as laborers, which the army was reluctant to do, due to manpower shortages. A compromise was reached whereas all eastern troops were transferred to the Western front where they were deployed as Wehrmacht coastal defense and security units.

The captured Soviet general Andrey Vlasov, along with his German supporters, lobbied the German High Command for the formation of a real armed force that would be under Russian control. They were able to win over only Alfred Rosenberg to some extent. Although Hitler's staff repeatedly refused to even consider the idea, Vlasov and his allies reasoned that Hitler would eventually come to realize the futility of a war against the USSR without winning over the Russian people, and respond to Vlasov's demands.

== Ideology and program ==
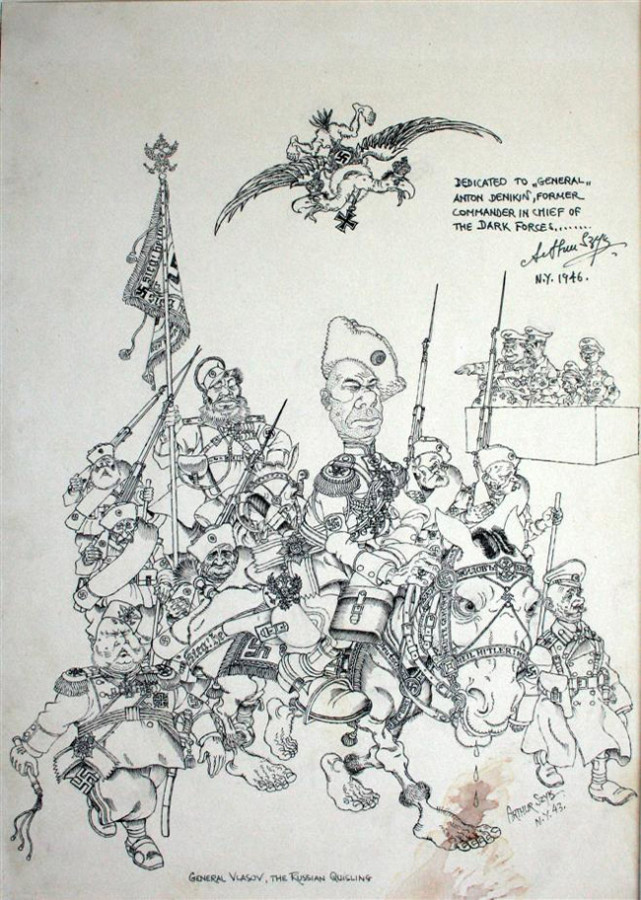
Caricature "General Vlasov, the Russian Quisling" (1943) by Arthur Szyk depicts Vlasov as a far-right reactionary surrounded by the White Guards

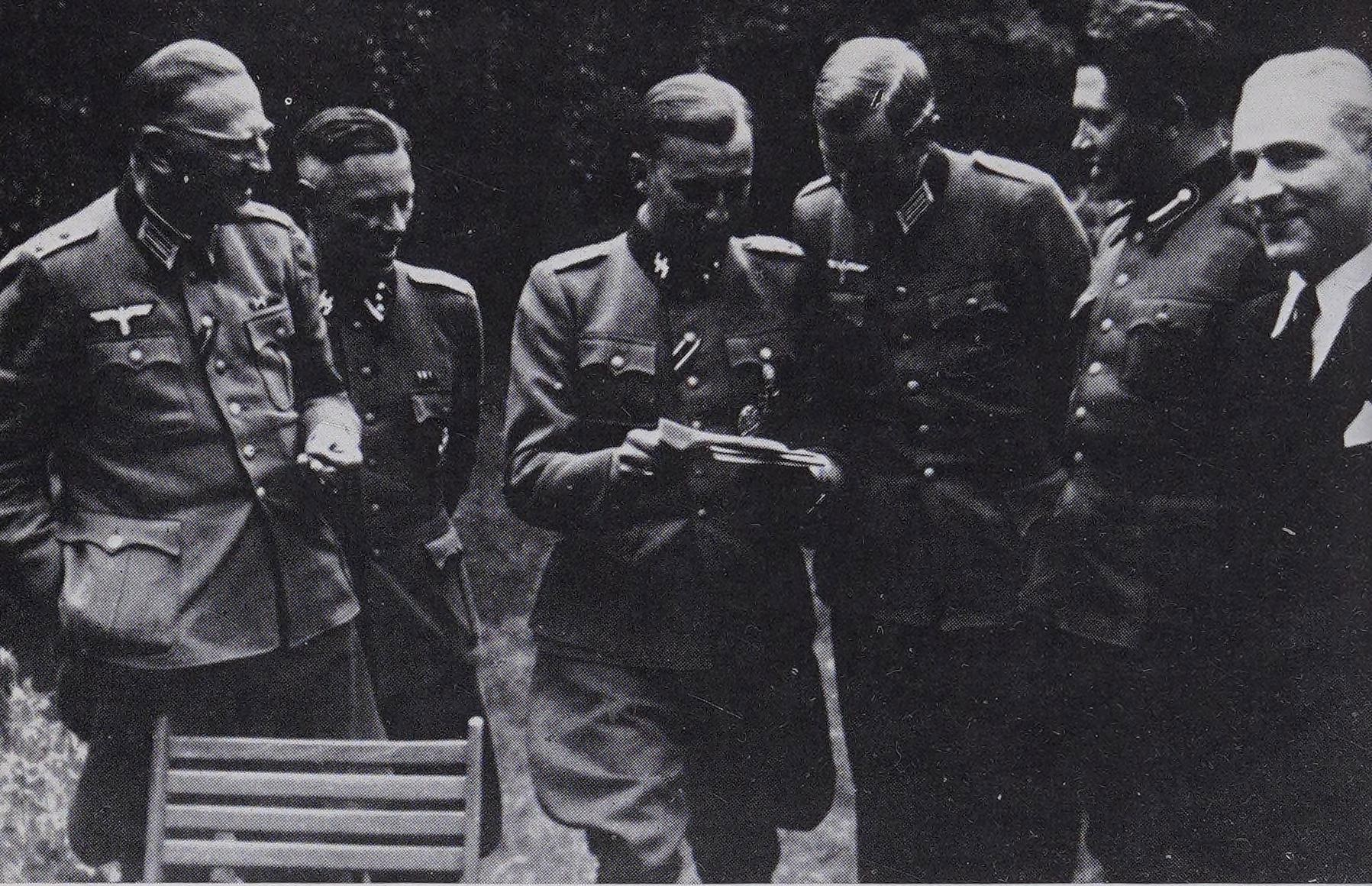
Left to right: Wilfried Strik-Strikfeldt, a major contributor to the Vlasov movement; unidentified SS officer; SS propagandist Gunter d'Alquen; Captain von Dellingshausen; Milety Zykov, the leading ideologue of the ROA; General Georgi Zhilenkov

The Vlasov movement underpinning the Russian Liberation Army had a rather undefined ideology beyond Russian nationalism and its hatred for the USSR - it was split between National Alliance of Russian Solidarists (NTS), as its ideologues surrounded Vlasov with the support of the Nazis, and the other POWs which held to social democratic views. The program documents of the Vlasov movement were written as a compromise with Nazism to various extents: the Smolensk declaration included pro-Nazi points ("Germany was not fighting the war against the Russian people and their homeland but merely against Bolshevism"), and the Prague Manifesto included a number of criticisms of the Western Allies as a compromise with Himmler's insistence to add antisemitic points. The democratic veneer seen in the declarations of ROA was only made in attempt to make the movement palatable to the Western powers.

The Nazis were suspicious of Vlasov, his organisation and his ideological position, and the Gestapo warned about the possibility of the Vlasovites betraying the Reich. The suspicions and criticism of the Vlasovites from the Reich officials was summarised in a document by the Ministry of Propaganda official Eberhard Taubert who described his concerns about the movement being "not National Socialist": "It is significant that it does not fight Jewry, that the Jewish Question is not recognized as such at all"; instead it presented "a watered-down infusion of liberal and Bolshevik ideologies", and Taubert described the concern with "strong Anglophile sympathies" and it "toying with the idea of a possible change of course" while not "feel[ing] bound to Germany".

== Formation ==
The ROA did not officially exist until autumn of 1944, after Heinrich Himmler persuaded a very reluctant Hitler to permit the formation of 10 Russian Liberation Army divisions.

With three incomplete divisions, the Army counted about 50,000 to 60,000 troops. By February 1945, only one division, the 1st Infantry (600th Infantry), was fully organised, under the command of General Sergei Bunyachenko. Formed at Münsingen, it fought briefly on the Oder Front before switching sides and participating in the Prague uprising on the Czech side.

A second division, the 2nd Infantry (650th Infantry), was incomplete when it left Lager Heuberg but was sent into action under the command of General Mikhail Meandrov. This division was joined in large numbers by eastern workers, which caused it to nearly double in size as it marched south. A third, the 3rd Infantry (700th German Infantry), had only begun formation.

On 28 January 1945, it was officially declared that the Russian divisions no longer formed part of the German Army, but would be directly under the command of KONR. A small group of ROA troops fought against the Red Army on 9 February 1945. Their fighting spirit earned them the praise of Heinrich Himmler. The only active combat the Russian Liberation Army undertook against the Red Army was by the Oder River on 11 April 1945 (Operation April Weather), largely at the insistence of Himmler, as a test of the army's reliability. After three days, the outnumbered 1st Division had to retreat.

Several other Russian-manned units, such as the Russian Corps, XV SS Cossack Cavalry Corps of General Helmuth von Pannwitz, the Kazachi Stan militia of Ataman Timofey Domanov, and other primarily White émigré formations, had agreed to become a part of Vlasov's army. However, their membership remained de jure as the turn of events did not permit Vlasov to use the troops in any operation (even reliable communications were often impossible).

== Prague uprising ==
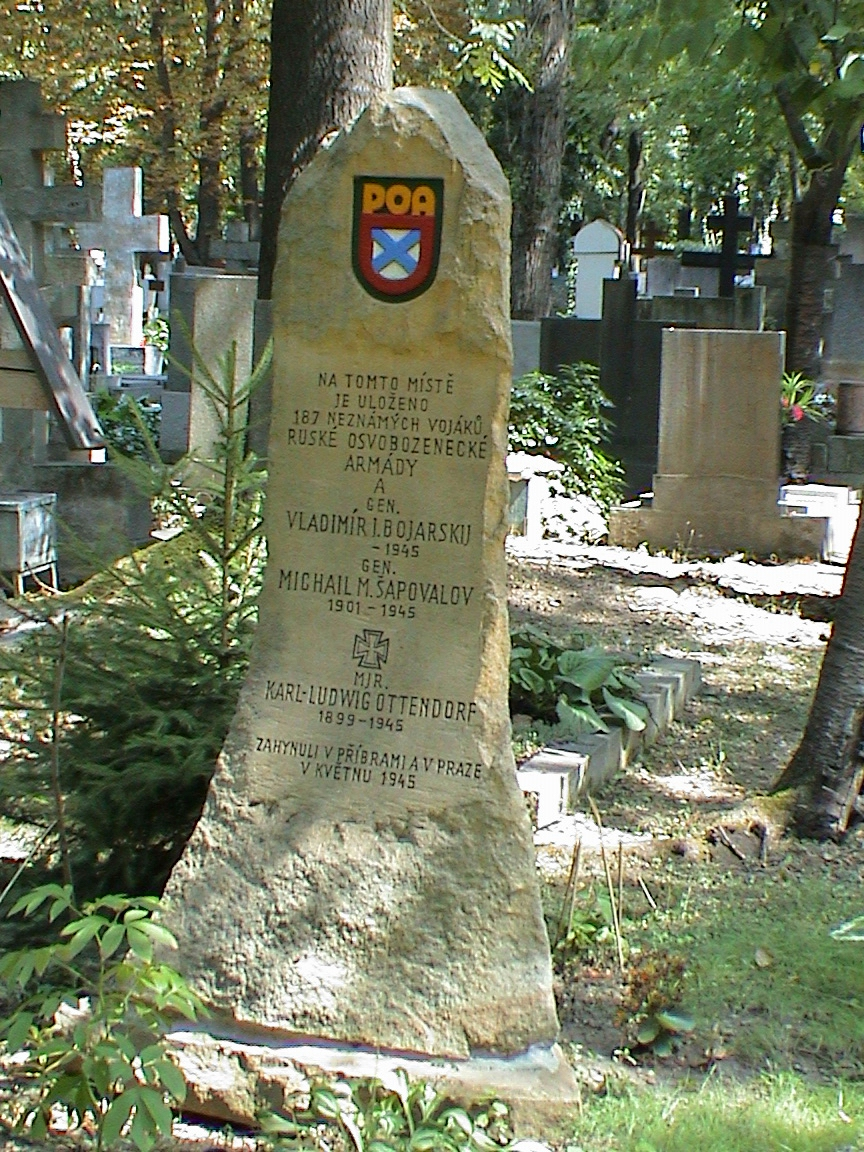
Mass grave of two generals and 187 unknown ROA soldiers, Olšany Cemetery in Prague, Czech Republic

During its march south, the ROA's 600th Infantry Division under the command of General Sergei Bunyachenko's came to the help of the Czech partisans in the Prague uprising. The uprising against the German occupation started on May 5, 1945. Hoping that the ROA could be persuaded to switch sides in order to avoid accusations of collaboration with Nazi Germany, the Czech military command sent an envoy to Bunyachenko, who agreed to switch sides to help the Czech resistance. Vlasov was initially reluctant to agree to that move, but ultimately did not resist Bunyachenko's decision to fight against the Germans. As the ROA soldiers were wearing German uniforms, the troops were given Russian white-blue-red flags to distinguish themselves.

The division engaged in battle with Waffen-SS units that had been sent to level the city. The ROA units, armed with heavy weaponry, fended off the relentless SS assault, and together with the Czech insurgents succeeded in preserving most of Prague from destruction.

== Surrender and repatriation ==
Due to the predominance of communists in the new Czech Rada ("council"), the division had to leave the city the very next day. Vlasov ordered the 1st Division to march south to concentrate all Russian anti-communist forces loyal to him. As an army, he reasoned, they could all surrender to the Western Allies on "favorable" terms, which particularly meant no repatriation to the Soviet Union. Vlasov sent several secret delegations to the Western Allies to begin negotiating a surrender, hoping they would sympathise with the goals of ROA and potentially use it in an inevitable future war with the USSR.

The Western Allies, however, were obligated by the terms of the Yalta Conference to repatriate all Soviet citizens. The majority of ROA combatants who surrendered were forcefully repatriated to the Soviet Union, either after surrendering to the Red Army or later, upon being handed over to the Soviet Union by the Allies. Vlasov surrendered on 12 May 1945; 9,000 of his troops were disarmed nearby. The only ROA unit that largely avoided repatriation was the ROA air arm commanded by Viktor Maltsev. ROA's high-ranking officers including Mikhail Meandrov, Andrey Sevastyanov and Vladimir Artsezo were handed over in early 1946. The last forced repatriation occurred in 1947 under Operation Keelhaul.

Personnel of collaborationist units were sent to NKVD filtration camps or directly to Gulag corrective labor camps to undergo filtration. By law, military collaborators were expected to face the heaviest punishment. In practice, Soviet policies towards collaborators had shifted towards the end of the war. Rank-and-file (privates and sergeants) ROA collaborators usually received six-year terms in special settlements and avoided criminal prosecution. On the other hand, NKVD arrested and prosecuted ROA commanders and officers; they were typically sentenced to the Gulag and received harsh sentences. The leadership was tried and executed.

== Order of battle ==
The Army's order of battle included:

- Central headquarters, headquarters subunits, and officer reserve (1 200 men);
- 1st Division under the command of major general Sergey Bunyachenko (20 000 men);
- 2nd Division under the command of major general Grigory Zverev (11 856 men);
- 3rd Division under the command of major general Mikhail Shapalov (10 000 men);
- Air Force of KONR under the command of major general Viktor Maltsev (5 000–6 000 men).

By April 22, 1945, the following units were incorporated into the armed forces of KONR (although this had no practical effect as the war ended weeks later):

- Russian Protective Corps under the command of lieutenant general Boris Shteifon (6 000 men);
- XV SS Cossack Cavalry Corps (27 000 men);
- Separate Corps of major general Anton Turkul (4 000 men);
- Separate Cossack Corps of major general Timofey Domanov (Kazachi Stan, ~9 400 men)

== Ranks ==
Insignia		Rank	Translisteration	Comparative rank in the Army
Collar	Shoulder	Rank	Translisteration	Comparative rank in the Army
		Генерал	General	General der Waffengattung
		Генерал-лейтенант	General-leytenant	Generalleutnant
		Генерал-майор	General-mayor	Generalmajor
		Полковник	Polkovnik	Oberst
		Подполковник	Podpolkovnik	Oberstleutnant
		Майор	Mayor	Major
		Капитан	Kapitan	Hauptmann
		Поручик	Poruchik	Oberleutnant
		Подпоручик	Podporuchik	Leutnant
		Фельдфебель	Fel'dfebel'	Feldwebel
		Унтер-офицер	Unter-ofitser	Unteroffizier
		Ефрейтор	Yefreytor	Gefreiter
		Солдат	Soldat	Soldat

== See also ==
- Russian National People's Army
- Russian People's Liberation Army
- First Russian National Army
- Collaboration in the German-occupied Soviet Union
- Cossack collaboration with Nazi Germany
- Wehrmacht foreign volunteers and conscripts
- National Committee for a Free Germany

== Sources ==
- Elizabeth M.F. Grasmeder, "Leaning on Legionnaires: Why Modern States Recruit Foreign Soldiers," International Security (July 2021), Vol 46 (No. 1), pp. 147–195.
- Julicher, Peter (2015). "Enemies of the People" Under the Soviets: A History of Repression and Its Consequences. McFarland. ISBN 9780786496716.
- MacDonald, Callum; Kaplan, Jan (1995). Prague in the shadow of the swastika: a history of the German occupation 1939–1945. Melantrich. ISBN 9788070232118.
- Mueggenberg, Brent (2019). The Cossack Struggle Against Communism, 1917–1945. Jefferson: McFarland & Company. ISBN 9781476679488.
- Polian, Pavel (2002). Жертвы двух диктатур: Жизнь, труд, унижение и смерть советских военнопленных и остарбайтеров на чужбине и на родине [Victims of Two Dictatorships: The Life, Work, Humiliation, and Death of Soviet Prisoners of War and Ostarbeiter in Foreign Lands and in the Motherland] (in Russian) (2-е изд. ed.). Мoscow: РОССПЭН. p. 896. ISBN 5-8243-0130-1.
- Zemskov, Viktor (2011). "К вопросу о судьбе советских репатриантов в СССР (1944-1955)" [The Fate of Soviet Repatriates in the USSR (1944-1955)]. Политическое просвещение (Politpros.com) (in Russian).
