= Collaboration in the German-occupied Soviet Union =

Aspect of World War II history

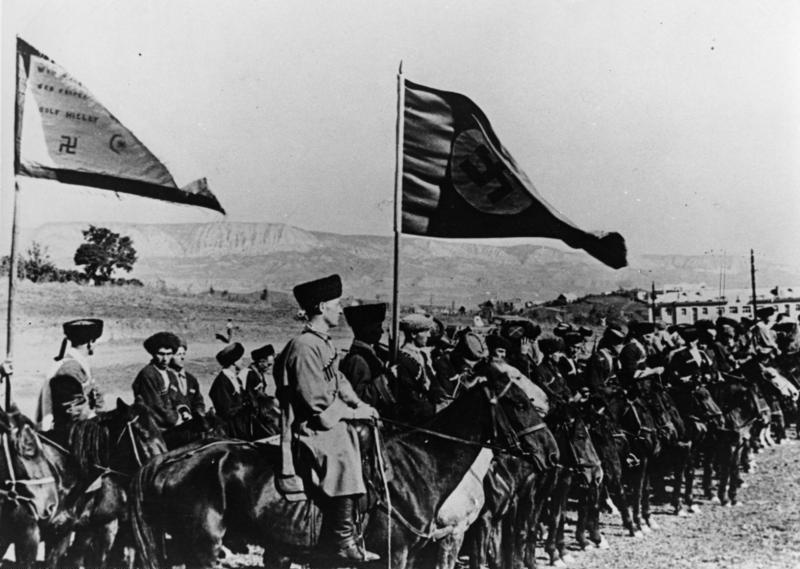
Cossacks in the Wehrmacht under the Swastika flag, 1942, southwestern Russia

A large number of Soviet citizens of various ethnicities collaborated with Nazi Germany during World War II. It is estimated that the number of Soviet collaborators with the Nazi German military was around 1 million.

== Aftermath of the German invasion ==
The St. Andrew's Flag, used by Russian Liberation Army and the Committee for the Liberation of the Peoples of Russia

Mass collaboration ensued after the German invasion of the Soviet Union of 1941, Operation Barbarossa. The two main forms of mass collaboration in the Nazi-occupied territories were both military in nature. It is estimated that anywhere between 600,000 and 1,400,000 Soviets were “military collaborators” with the Wehrmacht in some way either as Hiwis (or Hilfswillige) or in some other capacity, including 275,000 to 350,000 "Muslim and Caucasian”. Ahead of the subsequent implementation of the more oppressive administrative methods by the SS. As much as 20% of the German manpower (when including Hiwis) in Soviet Russia was composed of former Soviet citizens, about half of whom were ethnic Russians. The Ukrainian collaborationist forces comprised an estimated 180,000 volunteers serving with units scattered all over Europe. The second type of mass collaboration was the formation of indigenous security formations (majority ethnic Russian) running into hundreds of thousands and possibly more than 1 million (250,000 volunteers in the East Legions alone). Military collaboration – wrote Alex Alexiev – took place in truly unprecedented numbers suggesting that, more often than not, the Germans were perceived at first as the lesser of two evils compared to the USSR by the non-Russian citizens of the Soviet Union.

In the autumn of 1941, Field Marshal von Bock had sent to Hitler's Headquarters a detailed project for the organization of a Liberation Army of some 200,000 Russian volunteers, and for the formation of a local government in the province of Smolensk. It was returned in November 1941 with the notation that "such thoughts cannot be discussed with the Führer," and that "politics are not the prerogatives of Army Group Commanders." Of course, Field-Marshal Keitel, who wrote this notation, did not show the project to Hitler.

== Russian collaborationism ==
=== White émigré military formations ===
- First Russian National Army (earlier Sonderdivision Russland)
- Russian National People's Army (RNNA)
- Dispersed formations in the 9th army of the Wehrmacht and private emigres
- Russian Protective Corps

=== Vlasov Movement ===
- Committee for the Liberation of the Peoples of Russia (KONR)
  - Russian Liberation Army (ROA)
- National Alliance of Russian Solidarists (NTS), actively involved in the Russian Liberation Movement, although opposed the Nazis. NTS contributed to ROA, and some of the ROA leading figures, like Fyodor Truhin, were important members of NTS.

=== RONA and Lokot Autonomy ===
Flag of RONA, Lokot Republic and National Socialist Party of Russia

The Russian Liberation People's Army (Русская освободительная национальная армия, РОНА; in Latin, RONA), later reformed as Waffen-Sturmbrigade "RONA" and nicknamed the "Kaminski Brigade" after its commander, Waffen-Brigadefuhrer Bronislav Kaminski, was a collaborationist force originally formed from a Nazi-led militia unit in the "Lokot Republic" (Lokot Autonomy), a small puppet regime set up by the Germans to see if a Russian puppet government would be reliable. Kaminski and the leader of the government and the founder of National Socialist Labor Party of Russia, Konstantin Voskoboinik, killed by partisans in 1942, formed a unit that had a strength of 10,000—15,000. As the Red Army advanced, the Kaminski troops were forced to retreat into Belarus, and then into Poland in 1944. There, the RONA was reorganized into an SS brigade, the majority of whom were Russians, with the rest comprising other Soviet ethnicities including Ukrainians, Belarusians and Azerbaijanis. In August, 1,700 brigade troops under Major Yuri Frolov were sent to Warsaw to quell an uprising. During it, the RONA troops became infamous for their atrocities, committing murder, rape, and theft. Some were reported to have left the combat zone with carts full of stolen goods. About 400 soldiers were lost in combat, including Frolov.

At the end of August, Bronislav Kaminski was killed. His death was surrounded with mystery as, while official records state that he was killed by Polish partisans, it is believed that Kaminski was executed by the SS. The reasons are thought to be his unit's war crimes and/or now that Heinrich Himmler supported the Russian Liberation Army of General Andrey Vlasov, he wanted to eliminate a potential rival. The rest of the brigade was reformed into the 29th Waffen Grenadier Division of the SS "RONA", which was disbanded in November 1944. Its remaining 3,000–4,000 members were sent to join Vlasov's army.

=== Other ===
- Russian People's Labour Party
- GULAG Operation
- Union for the Struggle Against Bolshevism led by Mikhail Oktan

== Ukrainian collaborationism ==
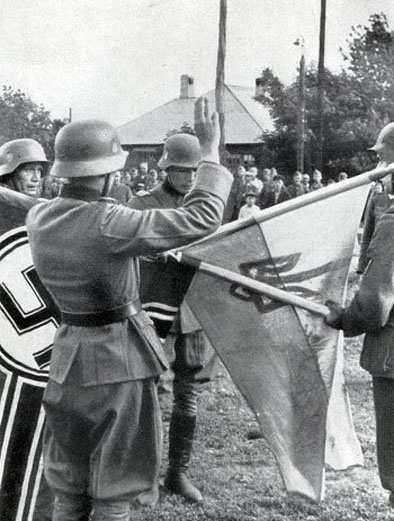
Ukrainian Liberation Army oath to Adolf Hitler

=== Political formations ===
- Ukrainian National Government (OUN-B), but after an attempt to restore the Ukrainian State with the Act of restoration of the Ukrainian state on 30th June 1941 many OUN-B leaders were sent to concentration camps and those who remained at large declared war on Nazi Germany.
- Ukrainian National Council (headed by Mykola Velychkivsky; OUN-M)
- Ukrainian Central Committee (headed by Volodymyr Kubijovyč)
- Ukrainian National Committee (1945)

=== Ukrainian police and military formations ===
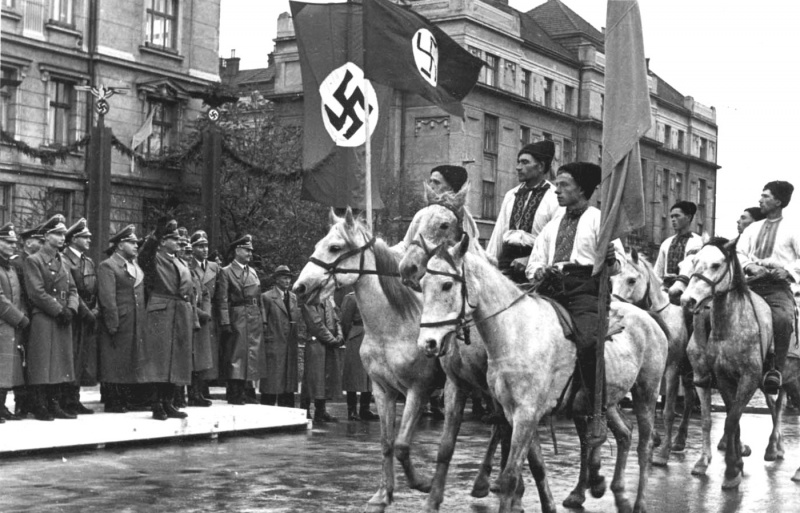
German-Ukrainian parade in Stanislaviv, 1941

- 14th Waffen Grenadier Division of the SS (1st Galician)
- Nachtigall Battalion
- Roland Battalion
- Ukrainian Auxiliary Police
- Ukrainian Legion of Self-Defense
- Ukrainian Liberation Army
- Ukrainian National Army, headed by Ukrainian National Committee
- Ukrainian People's Militsiya

== Belarusian collaborationism ==
- Belarusian National Socialist Party
- Belarusian Independence Party
- Zuyev Republic

=== Generalbezirk Weißruthenien ===
- Belarusian Auxiliary Police
- Belarusian Central Council
  - Belarusian Home Defence
  - Union of Belarusian Youth
- Belarus Newspaper

== Cossacks ==
Cossack collaboration with Nazi Germany began as a pragmatic, decentralized effort by frontline Wehrmacht commanders in the summer of 1941, who bypassed central racial policies to recruit anti-Soviet volunteers into ad-hoc security and scouting detachments. Following severe combat attrition at the Battle of Stalingrad, the German High Command centralized these scattered squadrons, culminating in the formation of the 1st Cossack Cavalry Division under German Major General Helmuth von Pannwitz. Due to intense political distrust regarding potential mass desertions back to regular Soviet lines, the division was intentionally withheld from frontline combat against the Red Army and deployed to the Independent State of Croatia in September 1943. There, the cavalrymen were fully absorbed into the Waffen-SS framework as the XV SS Cossack Cavalry Corps, where they conducted brutal rear-area security warfare (Bandenbekämpfung) and became known for their ruthless and undisciplined behavior.

The political and ideological consolidation of the movement was managed through centralized bureaucratic institutions established in Berlin under the Reich Ministry for the Occupied Eastern Territories. This administrative framework was fully institutionalized in March 1944 with the formation of the Main Administration of Cossack Forces (Hauptverwaltung der Kosakenheere), a formal governing body headed by prominent Tsarist general Pyotr Krasnov. To bypass Nazi racial restrictions, Krasnov and his inner circle aggressively promoted pseudo-historical theories framing Cossacks as an elite Germanic sub-race descended from the Ostrogoths, hoping to secure long-term geopolitical leverage for a sovereign "Cossackia". Operating as a subordinate department of the ministry, Krasnov's administration published propaganda periodicals, managed independent financial institutions, and maintained civic and judicial control over the Kazachi Stan, a mobile, self-contained collaborationist government managing thousands of militia members and their civilian dependents fleeing Red Army advances. Stationed first in Belarus and then in Italy, the Kazachi Stan combat units protected Wehrmacht supply routes and executed rear-area anti-partisan reprisals.

Fleeing the collapsing fronts, both the SS Corps and the Kazachi Stan launched an unauthorized alpine retreat into Carinthia, Austria, where the central leadership succumbed to profound ideological delusions regarding their post-war utility to the Western Allies. Krasnov and Field Ataman Timofey Domanov operated under the firm, erroneous belief that the Anglo-American coalition would imminently fracture and enter a preventive war against the Soviet Union, intending to offer their intact combat formations to the British as an organized anti-communist vanguard legion. Instead, British forces utilized a targeted legal ruse: an invitation to a fictitious administrative summit to discuss their refugee status—to safely decapitate the command structure before executing blanket camp clearings. Bound by Yalta Conference reciprocal repatriation mandates and eager to safeguard the ongoing return of Western prisoners of war from Soviet zones, British authorities delivered approximately 45,000 to 50,000 total Cossack personnel to the NKVD, culminating in a January 1947 closed military tribunal and the collective hanging of the senior leadership cadre in Moscow.

Cossack collaborationist units involved:

- XV SS Cossack Cavalry Corps
  - 1st Cossack Cavalry Division
  - 2nd Cossack Cavalry Division
- Kazachi Stan
  - Kosakenland
- Various Cossack auxiliary police units

== North Caucasus and Asia ==
- 162nd Turkestan Division
- Armenian Legion
- Azerbaijani Legion
- Georgian Legion
- Caucasian-Mohammedan Legion
- North Caucasian Legion
- Kalmykian Cavalry Corps
- Tatar Legions
- Turkestan Legion
- Idel Ural Legion

== See also ==
- Collaboration with Nazi Germany and Fascist Italy
- Wehrmacht foreign volunteers and conscripts
- Waffen-SS foreign volunteers and conscripts
- Reichskommissariat Moskowien, initially Reichskommissariat Russland
- Reichskommissariat Ukraine
- Reichskommissariat Ostland
- German atrocities committed against Soviet prisoners of war
