= Lokot =

Lokot may refer to:

- Lokot (inhabited locality), name of several inhabited localities in Russia
  - Lokot, Bryansk Oblast
  - Lokot, Loktevsky District, Altai Krai
- Lokot Autonomy (1941–1944), a semi-autonomous region in Nazi German-occupied Russia
- Anatoly Lokot (born 1959), mayor of Novosibirsk, Russia

== See also ==
- Lokot-lokot, a Filipino delicacy made from rice
- Lokotok
- Lukut, a suburb of Port Dickson, Negeri Sembilan, Malaysia
