= National Socialist Labor Party of Russia =

National Socialist Labor Party of Russia Национал-социалистическая рабочая партия России
- Abbreviation: NSLPR (English); НСРП (Russian)
- Founder: Bronislav Kaminski and Konstantin Voskoboinik
- Founded: 1942
- Dissolved: 1943
- Headquarters: Lokot (Lokot Autonomy)
- Armed wing: Russian People's Liberation Army
- Ideology: Nazism; Agrarianism; Russian nationalism Collaborationism; Third Position; Anti-Capitalism; Anti Bolshevism
- Political position: Far-right
- Religion: Orthodox Christianity

Party flag

National Socialist Labor Party of Russia (NSLPR) (Rus: Национал-социалистическая рабочая партия России (НСРП)) was a Russian political party created in the German occupied semi-autonomous Lokot Republic by Bronislav Kaminski, the leader of the Russian People's Liberation Army and Konstantin Voskoboinik, Starosta of the Lokot Autonomy. The Party underwent several name changes: in May 1943 it was renamed the ‘National Socialist Party of Russia’ (Natsional-sotsialisticheskaia partiia Rossii, NSPR), and in that November it became the ‘National Socialist Workers’ Party of Russia’ (Natsional-sotsialisticheskaia trudovaia partiia Rossii, NSTPR).

== Background ==
The city of Lokot and its surroundings fell to German occupation in 1941, during Operation Barbarossa, after which the Lokot Autonomy was formed. The autonomy has been described as an "experiment" done by the Nazis to gauge the effectiveness of collaboration.

== Foundation ==
Bronislav Kaminski and Konstantin Voskoboinik were the most important individuals in the Lokot Autonomy (Ober-Burgomeister and Starosta). They were very loyal collaborators, who tried to prove their loyalty many times, with:

- The creation of the People's Militia of the Lokot Autonomy
- Continuous operations against Soviet partisans

They believed in the success of the Lokot Autonomy, that led to the creation of the NSLPR. The party was under German control (Working on German territory), but had independent leadership.

== Ideology ==
One of the main views of the NSLPR was anti-semitism, with one of the founders (Bronislav Kaminski) saying: "They (Jews) transformed socialism into Marxism, communism and Bolshevism, and national imperialism into capitalist imperialism". This was one of the factors that led to the party accepting the national-socialist ideology. Another being the need to prove their loyalty to the Germans. The Russian People's Liberation Army, which was the main part of the Lokot Autonomy's army was a national-socialist army, which also connected itself with agrarianism, which strongly influenced the party. It was the best evidence of Lokot's collaboration with Germany.

== Dissolution ==
The party was de facto dissolved in 1944, after the death of Bronislav Kaminski.
