= Lokot (inhabited locality) =

Lokot (Russian: Локоть) is the name of several inhabited localities in Russia.

Urban localities

- Lokot, Bryansk Oblast, a work settlement in Brasovsky District of Bryansk Oblast

Rural localities

- Lokot, Loktevsky District, Altai Krai, a selo in Loktevsky Selsoviet of Loktevsky District of Altai Krai
