= Konstantin Voskoboinik =

Russian Axis military commander (1895–1942)

- Константин Воскобойник
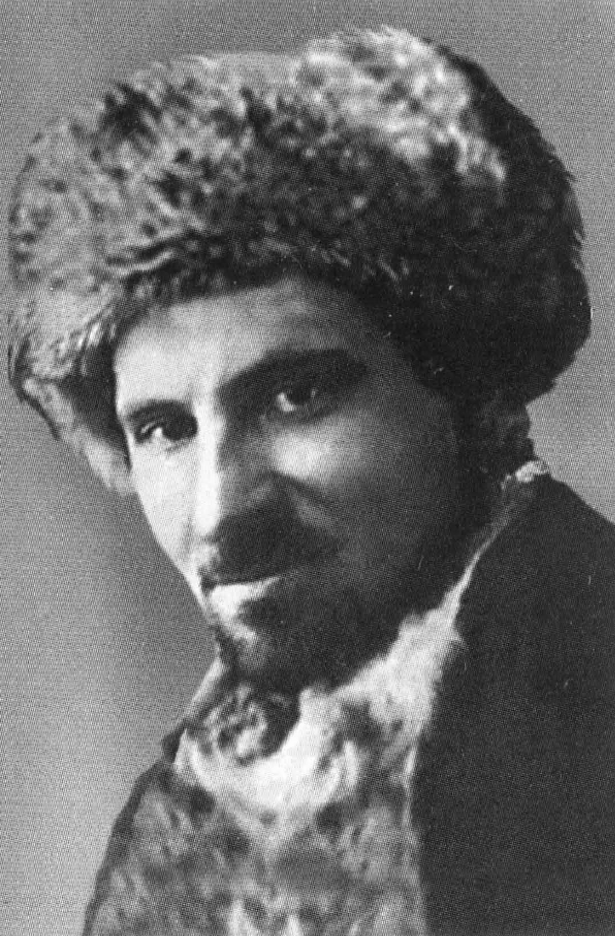

Burgomaster of the Lokot Autonomy
- In office 15 November 1941 – 8 January 1942
- Preceded by: Position established
- Succeeded by: Bronislav Kaminski

Personal details
- Born: 1895 Smela, Russian Empire (now Smila, Ukraine)
- Died: 8 January 1942 (aged 46–47) Lokot, Bryansk Oblast, Russian SFSR, Soviet Union (now Russia)
- Party: National Socialist Labor Party of Russia
- Education: Moscow State University

Military service
- Allegiance: Russian Empire; Russian SFSR; Green armies; Nazi Germany
- Years of service: 1916–1920
- Battles/wars: Russian Civil War World War II: Battle of Lokot †

Konstantin Pavlovich Voskoboinik (Russian: Константи́н Па́влович Воскобо́йник; 1895 – 8 January 1942) was a Russian Nazi collaborator politician and military commander who served as the first burgomaster of the Lokot Autonomy, a collaborationist autonomy established in German-occupied areas of Russia. He was a close friend and associate of Bronislav Kaminski, who succeeded him as leader.

Born in modern-day Ukraine, Voskoboinik fought in the Russian Civil War first as part of the Red Army, and later with the Green armies. After the failure of an uprising he took part in, Voskoboinik lived under an assumed name for a decade before confessing and being given three years of exile. He later moved to Lokot, Bryansk Oblast, where he met Kaminski. Amidst Operation Barbarossa Voskoboinik organised the Lokot Autonomy, an autonomous government under German rule. In addition, Voskoboinik was the founder and first leader of the People's Socialist Party of Russia "Viking" ("Vityaz"), later known as the National Socialist Labour Party of Russia (NSLPR).

== Early life and career ==
Konstantin Voskoboinik was born in 1895 in the town of Smela, in the Kiev Governorate of the Russian Empire (now Smila, Cherkasy Oblast, in central Ukraine) into the family of a railroad worker. In 1915 he entered the Faculty of Law of Moscow State University, in 1916 he volunteered to serve in World War I and graduated from the Warrant Office School. In 1919, amidst the Russian Civil War, he joined the Red Army, and in 1920 he was wounded and demobilised as unfit for military service. He was sent to work as a secretary of the Khvalynsky military commissariat.

In late 1920–1921, Voskoboinik defected from the Red Army and joined a peasant uprising in protest of the extortion of peasants. In 1921 he joined the Socialist Revolutionary detachments of Vakulin-Popov and fought against Red Army units in the Volga region. He was assigned as a machine gunner, and received another injury to his arm. The uprising was suppressed by the Red Army under the command of Mikhail Tukhachevsky.

After the defeat of the uprising, he hid under false documents in the name of Ivan Yakovlevich Loshakov. He fled to Astrakhan, where he remarried his wife, giving her a "new" surname. From Astrakhan the Loshakovs moved to Syzran, then to Nizhny Novgorod, until in 1924 they moved to Moscow. Here Voskoboinik graduated from the electromechanical faculty of the Plekhanov Institute of National Economy and worked as the head of electrical workshop at the All-Union Chamber of Weights and Measures.

In 1931, believing that 10 years had already passed the statute of limitations since his participation in the peasant uprising, he came to the OGPU and confessed. He was not convicted, but was administratively exiled for three years to Novosibirsk Oblast. After the end of his exile he lived with his family and worked in construction organisation in Kriviy Rih and Orsk. Beginning in 1938 Voskoboinik worked as a physics teacher at the Brasov Hydromelioration College in Lokot, Bryansk Oblast, where he met and became friends with Bronislav Kaminski. Voskoboinik settled in Lokot, most likely because he was forbidden to live in large cities. The Lokot NKVD office had an impression of him as a person "loyal to the Soviet government, an intellectual with an inflated self-esteem".

== Political activity ==
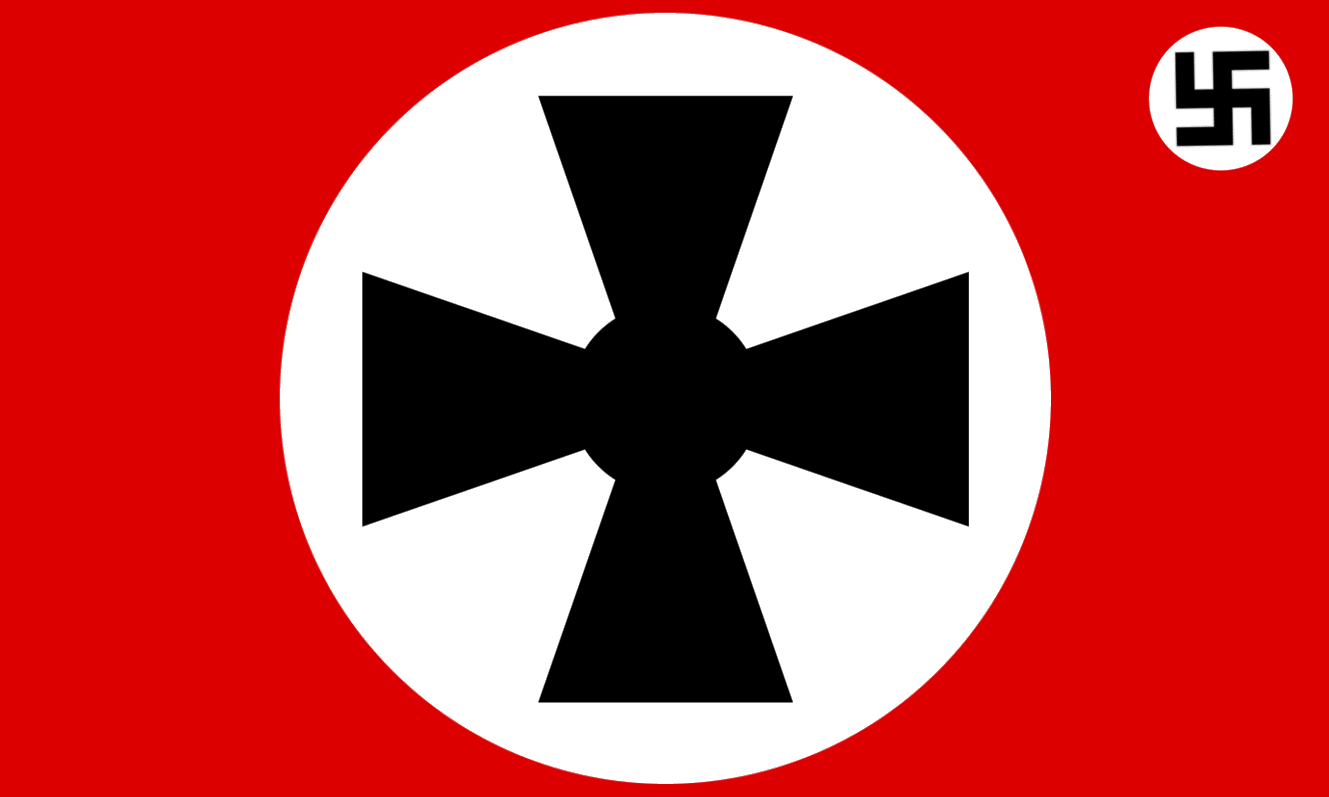
Flag of Russian National Liberation Army, the Lokot Autonomy and the People's Socialist Party of Russia

Voskoboinik founded the People's Socialist Party of Russia (PSPR) and wrote a manifesto for it under the pseudonym Engineer of the Earth (KPV). The manifesto contained twelve points, which were separated between economics and politics. The economic portion of the manifesto espoused largely socialist policies, supporting the abolition of the kolkhoz system, free transfer of all arable land to peasantry, legalisation of private enterprise with the state retaining the main means of production, and limiting the size of private capital. In terms of political policies, the party espoused Russian nationalism.

It is likely that in the combination of these two parts of the program, the leaders of the Lokot Autonomy, fascinated by German Nazism, saw nothing less than their own, Russian National Socialism.

In the interwar period, Lokot had become a stronghold for the repressed intelligentsia, thus giving ground to anti-Soviet sentiment; the creation of the party and political propaganda activities contributed to the growth of anti-communist sentiment, which led the population to support right-wing politics.

Even before the advanced units of the Wehrmacht came to Lokot, Voskoboinik created a local self-government and a small self-defense detachment in the conditions of fleeing of the local representatives of the Soviet power. After the arrival of the Germans in September–October 1941, he offered them cooperation and was appointed headman and commander of the self-defense detachment in the village of Lokot, where he recruited a detachment of 20 people who had suffered under the Soviet government, as well as from the "encircled". Taking into account Voskoboinik's organizational skills, a month later, on 16 October 1941, the German authorities significantly expanded his powers: the police detachment was increased to 200 men, Voskoboinik was subordinated to the settlements adjacent to Lokot, and the Lokot parish was formed, in which rural self-defense units were created.

During the German occupation, local residents and the German occupational forces were united purely by their shared opposition to the Soviet Union. The Lokot Autonomy's activities, although under German rule, were not inspired by German racial ideology, and, in fact, Voskoboinik's party rejected the concept of "untermenschen". However, the Lokot Autonomy police completely massacred the Jewish population of the area. There were 223 Jews shot in Suzemka, and 39 in Navlya.

== Death ==
On the night of 8 January 1942, Soviet partisans under the command of Alexander Saburov, having made a winter rush on 120 sledges, carried out an attack on the barracks of the local police and the house of the burgomaster. Despite the surprise, the police organised a response to the partisans. During the operation, Voskoboinik was killed, upon which the partisans withdrew. The total losses of the collaborators amounted to about 50 people. The casualties of Saburov's forces amount around 80 people.

German doctors, who arrived urgently from Oryol, were unable to save Voskoboinik, and he died the same day. Bronislaw Kaminski took over the duties of burgomeister and head of the PSPR.

=== Versions of Voskoboinikov's death ===
Sources differ on the circumstances of Voskoboinik's death. Two different versions have been proposed, stating that Voskoboinik:

- was fatally shot on the porch of his home;
- was fatally wounded in the theatre building ("the main group of attackers of several dozen people who broke into the theater was blocked, they were shooting back desperately, and from time to time they threw grenades through the broken doors and windows, they had nowhere to go — they were blocked, and they were doomed. They could have easily been pelted with grenades. But the entire theater building would have burned to the ground. That is why Voskoboinik forbade his men to use grenades. He suggested that those surrounded in the theater stop the useless bloodshed and surrender. He promised to leave everyone alive on his personal word of honor — the word of the commander. In response, Voskoboinik was asked to come out to a lighted place to make sure that it was really him, "Governor of Lokot." And when Voskoboinik came out, he was immediately killed by a long line of "Degtyar").

== Legacy ==
On 6 June 2005, Voskoboinik and Kaminski were canonised by the Catacomb Church group Russian Catacomb Church of True Orthodox Christians.

== Bibliography ==
=== In Russian ===
- Ермолов И.Г. История Локотского округа и Русской Освободительной Народной Армии — Орёл, 2008. — 168 p., ISBN 978-5-9708-0130-7
- Ермолов И.Г. Русское государство в немецком тылу. История Локотского самоуправления 1941–1943, Москва, ЗАО Центрполиграф, 2009. — 252 p., ISBN 978-5-9524-4487-4
