= Church of the Goths =

Church of the Goths may refer to:

- Gothic Christianity, the distinct Arian church of the early Goths
- Metropolitanate of Gothia, the church of the Crimean Goths
- Archdiocese of the Goths and the Northlands, a modern Swedish church claiming the Crimean Gothic heritage
