= Russian People's Liberation Army =

Nazi collaborationist unit in Axis-occupied Russia

Russian Liberation People's Army
- Русская освободительная народная армия
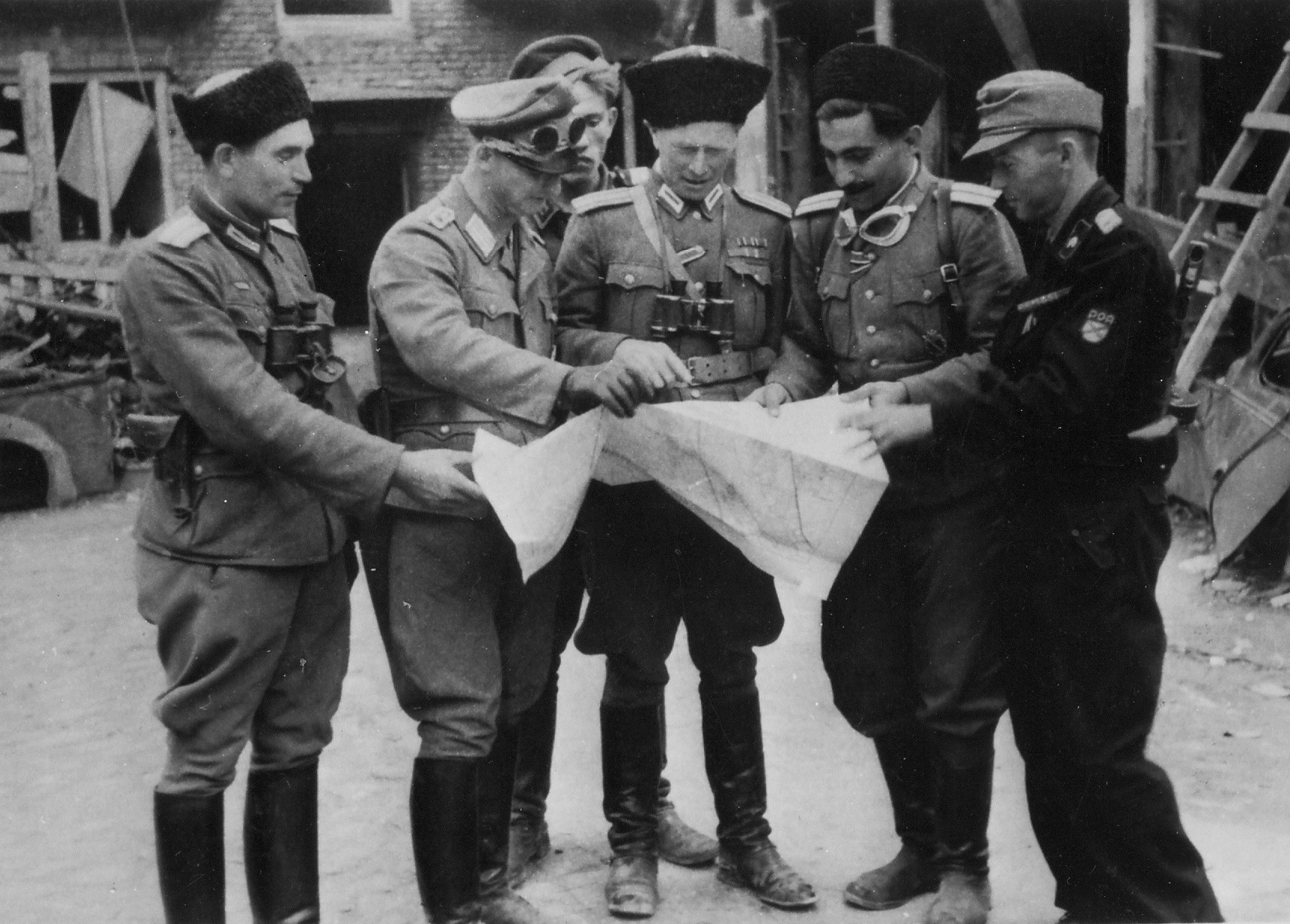
- Brigade's commanding officers during the suppression of the Warsaw Uprising, August 1944
- Other name: Waffen-Sturm-Brigade RONA (1944)
- Leader: Bronislav Kaminski
- Dates active: November 1941 – October 1944 / 1951
- Allegiance: Nazi Germany: Lokot Autonomy
- Ideology: Nazism; Agrarianism; Russian nationalism Collaborationism
- Political position: Far-right
- Size: Brigade
- Wars: Eastern Front; German anti-partisan operations (1941—43); Battle of Lokot (1942); Operation Vogelsang (1942); Operation Zigeunerbaron (1943); Operation Hornung (1943); Sevskaya Operation (1943); Battle of Kursk (1943); Operation Bagration (1944); Warsaw Uprising (1944); Ochota massacre; Defense of Pociecha; Raid on Truskaw; Slovak National uprising (1944); Anti-communist insurgencies in Central and Eastern Europe; RONA Insurgency (1944—51)

The Russian Liberation People's Army (Russian: Русская освободительная народная армия, РОНА; transcription: Russkaya osvoboditel'naya narodnaya armiya, RONA), also known as the Kaminski Brigade or the Waffen-Sturm-Brigade RONA, was a collaborationist military formation composed of Russian nationals from the territory of the Lokot Autonomy in the German-occupied regions of the Soviet Union. The unit became known for its poor discipline, frequent drunkenness, and extreme brutality, which reportedly shocked even experienced members of the SS.

The formation originated in late 1941 as an auxiliary police militia numbering around 200 men. By mid-1943, it had expanded to 10,000–12,000 personnel, equipped with captured Soviet tanks and artillery, and was commanded by Bronislav Kaminski. In 1942, Kaminski implemented forced mobilization of local residents, turning the militia into a small regular army of the Lokot Autonomy, also referred to as the "Lokot Republic". The force effectively became Kaminski's personal army, subordinate to him alone.

Following the German defeat at the Battle of Kursk in August 1943, RONA units retreated to the territory of Byelorussia, particularly to the Lyepyel area of Vitebsk, where they took part in anti-partisan operations conducted by German forces. During these operations, the unit committed numerous atrocities against the civilian population.

The unit was incorporated into the Waffen-SS in June 1944. After Operation Bagration (June–August 1944), the RONA withdrew further west, and by the end of July 1944, the remnants of the Kaminski formation—estimated at between 3,000 and 7,000 men—had regrouped at the SS training camp in Neuhammer (now Świętoszów). Based on this force, the SS leadership planned to establish the 29th Waffen Grenadier Division of the SS RONA (1st Russian) (29. Waffen-Grenadier-Division der SS "RONA" (russische Nr. 1)). Heinrich Himmler signed the order for the division's creation on 1 August 1944, the same day the Warsaw Uprising began. The formation of the division was never completed, and part of the brigade was deployed to Warsaw, where its members again committed numerous atrocities. Kaminski was later executed on Himmler's orders.

By 27 August 1944, due to the brigade's lack of discipline and unreliability, German command withdrew it from Warsaw. The unit was subsequently sent to the Slovak Republic, where it was deployed against Slovak partisans. After October 1944, the brigade was disbanded, and its remaining personnel were absorbed into Andrey Vlasov's Russian Liberation Army.

After the war, some former members of the brigade and supporters of the Lokot Autonomy organized a partisan movement, which gradually degenerated into criminal groups and was eventually suppressed in 1951.

== History ==
=== In Russia ===
In October 1941, the military advance of Nazi Germany into the Soviet Union reached the Lokot area near the city of Bryansk, capturing it on 6 October 1941. In November 1941, an engineer at the local alcohol plant, Bronislav Kaminski, and a local technical school teacher, Konstantin Voskoboinik, approached the German military administration with a proposal to assist in establishing a civil administration and local police.

Before the beginning of the war on the Eastern Front, the Lokot area had been designated as a settlement zone for people prohibited from returning to their former homes in major Soviet cities—Kaminski himself being one of them. Voskoboinik was appointed by the Germans as starosta of the "Lokot volost" and as head of the local militia unit.

The militia under Voskoboinik initially consisted of about 200 men and assisted the German authorities in various operations, including the persecution and killing of civilians accused of loyalty to the Soviet government or suspected of being Soviet partisans. By January 1942, the militia's strength had increased to between 400 and 500 men.

During a raid led by Soviet partisan commander Alexander Saburov on 8 January 1942, Voskoboinik was mortally wounded. Following his death, Kaminski assumed command and expanded the militia.

In cooperation with German forces, the militia began participating in anti-partisan operations. By the spring of 1942, its strength had risen to approximately 1,400 armed personnel. The number of Soviet partisans operating in the region was estimated at up to 20,000, and they controlled much of the rear area of Army Group Centre's operations.

In mid-March 1942, Kaminski's representative informed the German Second Panzer Army headquarters at Orel that Kaminski's unit was "ready to actively fight the guerrillas" and conduct propaganda against "Jew-Bolshevism" and Soviet partisans. Subsequently, the commander of the 2nd Army, Generaloberst Rudolf Schmidt, appointed Kaminski as mayor of the Army Rear Area 532, headquartered in Lokot. On 19 July 1942, following approval by Field Marshal Günther von Kluge, commander of Army Group Centre, Schmidt and the 532nd Area commander, Kaminski was granted a degree of autonomy and nominal self-governing authority under the supervision of Major von Veltheim and Colonel Rübsam. Kaminski became the chief mayor of the Autonomous Administration of Lokot (which included eight raions) and commander of the local militia brigade.

Emblem of the 29th SS Division RONA (stylized Cross of St. George)

Beginning in June 1942, Kaminski's militia participated in a major operation codenamed Operation Vogelsang as part of Generalleutnant Werner Freiherr von und zu Gilsa's Kampfgruppe (task force) Gilsa II. This formation included one Panzer regiment from the 5th Panzer Division, elements of the 216th Infantry Division, Kaminski's militia, and detachments from the Hungarian 102nd and 108th Light Divisions. The militia served as guides, scouts, and interpreters, remaining with Kampfgruppe Gilsa II until its disbandment in October 1942.

The official results of this operation—the first major engagement involving Kaminski's troops—reported 1,193 alleged partisans killed, 1,400 wounded, 498 captured, and 12,531 civilians "evacuated". The Kampfgruppe suffered 58 killed and 130 wounded out of a total strength of more than 6,500 personnel.

=== Russian People's Liberation Army ===
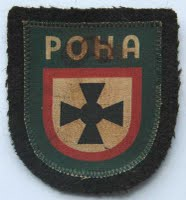
The RONA insignia

Kaminski decided to give his militia an official title, naming it the Russian People's Liberation Army (Russkaya Osvoboditelnaya Narodnaya Armiya, RONA). In autumn 1942, he ordered the compulsory conscription of all able-bodied men into the militia. The units were further reinforced with "volunteers" recruited from among Soviet prisoners of war in nearby Nazi concentration camps. From 1941 onward, due to fuel shortages and minor mechanical issues, Kaminski's unit was instructed to collect abandoned Soviet tanks and armoured vehicles. By November 1942, the formation possessed at least two BT-7 light tanks and one 76 mm artillery system.

Due to the shortage of military uniforms and footwear—some members were reportedly barefoot—the Germans supplied used uniforms, sufficient for only four battalions. By late 1942, the militia of the Lokot Autonomy had expanded to a 14-battalion brigade, comprising nearly 8,000 armed men. From 19 November to December 1942, Lokot was inspected under orders from Alfred Rosenberg. As of January 1943, the brigade numbered 9,828 men; its armoured unit included one heavy KV-2, two medium T-34, three BT-7, and two BT-5 light tanks, along with three armoured cars (one BA-10 and two BA-20).

In spring 1943, the brigade was reorganised into five regiments, each consisting of three battalions, along with an anti-aircraft battalion equipped with three anti-aircraft guns and four heavy machine guns, and an armoured unit. A separate "guard" battalion was also formed. The total brigade strength was estimated at up to 12,000 men.

Prior to Operation Citadel, the major German offensive aimed at destroying the Kursk salient, the brigade participated in Operation Zigeunerbaron ("Gypsy Baron") in May–June 1943, alongside other German units. This was followed by similar operations—Freischütz and Tannhäuser—targeting partisans and involving reprisals against the civilian population.

During the summer of 1943, the brigade experienced mass desertions, partly due to recent Soviet victories and partisan efforts to persuade Kaminski's troops to defect. Several assassination attempts were made on Kaminski's life; each time, he narrowly survived and ordered the execution of those involved. German officers passing through Lokot reported seeing bodies hanging from gallows outside Kaminski's headquarters. To prevent a collapse in discipline, a German liaison staff was assigned to Kaminski's headquarters to reorganise the brigade and restore order. At this stage, the unit's strength was estimated at around 8,500 men. Its armoured component included one heavy KV-2, four medium T-34s, three BT-5 light tanks, one T-37 amphibious tank, one BA-10 armoured car, and two armoured carriers.

Following the failure of Operation Citadel, Soviet counter-offensives forced the brigade and their families to retreat alongside the withdrawing German forces. On 29 July 1943, Kaminski issued orders for the evacuation of property and the families of RONA members and Lokot officials. By the end of August 1943, up to 30,000 people—including 10,000–11,000 brigade members—had been relocated by the Germans to the Lyepyel area of Vitebsk in Belarus. According to post-war Soviet estimates, up to 10,000 civilians were killed during the existence of the Kaminski formation.

=== In Belarus ===
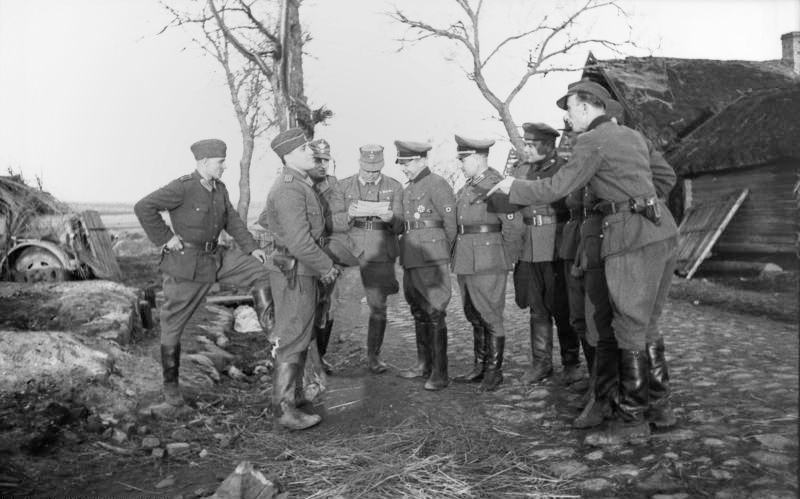
B. V. Kaminski, RONA headquarters officers, and German police officers. Photograph taken on 21 March 1944 by G. Wehmeyer, a serviceman of the 697th Wehrmacht Propaganda Company (3rd Tank Army)

The brigade eventually settled in the Lyepyel area of Vitebsk, a region heavily dominated by partisans. The unit was engaged in continuous combat in this area for the remainder of the year.

During the retreat, desertions from the brigade increased significantly, bringing the formation to the brink of collapse. When the commander of the 2nd Regiment, Major Tarasov, decided to defect to the partisans with his entire regiment—having been promised amnesty in return—Kaminski reportedly flew to Tarasov's headquarters and, according to one account, strangled him and eight others in front of their men. Despite the threat of reprisals, up to 200 soldiers deserted within the following two days. By early October 1943, the brigade had lost two-thirds of its personnel, although it retained 12 tanks (eight of them T-34s), one 122 mm gun, three 76 mm guns, and eight 45 mm artillery pieces.

On 27 January 1944, Heinrich Himmler awarded Kaminski the Iron Cross 2nd Class and, on the same day, the Iron Cross 1st Class, in recognition of his "achievements." On 15 February 1944, Kaminski issued an order to relocate the brigade and its administration further west to the Dzyatlava area in western Belarus.

=== Volksheer-Brigade ===
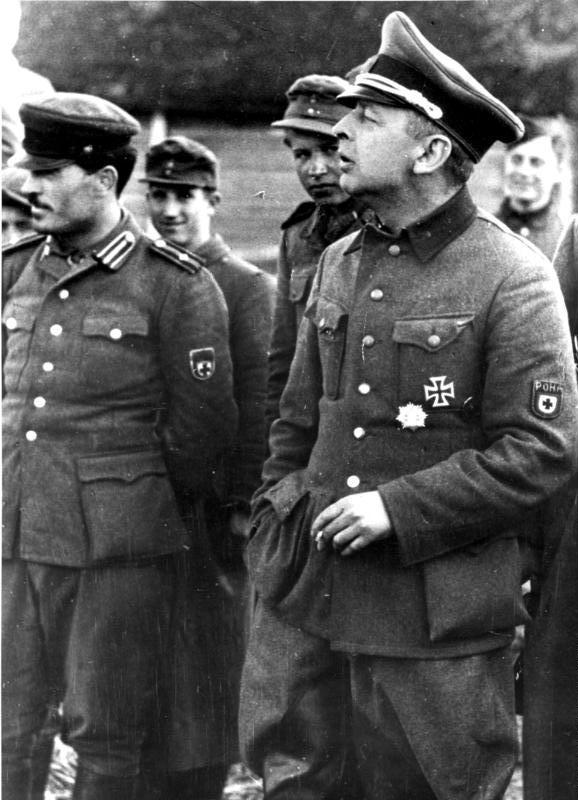
Bronislav Kaminski and personnel of the Volksheer-Brigade Kaminski during Operation Frühlingsfest, Belarus, May 1944

At this stage, the brigade's ranks were reinforced with police units from Belarus. In March 1944, the formation was renamed the Volksheer-Brigade Kaminski. Beginning on 11 April 1944, it was attached to SS-Kampfgruppe von Gottberg, which also included the SS-Sonderbataillon Dirlewanger. The unit participated in a series of large-scale anti-partisan operations, including Regenschauer (reporting up to 7,000 partisans killed), Frühlingsfest (7,011 partisans reported killed and 1,065 weapons captured), and Kormoran (7,697 partisans reported killed and 325 weapons captured).

During these operations, local civilians were often executed as "suspected partisans" or deported for forced labour, and numerous villages were destroyed.

=== Waffen-Sturm-Brigade ===
In June 1944, the brigade was incorporated into the Waffen-SS. Upon its transfer, it was redesignated as the Waffen-Sturm-Brigade RONA, and Bronislav Kaminski was granted the rank of Waffen-Brigadeführer der SS—the only individual to hold this title.

Following the launch of Operation Bagration, the brigade's anti-partisan operations were suspended. Its remaining personnel, estimated between 3,000 and 7,000 depending on the source, were regrouped at the Neuhammer SS training camp. Plans were subsequently made to create a non-German SS division, with the structure for the 29. Waffen-Grenadier-Division der SS (russische Nr. 1) established by an order issued on 1 August 1944. On the same day, Kaminski was officially promoted to Waffen-Brigadeführer und Generalmajor der Waffen-SS.

=== In Warsaw ===
The Warsaw Uprising, which began on 1 August 1944, disrupted Heinrich Himmler's plans for the RONA formation. On 4 August 1944, a combat-ready regiment of the brigade was ordered to assist German forces in suppressing the uprising. SS-Gruppenführer Heinz Reinefarth was placed in command of Kampfgruppe Reinefarth, a pacification unit that included the Kaminski Brigade, the SS-Sonderregiment Dirlewanger, and several Ordnungspolizei and SS rear-area units. Himmler personally requested Kaminski's participation, and Kaminski responded by assembling a task force of approximately 1,700 unmarried men, reportedly supported by four T-34 tanks, one SU-76, and several artillery pieces. The unit, commanded in the field by Kaminski's chief of staff, Waffen-Sturmbannführer Ivan Frolov, may have numbered around 1,600 men with seven artillery pieces and four mortars, according to Frolov's later testimony.

The Kaminski volunteers were first tasked with clearing the Ochota district, defended by about 300 poorly armed Polish insurgents. The attack was scheduled for the morning of 5 August but was delayed when Kaminski's men were found looting abandoned houses instead of assembling for combat. The offensive eventually began near noon but advanced only about 275 metres before nightfall. The brigade had neither experience nor training in urban warfare, and many soldiers were encountering a major city for the first time. They performed poorly and suffered heavy casualties. During these operations, thousands of Polish civilians were murdered by RONA troops in what became known as the Ochota massacre; many victims were also subjected to rape.

By mid-August, the Kaminski Brigade was transferred to the Wola district, where it again failed to achieve success. In one incident, a sub-unit paused to loot a building on the front line and was subsequently cut off and destroyed by Polish forces.

By 27 August, German commanders deemed the brigade too undisciplined and unreliable for further combat. Despite nearly a month of fighting, it had failed to achieve any major objectives. The German commander in Warsaw, SS-Obergruppenführer Erich von dem Bach-Zelewski, later testified that the unit "had no military combat value whatsoever, with both officers and soldiers lacking even a basic tactical understanding. I saw Kaminski's men removing cartloads of stolen jewellery, gold watches, and precious stones. The capture of a liquor supply was more important to the brigade than seizing a position on the same street. Each assault was instantly halted, as the units dispersed into looting mobs." Kaminski himself participated in the looting, claiming he was collecting valuables for his "Russian Liberation Fund." Major General Günter Rohr, commander of Warsaw's southern sector, demanded the brigade's removal, and Bach-Zelewski agreed, stating that the unit hindered the suppression of the uprising. Once replacement units arrived, the Kaminski formation was withdrawn, having lost about 500 men in combat.

The remnants of the RONA unit, now notorious even among SS formations, were reassigned to the Kampinos Forest to assist in encircling Warsaw. There, an artillery battery and one infantry battalion were attacked by about 80 Polish partisans under Lieutenant Colonel "Dolina" (Adolf Pilch) while stationed in the deserted village of Truskaw. Nearly 100 RONA and German SS personnel were killed during the midnight assault. The survivors—many reportedly intoxicated—fled in disorder, abandoning their weapons. The 1st Regiment lost its entire artillery battery and much of the loot taken from Warsaw. According to some Polish sources, 250 RONA troops were killed during the night of 2–3 September in the raid on Truskaw, and another 100 died in the raid on the village of Marianów the following night. The diary of a RONA soldier, Ivan Vashenko, who was killed at Truskaw, was later published in Poland in 1947.

During the Warsaw campaign, Kaminski was summoned to Łódź for a leadership conference but never arrived. Official reports blamed his death on an ambush by Polish partisans in which Kaminski and several RONA officials, including chief of staff Obersturmbannführer Ilya Shavykin, were allegedly killed. Other accounts suggest he was executed following a court-martial or shot by the Gestapo.

Kaminski's death, combined with the brigade’s poor discipline and combat record, ended plans to expand it into a full division. After his death, command of the remaining unit passed to SS-Brigadeführer und Generalmajor der Polizei Christoph Diehm.

=== In Slovakia ===
As the front line advanced once more, the remnants of the brigade, along with accompanying civilian refugees, were scheduled to be evacuated to Hungary. However, the outbreak of the Slovak National Uprising left them stranded in railway trains near Racibórz in southern Poland.

From 27 September 1944, the brigade came under the overall command of SS-Gruppenführer Heinrich Jürs. In October, following an inspection of the brigade's personnel in the Raum Kattowitz area, German authorities decided to incorporate the remaining elements of Kaminski’s brigade into General Andrey Vlasov's Russian Liberation Army.

=== Dissolution ===
From November 1944, the remaining elements of the brigade—estimated by some sources to number up to 2,000 personnel—were transferred to the military training camp at Münsingen. There, they became part of the newly formed 600. Infanterie-Division (russisch) under Andrey Vlasov's Russian Liberation Army. Former RONA members were reorganised into one of the division's regiments. Accompanying civilians were relocated to Pomerania to serve as labourers.

=== After the war ===
Following the end of the Second World War in Europe, some former RONA and Lokot personnel were repatriated by the Western Allies to the Soviet Union. In late 1946, a Soviet military court sentenced Ivan Frolov and several others to death. Some repatriated members of the brigade and supporters of the Lokot Autonomy formed partisan groups around Lokot; however, these groups gradually degenerated into criminal organisations, with the last major group being eliminated in 1951.

During the 1950s and 1960s, Soviet authorities identified and prosecuted dozens of additional former members, some of whom were also convicted and executed. The last known member of the Lokot/RONA personnel to be prosecuted was Antonina Makarova, who was responsible for at least 168, and possibly as many as 1,500, executions. Makarova was arrested in 1978, convicted of treason, sentenced to death, and executed in 1979.

== Ranks and insignia ==
The ranks used by the brigade from May 1943 to June 1944 were as follows:

Insignia		Rank	Transliteration	Comparative rank in the German Army
Collar	Shoulder	Rank	Transliteration	Comparative rank in the German Army
		Полковник	Polkovnik	Oberst
		Подполковник	Podpolkovnik	Oberstleutnant
		Майор	Mayor	Major
		Капитан	Kapitan	Hauptmann
		Старший лейтенант	Starshiy leytenant	Oberleutnant
		Лейтенант	Leytenant	Leutnant
		Фельдфебель	Fel'dfebel'	Feldwebel
		Унтер-офицер	Unter-ofitser	Unteroffizier
		Ефрейтор	Yefreytor	Gefreiter
		Рядовой	Ryadovoy	Grenadier

In 1942, personnel wore white armbands featuring a St. George's Cross. From May 1943, the brigade adopted an arm badge consisting of a white shield with red borders and a black St. George's Cross, with the yellow abbreviation "POHA" in the upper section. Some sources also report that a swastika appeared on the brigade’s banner.

== Commanders ==
No.	Portrait	Commander	Took office	Left office	Time in office
1	Konstantin Voskoboinik	Konstantin Voskoboinik (1895–1942)	16 October 1941	8 January 1942 †	84 days
2	Bronislav Kaminski	Waffen-Brigadeführer der SS; Bronislav Kaminski (1899–1944)	8 January 1942	18 August 1944	2 years, 223 days
3	Christoph Diehm	SS-Brigadeführer; Christoph Diehm (1892–1960)	20 August 1944	27 September 1944	40 days
4	Heinrich Jürs [de]	SS-Gruppenführer; Heinrich Jürs (1897–1945)	27 September 1944	October 1944	<1 month

== See also ==
- List of German divisions in World War II
- List of Waffen-SS divisions
- Ranks and insignia of the Waffen-SS
- Waffen-SS foreign volunteers and conscripts
- Dirlewanger Brigade
