= Bronislav Kaminski =

Russian Axis collaborator and military commander

Bronislav Vladislavovich Kaminski
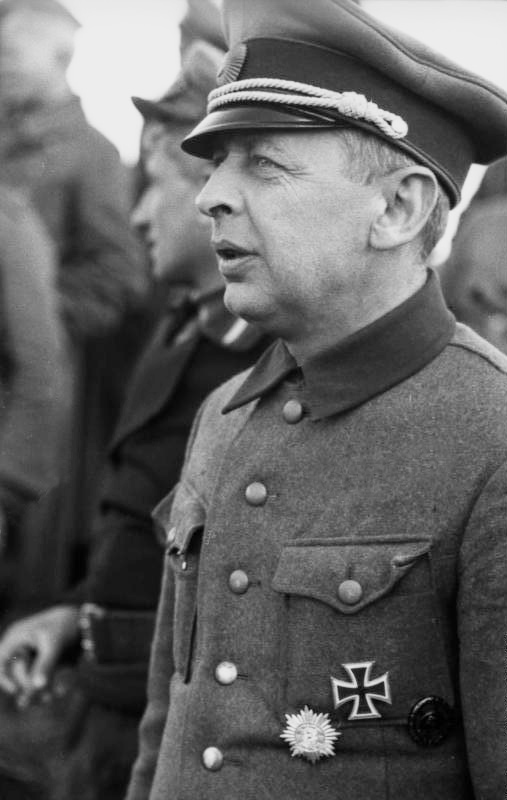
- Kaminski in 1944

Ober-Burgomeister of Lokot Autonomy
- In office 8 January 1942 – 26 August 1943
- Preceded by: Konstantin Voskoboinik
- Succeeded by: Position abolished

Personal details
- Born: 16 June 1899 Vitebsk Governorate, Russian Empire
- Died: 28 August 1944 (aged 45) Litzmannstadt, Reichsgau Wartheland, German-occupied Poland
- Cause of death: Execution by firing squad
- Awards: Iron Cross, 1st Class
- Nickname: Warlord of the Bryansk Forest

Military service
- Allegiance: Russian SFSR; Nazi Germany
- Branch/service: Red Army; Waffen-SS
- Years of service: 1918–1921 (Russia); 1941–1943 (Germany)
- Rank: SS-Brigadeführer
- Commands: Waffen-Sturm-Brigade der SS RONA
- Battles/wars: Russian Civil War; World War II; Warsaw Uprising (executed)

Bronislav Vladislavovich Kaminski (Russian: Бронисла́в Владисла́вович Ками́нский; 16 June 1899 – 28 August 1944) was a Soviet Nazi collaborator. Kaminski was the commander of the eponymous Kaminski Brigade, an anti-partisan and rear-security formation made up of people from the Lokot Autonomy (1941–1943), part of the German-occupied area of the Soviet Union. The Kaminski Brigade later became part of the Waffen-SS as the Waffen-Sturmbrigade RONA (Russkaya Osvoboditelnaya Narodnaya Armiya — Russian People's Liberation Army). Under Kaminski's command, the unit committed numerous war crimes and atrocities in the German-occupied Soviet Union and in Poland. The unit is regarded as one of the most brutal units, with Kaminski himself feared by his subordinates. Kaminski's behavior made the Germans lose confidence in him: in August 1944, he was court-martialed and executed. His brigade was later disbanded and its remaining personnel absorbed into General Andrey Vlasov's Russian Liberation Army.

== Early life ==
Bronislav (also transliterated German-style as "Bronislaw") Kaminski was born in Vitebsk Governorate, the Russian Empire, now in Polotsk District, Belarus. Some publications mistakenly give Kaminski's first name as Mieczyslaw. His father was an ethnic Pole and his mother was an ethnic German (later termed Volksdeutsch in Nazi Germany). He studied at the Saint Petersburg Polytechnical University and then served in the Red Army during the Russian Civil War. After demobilization he returned to the institute, and after graduation worked at a chemical plant. In 1935 he was expelled from the Communist Party of the Soviet Union, and in 1937 during the Great Purge he was arrested for criticising Stalin's policy of farm collectivisation, as well as working with Germans and Poles. He was accused of "belonging to a counter-revolutionary group". In 1941 he was released from prison and settled in Bryansk, where he obtained a position as an engineer in the local distillery.

== Lokot Republic leader ==
By October 1941, the German military advance into the Soviet Union reached the area of Lokot near Bryansk, which was captured by German forces on 6 October 1941. In November 1941, Kaminski, along with his close friend, a local technical school teacher, Konstantin Voskoboinik, approached the German military administration with a proposal to assist the Germans in establishing a civil administration and local police. Voskoboinik was appointed by the Germans as the Starosta (or Mayor) of the "Lokot volost" and the head of the German-controlled local militia. Kaminski became Voskoboinik's deputy; working with Heinz Guderian the two collaborators organized a militia of 10,000 armed men with the aim of crushing the Russian partisans. After the death in combat of Voskoboinik on 8 January 1942, Kaminski took over as Mayor and leader of the militia. In 1942 the militia was named Russian Liberation National Army (RONA) (rus. Русская Освободительная Народная Армия), which reached a force of tens of thousands. During this time Kaminski was leader of the Lokot Republic, which had half a million inhabitants.

In mid March 1942, Kaminski's representative at the German Second Panzer Army at Orel assured the commanders that Kaminski's unit was "ready to actively fight the guerrillas" as well as to carry on a propaganda campaign against "Jewish Bolshevism" and Soviet partisans. Soon after, the commander of the 2nd Army, Generaloberst Rudolf Schmidt, appointed Kaminski Major of the Army Rear Area 532, around Lokot. On 19 July 1942, after approval by the Commander of Army Group Centre, Field Marshal Günther von Kluge, Schmidt and the 532 Area commander, Kaminski received a degree of autonomy and nominal self-governing authority, under the supervision of Major von Veltheim and Colonel Rübsam. Kaminski was appointed the Chief Mayor of the republic of Lokot, and brigade commander of the local militia. He administered local government and established his own courts, jails and newspaper. Private enterprise was encouraged and collective farming abolished.

From June 1942, Kaminski's militia took part in an action, "Operation Vogelsang", as a part of General Werner von Gilsa's Kampfgruppe (taskforce) Gilsa II. In autumn 1942, Kaminski ordered a compulsory draft into the militia of able-bodied men in the area. Units were also reinforced with "volunteers" drafted from Soviet POWs at nearby Nazi concentration camps. Kaminski ordered the collection of abandoned (usually because of minor mechanical failures, or lack of fuel) Soviet tanks and armored cars. By November 1942, his unit was in possession of at least two BT-7 tanks and one 76 mm artillery piece. Owing to a lack of military uniform and boots, the Germans provided Kaminski's brigade with enough used uniforms to outfit four battalions. By late 1942, the militia of the Lokot Republic had expanded to the size of a 14-battalion brigade, of around 8,000 men under arms. By January 1943 the brigade had 9,828 men, including an armored unit with one KV-2 heavy tank, two T-34 medium tanks, three BT-7s, two BT-5 light tanks and three armoured cars (one BA-10, two BA-20).

The brigade was reorganized in the spring of 1943. After the reorganization, the brigade consisted of 5 regiments with 3 battalions each, an anti-aircraft battalion (3 AA guns and 4 heavy machine guns) and an armored unit. A separate "guard" battalion was also created, bringing the total brigade strength up to an estimated 12,000 men.

The brigade took part, with German units, in the May–June 1943 Operation Zigeunerbaron ("Gypsy Baron"). Following this operation, the brigade was part of Operation Citadel, the offensive to destroy the Kursk salient. This operation was followed by similar operations, Freischütz and Tannhäuser, where the brigade, together with other units under German command, was involved in action against partisans and also took part in reprisal operations against the civilian population.

In the summer of 1943, the brigade began to suffer many desertions, due in part to the recent Soviet victories, but also due in part to the efforts of the partisans to "turn" as many of Kaminski's troops as possible. As a part of these efforts, there were several attempts on Kaminski's life. Each time, Kaminski narrowly avoided death and any captured conspirators were punished by execution. Several German officers passing through Lokot reported seeing bodies hanging from gallows outside Kaminski's headquarters. Fearing a breakdown in command, a German liaison staff was attached to Kaminski's HQ to restructure the brigade and return stability to the unit. According to post-war Soviet estimates, up to 10,000 civilians were killed during the existence of the Kaminski formation in Lokot.

== In Belarus ==
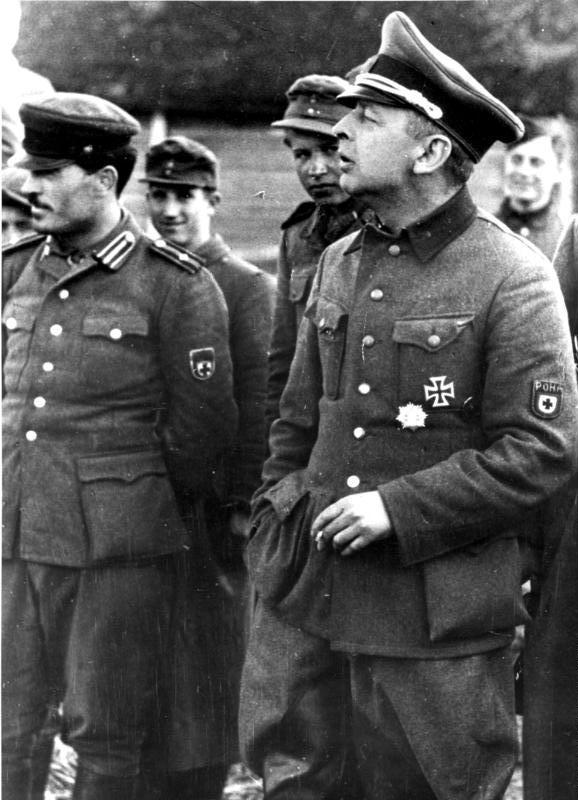
Bronislav Kaminski and personnel of the Kaminski Brigade, during operation "Frühlingsfest", Belarus, May 1944

After the failure of the German Operation Citadel, Soviet counter offensives forced the brigade to retreat. On 29 July 1943 Kaminski issued orders for the evacuation of the property and families of the RONA brigade and the Lokot authorities. Up to 30 thousand persons (10-11 thousand of them were brigade members) were transferred by the Germans to the Lepel area of Vitebsk in Belarus by the end of August 1943. The brigade, together with "evacuated" civilians, finally settled in the Lepel area of Vitebsk. This area had active partisans, and the brigade was involved in heavy combat for the rest of the year.

During the retreat, desertions from the brigade increased greatly, and the entire formation seemed close to disintegration. When the commander of the Second Regiment, Major Tarasov, decided to join the Soviet partisans with all his regiment (he was offered amnesty if his entire regiment joined the partisans), Kaminski flew to his headquarters and according to one account, strangled him and eight others in front of his men. Despite this, up to 200 people deserted within the following two days. By the beginning of October 1943, the brigade had lost two thirds of its personnel, while still in possession of 12 tanks (8 of them T-34s), one 122 mm, three 76 mm and eight 45 mm artillery pieces.

At the end of 1943, after German withdrawal from Russia to Belarus, local Belarus police, Soviet prisoners of war and convicts freed from prison were incorporated into the brigade. The force became part of the Waffen-SS and was formed as Stormtroopers Brigade "Kaminski". On 27 January 1944, Himmler rewarded Kaminski's "achievements" by decorating him with the Iron Cross, 2nd Class, and on the same day with the Iron Cross, 1st Class.

On 15 February 1944, Kaminski issued an order for the brigade and Lokot administration to retreat further west to the Dzyatlava area in western Belarus. At this point, the brigade's ranks were replenished by the addition of police forces from Belarus. In March 1944, the brigade was renamed Volksheer-Brigade Kaminski. From 11 April 1944, it was attached to SS-Kampfgruppe von Gottberg, which also included the notorious Dirlewanger unit, and participated in a mass murder and security operations: Regenschauer (up to 7,000 "bandits" reported as killed), Frühlingsfest (7,011 "bandits" reported as killed and 1,065 weapons captured) and Kormoran (7,697 "bandits" reported as killed and 325 weapons captured). During these operations, local civilians were murdered as "suspected partisans" or deported as slave laborers, their villages burnt down.

== In the SS ==
In June 1944, the brigade was absorbed as a part of the Waffen-SS and renamed Waffen-Sturm-Brigade RONA, with Kaminski being given the rank of Waffen-Brigadeführer der SS on 1 August 1944, the only man with such rank.

As the result of Operation Bagration, the anti-partisan activities of the brigade were halted and its personnel (6–7,000 people, though some sources state 3–4,000) were collected at the SS training camp Neuhammer. Plans were made for a non-German SS Division, and the structure was laid down for the 29.Waffen-Grenadier-Division der SS (russische Nr.1). On 1 August 1944 Kaminski received a new rank - Waffen-Brigadeführer and Major-General of the Waffen-SS.

== Warsaw Uprising ==
In 1944 Kaminski took part in the crushing of the Warsaw Uprising, in the Ochota area, where the Kaminski Brigade committed numerous atrocities (murder, rape and robbery). His troops committed almost 700 murders though numbering only 1% of German forces at the time of the Warsaw uprising. Kaminski thought himself to have direct authority from Reichsführer-SS Heinrich Himmler and he did not want to accept orders from SS-Obergruppenführer Erich von dem Bach-Zelewski, who was in charge of German forces in Warsaw.

The Warsaw Uprising began 1 August 1944. On 4 August 1944, a combat-ready regiment of the brigade was ordered to assist in crushing the rebellion. SS-Gruppenführer Heinz Reinefarth was placed in charge of Kampfgruppe Reinefarth, a pacification unit which consisted of the Kaminski along with the Dirlewanger and several other police and SS rear area units. Hitler personally requested Kaminski's assistance, and the latter obliged by gathering a task force of 1,700 unmarried men and sending them (some sources mentioned that they had four T-34 tanks, one SU-76 and a few artillery pieces) to Warsaw as a mixed regiment under field command of Kaminski's brigade chief-of-staff, Waffen-Sturmbannführer Ivan Frolov. Later in 1945 Frolov stated that the regiment had up to 1,600 men and 7 artillery pieces and 4 mortars.

Frolov noted in 1944 that Kaminski gave his men permission to loot and many did. Kaminski's brigade soon lost any combat worthiness and Kaminski focused entirely on collecting valuables stolen from civilian homes. Perhaps 10,000 residents of Warsaw were killed in the Ochota massacre, most murdered by Kaminski's men.

== Death ==
Heinrich Himmler used the misconduct of the Warsaw group as a pretext for having Kaminski and his leadership executed after trial by court martial in Litzmannstadt (Łódź). They were tried for stealing the property of the Reich, as the stolen property was to have been delivered to Himmler, but Kaminski and his men had attempted to keep it for themselves. Also executed with Kaminski was his brigade chief-of-staff Waffen-Obersturmbannführer Ilya Shavykin, his driver, and his brigade surgeon, F.N. Zabora, and his translator, G. Sadovsky.

The men of the brigade were given the false explanation that Kaminski had been killed by Polish partisans. When Kaminski's men rejected this explanation, the Gestapo took Kaminski's car, pushed it into a ditch, shot it up with a machine gun, and smeared goose blood all over it, as evidence. The demoralized unit was soon moved out of town and stationed to the north, far from any partisan activity.

The death of Kaminski and the unreliability of his troops as a combat unit brought the plans to expand the Kaminski Brigade to a division to an end. After Kaminski's death, his unit was placed under the command of SS-Brigadeführer and Generalmajor der Polizei Christoph Diehm.

== Awards and decorations ==
- Iron Cross of 1939
  - 1st Class (27 Jan 1944)
  - 2nd Class (27 Jan 1944)
- Eastern Front Medal
- Anti-Partisan Guerrilla Warfare Badge (31 July 1944)
- Ostvolk Medal 1st and 2nd class (1944)
- Wound Badge in Black
