= Archdiocese of the Goths and the Northlands =

The Archdiocese of the Goths and the Northlands, also called the Russian Catacomb Church of True Orthodox Christians, is a church in affiliation with the Catacomb Church which self-identifies as Eastern Orthodox and is not recognized by or in communion with any other Eastern Orthodox Christian church.

== Creation ==
The church was established in 1994 in Moscow by Aleksey Sievers, who was ordained archbishop under the name Amvrosij (Ambrosius). It has been a registered ecclesiastical and religious body in Sweden since 2008.

It claims apostolic succession through the Russian True Orthodox Church, and territorial jurisdiction deriving from the Metropolitanate of Gothia and Kaphas, the church of the Crimean Goths in the Principality of Theodoro. The Metropolitanate of Gothia was under the jurisdiction of the Ecumenical Patriarch until 1783, when, subsequent to the Russian conquest of the Crimea, it was transferred to the Russian Orthodox Church.

It also claims to be the earliest church authority in Scandinavia, with presence preceding the Ansgar mission, allegedly with the (now ruined) St Laurentius Church in the island of Gotland.

== Historiography ==
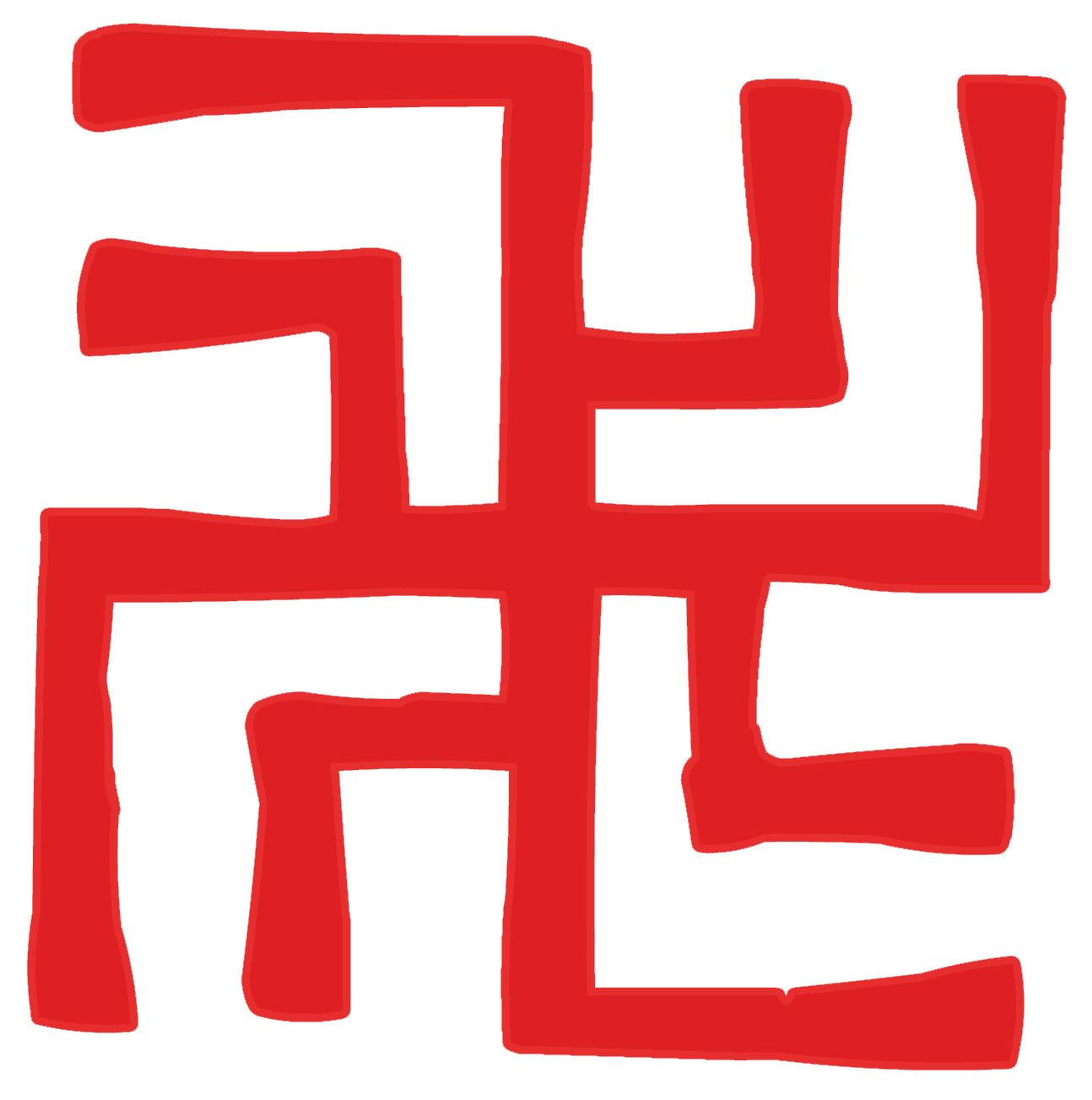
One of the symbols of the church, Crux Dissimulata.

According to Aleksey "Ambrosius" Sievers, Christianity came to the Goths as early as the mid-1st century by a missionary journey of Andrew the Apostle, long before their conversion to Arianism under the episcopate of Ulfilas. "The 'eastern' ecclesiastical jurisdiction in Västergötland, Östergötland and in Gotland was so obvious to anyone at the time that even Rome sent its missionary bishop, Saint Ansgar, to Svealand where Christianity in comparison was relatively weak at that time. It's fairly realistic to speak of Old Gothic (Byzantine) and Celtic (a little later Anglo-Saxon) influence in Sweden, instead of Roman".

These claims run counter to the general 20th-century consensus of historians, but there is some more recent research which seems to corroborate that Christianity may have been present in Russia earlier than previously thought, from as early as the 8th or 9th century, via Byzantine transmission. This supposed cultural contact reflects the Viking Age (9th-century) Rus expansion eastward, establishing the so-called Rus' Khaganate on the margins of the Byzantine sphere of influence.

== Nazism ==
On 6 June 2005, Konstantin Voskoboinik and Bronislav Kaminski were canonised by church. The church also has icons of Adolf Hitler who is venerated as a saint for his fight against Bolshevism as "Athaulf the Holy, the Leader of Germany" and the church annually celebrates the anniversary of the beginning of Operation Barbarossa. The church also utilizes as its symbol a sort of swastika, called Crux Dissimulata, allegedly an early Christian symbol.

== Literature ==
- Kiminas, Demetrius (2009). The Ecumenical Patriarchate: A History of Its Metropolitanates with Annotated Hierarch Catalogs. Wildside Press LLC. ISBN 9781434458766.
