= Zaskarki =

Village in Vitebsk Region, Belarus

Zaskarki Заскаркі (Belarusian) Заскорки (Russian)
- Village
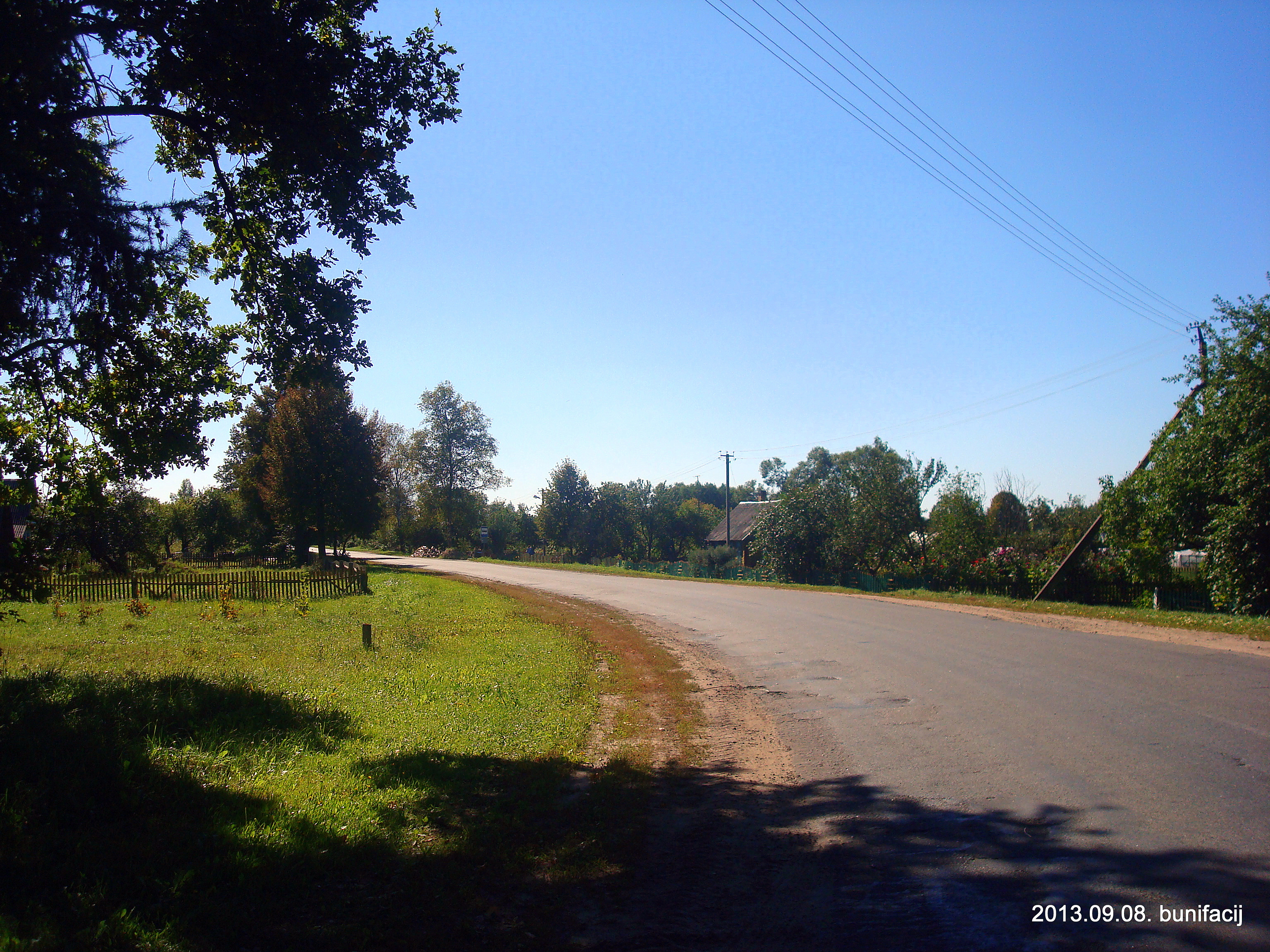

- Location in Belarus
- Coordinates: 55°23′N 28°39′E
- Country: Belarus
- Region: Vitebsk Region
- District: Polatsk District

Area
  - Total: 53.64 km^{2} (20.71 sq mi)

Population (2009)
  - Total: 135
  - Density: 2.52/km^{2} (6.52/sq mi)
- Time zone: UTC+3 (MSK)

Zaskarki (Belarusian: Заскаркі, romanized: Zaskarki; Russian: Заскорки, romanized: Zaskorki) is a village in Polatsk District, Vitebsk Region, Belarus. As of 2009 the population was 135.

The Ushacha River flows through the town.

== History ==
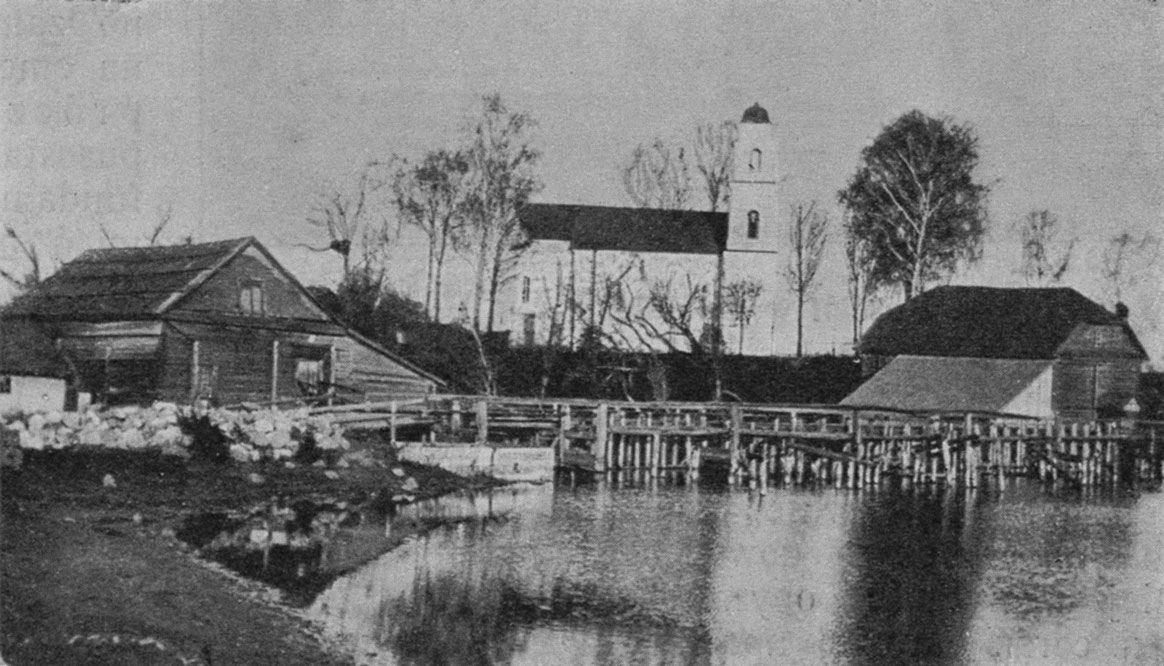
Zaskarki in 1913.

A church was built in the town in 1792. It would be destroyed during World War II.

A land auction was held in Zaskarki in 1863.

=== World War 2 ===
During Operation Barbarossa, the town was declared the capital of the Republic of Old Believers, a self-proclaimed "autonomous republic" under Nazi Germany led by a village elder, Mikhail Yevseyevich Zuyev.
