= Lokotok =

Lokotok Локоток
- Settlement
- Location within Altai Krai Location within Russia
- Coordinates: 51°15′N 81°49′E
- Country: Russia
- Region: Altai Krai
- District: Zmeinogorsky District
- Time zone: UTC+7:00

Lokotok (Russian: Локоток) is a rural locality (a settlement) in Oktyabrsky Selsoviet, Zmeinogorsky District, Altai Krai, Russia. The population was 138 as of 2013. There are 4 streets.

== Geography ==
Lokotok is located 32 km northwest of Zmeinogorsk (the district's administrative centre) by road. Predgorny and Oktyabrsky are the nearest rural localities.
