= Russian People's Labour Party =

Russian People's Labour Party Русская трудовая народная партия
- Leader: Semyon Maltsev
- Founded: 1941; 1942
- Dissolved: 1942; 1943
- Headquarters: Oflag XIII-B, Hammelburg
- Membership: 800−3,500 (1942 est.)
- Ideology: Anticommunism; Russian nationalism Fascism
- a: Reorganized itself in the summer of 1942.

The Russian People's Labour Party (Russian: Русская трудовая народная партия; Russkaya trudovaya narodnaya partiya, RTNP), or Russian National Labour Party, was a collaborationist organisation, formed by the administration of Oflag XIII-B POW camp from the imprisoned Soviet Russian members of the Red Army in 1941. All "party" activities were overseen by German counter-intelligence (Abwehr).

Its stated political aims were;

"With the help of the Germans, the Soviet authorities were to be overthrown. Private property was to be restored, and a state with a democratic republican regime was to be established."

The party program was published in November 1941 (according to some accounts, on the November 7th anniversary of the October Revolution), and was distributed among the prisoners.

In August 1941, a Committee for the Struggle Against Bolshevism was established which would form the basis for the RTNP. The party was founded in a German Army officer prisoner-of-war camp (Offizierslager), located in Hammelburg.

The known members of the "party" were:

- Semyon Maltsev, President of the Central Committee of RTNP
- Ivan Blagoveshchensky (1941), and later Fyodor Truhin, Head of the Military Department
- Major A. P. Filippov, Head of the Intelligence Department
- Sergey Sverchkov, Head of the Propaganda Department
- Lieutenant colonels Lyubimov and Shatov, Colonels Petrov, Meandrov, Brodnikov, General M. V. Bogdanov.

RNTP carried out propaganda work and published its newspaper Path of the Motherland (Russian: Путь Родины). In 1942, RTNP tried to establish contacts with the imprisoned Yakov Dzhugashvili, but failed. The "party" also positioned itself as a sabotage-and-reconnaissance organisation, and it put forward various projects, including the formation of a volunteer anti-Soviet army, but none of them were accepted. The Nazis regarded RNTP rather as a tool to detect the unloyal prisoners (more than 2 thousand POWs were handed over to the Gestapo by the secret department of the "party"), and the existence of the organization was limited to the perimeter of the camp. In June 1942, due to a severe outbreak of typhus and numerous casualties, RNTP was dissolved, and 30 of its most active members were sent to propaganda school. It was later reorganised under Unternehmen Zeppelin, and in August 1942, the number of active members was 120. RNTP officially ceased to exist in 1943.
