= Zuyev Republic =

Government in German-occupied Byelorussia, 1941–1947

Zuyev Republic: Рэспубліка Зуева (Belarusian); Республика Зуева (Russian)
- 1941–1947
- Status: Semi-autonomous area
- Capital: Zaskarki
- Common languages: Belarusian
  - 1941-1944: Mikhail Yevseyevich Zuyev
- Historical era: World War II
  - Established: 1941
  - Disestablished: 1947
- Currency: Soviet ruble, Reichsmark
- Today part of: Belarus

The Zuyev Republic (Note: Belarusian: Рэспубліка Зуева, Respublika Zujeva), also known as the Republic of Old Believers (Note: Belarusian: Рэспубліка старавераў, Respublika staravieraŭ), was an autonomous government in German-occupied Byelorussia during the Second World War. Located near Polotsk, the "republic" was composed primarily of villages inhabited by Old Believers. Its starosta was Mikhail Yevseyevich Zuyev, for whom it was named.

== Establishment ==
Shortly after the beginning of Operation Barbarossa, while Red Army troops were retreating from the Byelorussian Soviet Socialist Republic, Mikhail Yevseyevich Zuyev, the starosta of the Old Believer village of Zaskarki, declared an autonomous republic under Nazi Germany after consulting with his villagers. The self-declared "republic" was headquartered in Zaskarki, and initially limited to the borders of that village. A self-defence militia was organised, which 300 people (including women) joined. Approximately 100 people were permanent soldiers. Under the republic, private property was restored and Old Believer churches were reopened.

== Conflict with partisans ==
Before long, the villages came into conflict with the Belarusian partisans. Seven partisans came to the village asking for food, as well as assistance in setting up a local base for the partisan forces. In response, Zuyev had them killed, and the militia acquired their weapons. Before long, another group of partisans came and requested food. The village militia, now armed, demanded to be left alone. This began the conflict between the Zuyev Republic and the Soviet partisans. Around the same time, two other nearby villages, also in conflict with partisans, joined the republic. By 20 December 1941, the republic's militia was running out of ammunition. Zuyev ventured to Polotsk, where he requested weapons and ammunition from the local German garrison. They gave him 50 rifles and several boxes of ammunition, in turn for guarantees to uphold logistics and ensure the absence of partisans in the area of the republic.

Following this, the militia was organised into an army. Discipline was harsh, with offences being punished with extensive prison time, flogging, and executions. Punishments were handed down by councils of higher-ranking officers, who would be selected to determine the appropriate course of action. Around this time, multiple villages joined up with the Zuyev Republic, and a raid was conducted on a village under control of partisans.

According to the description of an Abwehr officer who visited the republic, the area was heavily militarised; villages were surrounded by barbed wire, and manned bunkers stood at village entrances. The German garrison did not interfere in the government of Zuyev, and, in turn, the republic supplied German soldiers with necessities such as food, hay, and firewood. At this time, the Republic's population was roughly 3,000. The republic also had relations with the National Alliance of Russian Solidarists.

== Estonian SS incident ==
In May 1942, an Estonian SS police battalion, which had been tasked with clearing partisans in the area, entered the territory of the republic. A tense standoff quickly began, as Zuyev quarrelled with the commander of the Estonian battalion. Zuyev claimed that there were no partisans in the area, and the Estonians had no reason to be there. After the Estonians refused to leave, Zuyev threatened to attack the Estonians. The Estonians, outnumbered, conceded, and eventually left. Following the incident, Zuyev travelled to Polotsk, and informed the garrison commander of the occurrence. The Estonian SS battalion was reprimanded in response, and the autonomy of the republic was maintained.

== Collapse ==
By 1943, the Soviet partisans were making major gains. Airplanes from the Red Army were delivering extensive aid. The Zuyev Republic, on the other hand, was receiving decreased amounts of resources from Germany, and in turn more was being demanded. It was necessary on several occasions for Zuyev to negotiate with the partisans. In 1944, the German garrison proposed that the republic be extended, and receive large shipments of military equipment, including artillery. Zuyev refused, by now certain that Soviet rule would return to Byelorussia, and fled westwards.

== Aftermath ==
The fate of the Zuyev Republic, save for its dissolution, is shrouded in mystery. According to some accounts, fighting continued until 1947. According to others, however, the Zuyev Republic ended with its evacuation. Several of the Old Believers fled to South America, as well as the United States. The remaining soldiers of the republic (around 200 people) received anywhere from 5 to 25 years in prison.

The fate of Mikhail Zuyev is also, for the most part, unknown. As he fled west, he joined the Russian Liberation Army under Andrey Vlasov, rising to the rank of second lieutenant. There are claims that following the war, he fled to France and later Brazil or surrendered to the British military forces. However, records of the Obsk correctional labour camp, located near Salekhard, note the death of a person named Mikhail Yevseyevich Zuyev, born in 1884 in Polotsk district.

== See also ==
- Lokot Republic, another collaborationist local government.
- Rossono Republic, another collaborationist local government.
- Petukhov Republic, another collaborationist local government.
