= Fyodor Truhin =

Russian Nazi collaborator (1896–1946)

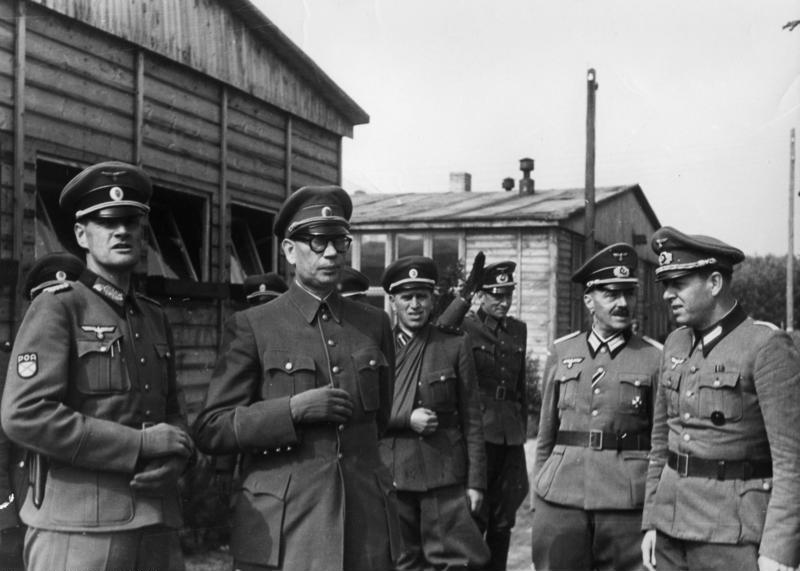
- Truhin (far left) and Andrei Vlasov at Dabendorf

Personal details
- Born: 29 February 1896 Kostroma, Russian Empire
- Died: 1 August 1946 (aged 50) Butyrka Prison, Soviet Union
- Party: Russian People's Labour Party (1941–1943); National Alliance of Russian Solidarists (1942–1945)
- Awards: Order of the Red Banner

Military service
- Allegiance: Russian Empire / Republic (1916–1917); RSFSR (1918–1922); Soviet Union (1922–1941); Nazi Germany (1941–1944); KONR (1944–1945)
- Rank: Major General
- Battles/wars: World War I; Russian Civil War; World War II; Baltic Operation; Bratislava–Brno Offensive

Fyodor Ivanovich Truhin (Russian: Фёдор Ива́нович Трухи́н, also Romanized Fedor, Trukhin; 26 December 1896 – 1 August 1946) was a Soviet major general during World War II. Following his capture during the Baltic Operation, he defected to Nazi Germany, later becoming a leading member of the Committee for the Liberation of the Peoples of Russia and the National Alliance of Russian Solidarists. In the aftermath of the German defeat he was captured by pro-Soviet Czech partisans, who in turn transferred him to the Soviet Union where he was executed for treason.

== Military career ==
Fyodor Truhin was born on 29 February 1896, in Kostroma. Truhin's father Ivan was the leader of the Kostroma Governorate's nobility, and served as a state councillor after retiring from his service in the 1st Grenadier Artillery Brigade in the rank of captain. His mother Nadezhda descended from the Tregubov noble family. Truhin graduated from primary school in 1906, enrolling into the 2nd Kostroma Gymnasium from which he graduated in 1914. During the course of his studies at the gymnasium Truhin became a member of a secret revolutionary organization. He then went on to study law at the Moscow State University, dropping out after finishing his second semester. In 1916, Truhin graduated from the 2nd Moscow Praporshchik School. In 1917, he became a soldier-elected battalion commander in the 46th Division of the Southwestern Front which fought in the First World War. During the course of the Russian Civil War, Truhin joined the Red Army, fighting on the Southwestern Front against the Ukrainian People's Republic, Poland and various insurgent bands. In November 1918, he was appointed commander of the Kostroma Reserve Cavalry Regiment, a year later he was transferred to the 363rd Rifle Regiment where he led a company. In July 1920, he became a battalion commander, taking over the 362nd Rifle Regiment in October. In January 1921, Truhin went on sick leave. In the meantime his father and older brother were executed for organizing an anti-Bolshevik uprising in the Kostroma Governorate.

In September 1922, Truhin enrolled into the M. V. Frunze Military Academy. In 1924, he was awarded the Order of the Red Banner. Following his graduation in August 1925, Truhin was appointed commander of the 133rd Rifle Regiment of the 45th Rifle Division. In September 1926, he was appointed staff commander of the 7th Rifle Division. In 1931, he was appointed staff commander of the 12th Rifle Corps. In February 1932, he began teaching at the Frunze Military Academy. In 1935, he was promoted to colonel. On 5 June 1940, Truhin was promoted to major general. On 28 January 1941, Truhin was promoted to deputy staff commander of the Baltic Military District. Six days after the Soviet Union entered World War II, Truhin became deputy staff commander of the Northwestern Front. A day earlier he was tasked with overseeing the withdrawal of Soviet troops in the area of Panevėžys during the course of the Baltic Operation. Truhin's car was attacked by several German armored vehicles 8 kilometres (5.0 miles) south of Jakobstadt. His adjutant was killed while he was wounded and captured. On 30 June 1941, Truhin was taken to the Schtalulelen prisoner of war camp and later transferred to Oflag XIII-D in Hammelburg. On 6 October, he was declared missing in action.

== Defection ==
In October 1941, Truhin signed a document declaring his allegiance to Nazi Germany and joined an anti-communist collaborationist organization founded by Soviet prisoners of war, the Russian People's Labour Party, in which he later became "the head of the military department". On 15 March 1942, Truhin was transferred to the Wustrau special camp along with fellow major general Dimitry Zakutnyi, where they underwent a course for propagandists. On 24 April, he was appointed commandant of the Zittenhorst propaganda school. On 5 May, the school was visited by Georg Leibbrandt. During a conversation with Leibbrandt, Truhin demanded that the Russian Liberation Army (ROA) be formed and insisted on the transformation of the war into a fight against the regime of Joseph Stalin. In early July he traveled to Abwehr's Warsaw office where he created three espionage training manuals for Russian collaborationist officers, returning to Zittenhorst on the 22nd. In October, Truhin joined the National Alliance of Russian Solidarists (NTS) becoming a member of its executive committee. In February 1943, Truhin conducted a meeting with Andrey Vlasov, accepting his offer of becoming the headmaster of ROA's Dabendorf school. Under his supervision the school had an attendance of 5,000 cadets, destined to become ROA's officer corps. Truhin actively recruited his students into the NTS and hired 10 NTS members as teaching staff, despite the fact that it had been outlawed by the German authorities. At the same time he developed NTS' political programme.

In October 1944, Truhin was appointed staff commander of Committee for the Liberation of the Peoples of Russia's (KONR) armed wing. In January 1945, Truhin took part in the talks between Vlasov and Pyotr Krasnov regarding the formation of a Cossack unit within KONR, advocating the incorporation of the XV SS Cossack Cavalry Corps into KONR. In March, Truhin founded a KONR espionage school outside of Pressburg (Bratislava), enrollment totalling 100 cadets. Despite his noble descent, Truhin opposed the appointment of former White movement members to leading positions within KONR. In the summer of 1945, Truhin led KONR's southern group of armed forces during the Bratislava–Brno Offensive. On 18 April, he ordered his troops to march to the Czech lands in order to unite with KONR's northern formations commanded by Sergei Bunyachenko. On 1 May, Truhin reached Rainbach between Linz and Budweis (České Budějovice). After handing over the troops under his command to the American 26th Infantry Division, Truhin was informed of Vlasov's whereabouts and Bunyachenko's defection to the Czech partisans. On 8 May, Truhin and KONR major general Michael Shapovalov were detained by pro-Soviet Czech partisans outside of Příbram while traveling towards Vlasov. The following day the partisans executed Shapovalov and handed Truhin to the Soviets; he was then taken to Moscow. A criminal investigation into Truhin's defection had been launched on 4 September 1942. He was sentenced to death in December 1945, sentence was canceled on 26 March 1946 in order for SMERSH to continue their investigation. On 11 April, Truhin pleaded guilty to the charge of treason. On 1 August, he was hanged in Butyrka prison. An order dating to 7 January 1947, stripped him of his decorations.
