= Lokot Autonomy =

1942–1943 autonomous government in German-occupied Russia

Coordinates: 52°33′N 34°33′E

Lokot Autonomy Локотское самоуправление (Russian) Локотская республика
- 1941–1944
- Flag Emblem
- Anthem: От края и до края Ot kraja i do kraja ("From land to land")
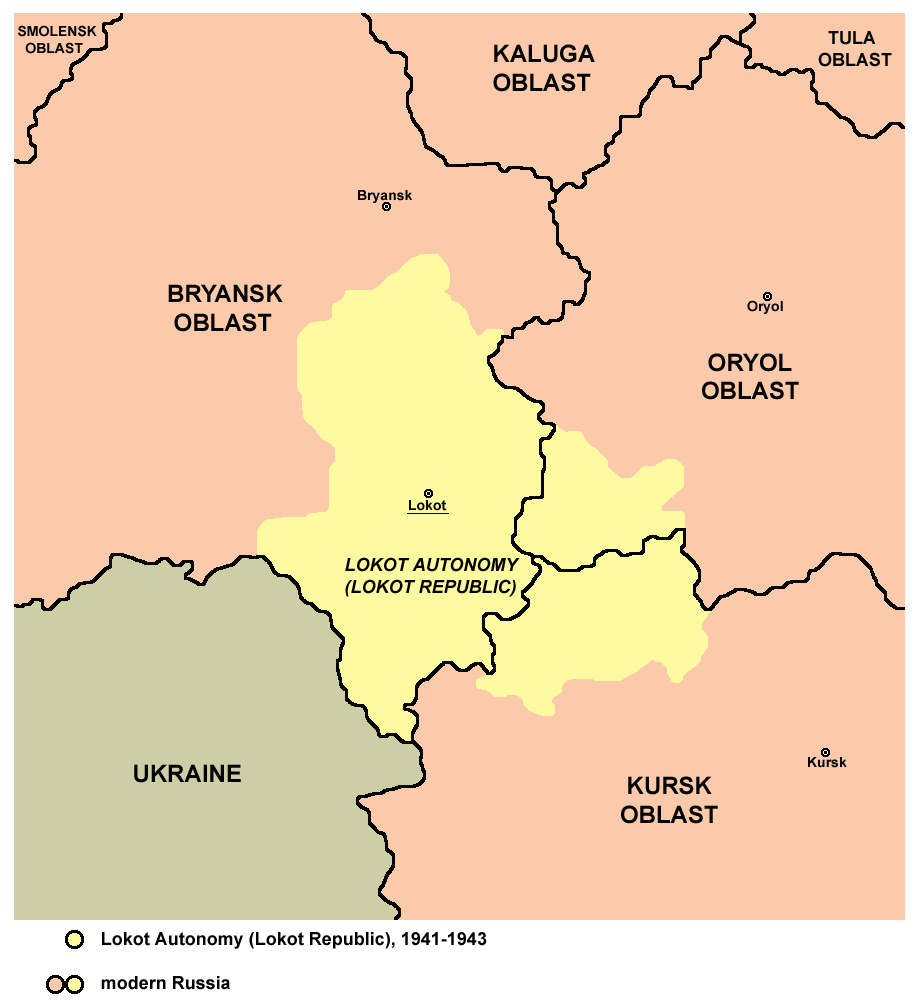
- Status: Semi-autonomous area in Wehrmacht's Army Rear Area 532
- Capital: Lokot, Bryansk Oblast
- Common languages: Russian
- Starosta
  - 1941–1942: Konstantin Voskoboinik
- Ober-Burgomeister
  - 1942–1943: Bronislav Kaminski
- Historical era: World War II
  - Established: 15 November 1941
  - Disestablished: 26 August 1944

Area
  - Total: 10,280 km^{2} (3,970 sq mi)

Population
  - Estimate: 600,000-1,000,000
- Currency: Soviet ruble, Reichsmark
- Today part of: Russia

The Lokot Autonomy (Russian: Ло́котское самоуправле́ние, romanized: Lókotskoye samoupravléniye) or Lokot Republic (Russian: Ло́котская республика, romanized: Lókotskaya respublika, German: Republik Lokot) was an autonomous republic in the occupied territories of the Bryansk, Oryol and Kursk Oblasts of the Soviet Union formed by German troops, specifically Guderian's 2nd Panzer Army, during World War II.

The Wehrmacht entered the area in October 1941 and were forced out in August 1943. A local administration and police were appointed by German occupation authorities in November 1941. The autonomous republic was established in July 1942, when six districts were added to the Lokot district. The autonomy's name was derived from the region's administrative center, the urban-type settlement of Lokot in Oryol Oblast (now located in Bryansk Oblast). The autonomy covered the area of eight raions (the present-day Brasovsky, Dmitriyevsky, Dmitrovsky, Komarichsky, Navlinsky, Sevsky, Suzemsky and Zheleznogorsky districts) now divided between Bryansk, Oryol and Kursk Oblasts.

The Lokot Autonomy was ruled by a Russian civil administration led by Bronislav Kaminski and Konstantin Voskoboinik. The German authorities established the Autonomy to serve as a test case for a Russian collaborating government under the SS in the proposed Reichskommissariat Moskowien.

== History ==
=== Foundation ===
In October 1941, the Nazi German military advanced into the Soviet Union during Operation Barbarossa. They reached the Lokot area near the city of Bryansk and captured it on October 6, 1941. In November 1941 Bronislav Kaminski (an engineer at a local distillery) and Konstantin Voskoboinik (a local technical school teacher) were approached by the German military administration to help them establish a civil administration and local police. Voskoboinik was designated by Germans as starosta of the "Lokot volost." Kaminski became Voskoboinik's deputy. Other deputies appointed were Stepan Mosin and Roman Ivanin (the head of the local militia), both former prisoners.

=== Militia ===
Initially, the militia headed by Voskoboinik numbered no more than 200 men. It assisted Germans in policing the area and committed numerous atrocities against the civilian population loyal to the Soviet authorities or Soviet partisans, Soviet prisoners of war (POWs), Jews and ordinary civilians. By January 1942 the militia's personnel was increased to 400–500.

During a partisan attack headed by Alexander Saburov on January 8, 1942, Voskoboinik was fatally wounded. Kaminski took over the command and further expanded the militia.

In cooperation with German forces, the militia commenced security operations, and by the spring of 1942, the militia had 1,400 armed personnel. The number of Soviet partisans in this area was estimated at 20,000 men; they controlled almost the entire rear of the Army Group Centre's area of operations.

In March 1942, Kaminski's representative to the German 2nd Panzer Army in Oryol gave assurances that Kaminski's unit was "ready to fight the guerrillas actively" and to carry on a propaganda campaign against "Jewish Bolshevism" and Soviet partisans. Soon after that, the commander of the 2nd Army Generaloberst Rudolf Schmidt appointed Kaminski as the mayor of the Korück 532 centered in the township of Lokot. On 19 July 1942, after the Commander of the Army Group Centre, Field Marshal Günther von Kluge gave an official approval, the Lokot administration received some degree of autonomy and nominal self-rule under the supervision of Major von Veltheim and Colonel Rübsam. Kaminsky was appointed the Oberbürgermeister of the Autonomous Administration of Lokot (comprising eight raions) and the brigadier of the local militia.

From June 1942, Kaminski's militia took part in a major anti-partisan operation code-named Operation Vogelsang, as part of General Werner von Gilsa's Kampfgruppe (battle group) Gilsa II.

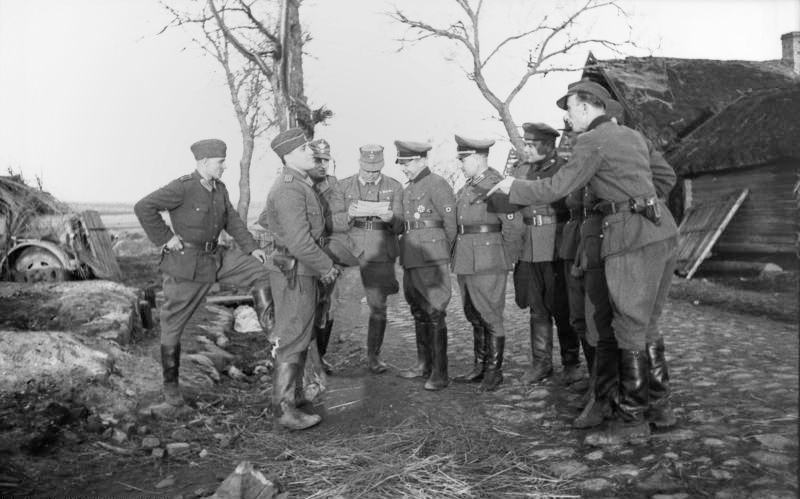
B.V. Kaminsky, RONA headquarters officers and German police officers. Photograph taken on March 21, 1944 by G. Wehmeyer, a serviceman of the 697th Wehrmacht Propaganda Company (3rd Tank Army)

Germans did not interfere in the Lokot Autonomy's affairs as long as their transports were kept safe, and the republic delivered the required food quotas to the Wehrmacht. Kaminski established a court, jails, and newspapers. Collective farms were abolished, and a significant degree of free enterprise was permitted. Kaminski's speeches published in the region's newspapers emphasized that Nazi Germany and Russia "are the same."

The schools (closed after the German invasion) reopened, and a radio station and some theater groups were established in Lokot, Dmitrovsk and Sevsk Newspapers published in the Lokot Autonomy were typical of all newspapers published on Nazi-occupied Russian territories, featuring articles claiming Judeo-Bolshevik crimes along with Nazi propaganda with the usual heavy dose of antisemitism. The Jewish population in the Autonomy was murdered without German assistance: 223 Jews were shot dead in the township of Suzemka, and 39 at Navlya.

In October 1942, Kaminski renamed Lokot township as the town of Voskoboinik. Streets in other townships of the Autonomy were also renamed.

In the autumn of 1942, Kaminski ordered the compulsory draft into the militia of all non-disabled men. Its units were reinforced with the "volunteers" drafted from Soviet POWs at the nearest Nazi concentration camps. Due to the lack of uniforms and boots (some units were barefoot), the Germans provided Kaminski's brigade with used uniforms: these were sufficient for only four battalions. Kaminski ordered the gathering of Soviet tanks and armored cars abandoned in 1941 due to the lack of fuel or minor mechanical failures – by November 1942, his unit had at least two BT-7 tanks and one 76 mm artillery gun.

By late 1942, the militia of the Lokot Autonomy had expanded to the size of a 14-battalion brigade with close to 8,000 men under arms called the Russian National Liberation Army (RONA). From November 19, 1942, to December 1942, Lokot was inspected by Alfred Rosenberg.

In January 1943, the brigade numbered 9,828 people; the armored unit of brigade had in total 15 vehicles:

- two heavy KV-2,
- four medium T-34,
- four BT-7,
- two SU-76 self-propelled guns.
- three armored cars (BA-10, two BA-20).

In the spring of 1943, the brigade's structure was reorganized. There were five regiments created with three battalions in each, an anti-aircraft battalion (three AA guns and four heavy machine guns) and an armored unit. A separate "guard" battalion was created, with brigade strength estimated to be 12,000 men in total.

In May–June 1943, the brigade took part in Operation Zigeunerbaron ("Gypsy Baron") together with other German units. Similar operations followed this operation, such as Freischütz and Tannhäuser, in which the brigade and other units under German command were involved in action against partisans and also took part in reprisal operations against the civilian population.

In the summer of 1943, the brigade began to suffer significant desertions, due in part to the recent Soviet victories and the partisans' efforts to "turn" as many of Kaminski's troops as possible. As a part of these efforts, several attempts on Kaminski's life were carried out. Each time, Kaminski narrowly avoided death and punished the conspirators with execution. Several German officers passing through Lokot reported seeing bodies hanging from gallows outside Kaminski's headquarters. Fearing a breakdown in command, a German liaison staff was attached to Kaminski's HQ to restructure the brigade and return stability to the unit.

After the German failure of Citadel, the Soviet counteroffensives forced the brigade, along with their families, to flee with the retreating Germans. On the 29th of July, 1943, Kaminski issued an order to evacuate the RONA brigade and Lokot authorities' property and families. Germans transferred up to 30 thousand persons (10–11,000 of them were brigade members) to the Lepel area of Vitebsk in Belarus by the end of August 1943.

By September 1943, the force had 10,000 men, divided into:

- 5 infantry regiments, each of 3 battalions,
- one artillery battalion (36 field guns),
- and an armour unit of 24 captured Soviet tanks and armoured vehicles,
- in addition to engineer, signal, and medical units.

According to possibly unreliable post-war Soviet estimates, up to 10,000 civilians were killed by forces loyal to the Lokot Autonomy.

== Armed forces ==
RONA shoulder patches

The republic had its armed forces: the Russian National Liberation Army, RONA (not to be confused with the Russian Liberation Army, ROA).

== "Lepel Republic" ==
From the end of August 1943, Kaminski tried to set up a new "Lepel Republic" in the Lepel area, which met with strong opposition from the local population. Partisans overran this area, and the brigade was involved in heavy combat for the rest of the year.

During the retreat, desertions from the brigade increased significantly, and the entire formation seemed close to disintegration. When the commander of the 2nd Regiment, Major Tarasov, decided to join the partisans with all of his regiment (he was offered amnesty if his entire regiment joined the partisans), Kaminski flew to his headquarters and, according to one account, strangled him and eight others in front of his men. Despite this, up to 200 people deserted within two days.

By the beginning of October 1943, the brigade lost 2/3 of its previous personnel number.

On January 27, 1944, Heinrich Himmler decorated Kaminski with the Iron Cross 2nd Class and the Iron Cross 1st Class on the same day.

On February 15, 1944, Kaminski issued an order to relocate the brigade and Lokot administration further west to the Dyatlovo area in West Belarus.

== War crimes ==
The auxiliary police completely massacred the Jewish population of the area. The chief of the Suzemka area police Prudnikov took part in the massacres. There were 223 Jews shot in Suzemka, and 39 in Navlya.

== After the war ==
After the war, former members of the RONA and supporters of the Lokot Autonomy formed anti-communist guerrilla movement, that slowly degenerated into organized crime groups and was suppressed in 1951.

Some former RONA and Lokot personnel were repatriated by the Western Allies to the Soviet Union. At the end of 1946, the Military Collegium of the Supreme Court of the Soviet Union sentenced Yury Frolov, Stepan Mosin, and several others to death. In the 1950s and 1960s, several other former officials of the Autonomy were apprehended by the KGB; some of them were also sentenced to death, most notably the Lokot Autonomy's executioner Antonina Makarova-Ginzburg, found in 1978 and executed in 1979.

== Cultural references ==
Anatoli Ivanov portrayed the Lokot Republic in his novel Eternal Call (Russian: Вечный зов) and the corresponding TV sequel, which was popular in the Soviet Union.

== See also ==
- Russian Liberation Army
- Russian Liberation Movement
- National Socialist Labor Party of Russia
- Zuyev Republic, another collaborationist local government

== Bibliography ==
- Haslinger, Peter; Tönsmeyer, Tatjana, eds. (2021). Fighting Hunger, Dealing with Shortage (2 vols): Everyday Life under Occupation in World War II Europe: A Source Edition. Brill Publishers. ISBN 9789004461840.
- Yermolov, Igor; Drobyazko, Sergey (2001). "1. Оккупация Орловской области и организация Локотского самоуправления" [1. The occupation of the Oryol region and the organization of the Lokot self-government]. Антипартизанская республика [Anti-Partisan Republic] (in Russian). Moscow.
