= Christoph Diehm =

German SS officer (1892–1960)

- Born: 1 March 1892; Rottenacker, Kingdom of Württemberg, German Empire
- Died: 21 February 1960 (age 67); Rottenacker, Baden-Württemberg, West Germany
- Military career
- Allegiance: German Empire; Weimar Republic; Nazi Germany
- Branch: Imperial German Army; Reichswehr; Schutzstaffel
- Service years: 1914–1925; 1932–1945
- Rank: Leutnant; SS-Brigadeführer and Generalmajor of Police and the Waffen-SS
- Commands: SS and Police Leader, "Shitomir;" "Lemberg;" "Kattowitz"
- Conflicts: World War I World War II
- Awards: Iron Cross, 1st and 2nd class War Merit Cross, 1st and 2nd class with Swords

Christoph Diehm (1 March 1892 – 21 February 1960) was a German SS-Brigadeführer and Generalmajor of the Waffen-SS and police, who served as the SS and Police Leader in Ukraine and Poland during the Second World War.

== Early life ==
Diehm, son of a farmer, was educated in volksschule and secondary school through 1909, and then in 1911 joined the Imperial German Army's 120th Infantry Regiment, based in Ulm. He fought in the First World War from August 1914 with that unit, and with the 247th and 478th Infantry Regiments. He was wounded four times, earning the Iron Cross 1st and 2nd class and the Wound Badge in Silver. After the end of the war, Diehm joined the Freikorps from January 1919 for two years and was then a professional soldier in the Reichswehr, serving with Infantry Regiment 13 in a machine gun company. He attended the army college, attained the rank of Leutnant and left the military in 1925. He then worked in agriculture until 1929. From October 1926 to January 1928 Diehm belonged to the Stahlhelm, the army veterans' organization.

== Peacetime SA and SS career ==
Diehm joined the SA in 1928. From 1929 to 1931, he was the adjutant in SA Untergruppe "Württemberg" and, from 1931, commander of the Gruppe "Südwest." He joined the Nazi Party on 1 March 1930 (membership number 212,531) and transferred from the SA to the SS on 22 March 1932 (SS number 28,461) with the rank of SS-Oberführer.

Diehm became the first commander of SS-Abschnitt (District) X, based in Stuttgart, from March 1932 to July 1933. In mid-July 1933, he was transferred to be the first commander of newly-established SS-Abschnitt XIX in Karlsruhe where he would remain until 15 March 1936. He was promoted to SS-Brigadeführer on 21 March 1934. When he left Karlsruhe in March 1936, he became the commander of the prestigious SS-Abschnitt I, based in Munich, the headquarters of the Nazi Party. He would remain there until 1 March 1939. He was next assigned to a staff position with SS-Oberabschnitt (Main District) "West," based in Düsseldorf.

Becoming involved in politics, Diehm was elected as a Nazi member to the Landtag of Württemberg where he sat from 24 April 1932 to 20 November 1933. Then at the November 1933 parliamentary election, he was elected as a deputy to the national Reichstag from electoral constituency 32, Baden, and he retained this seat until the end of the Nazi regime.

== Second World War ==
Diehm had joined the Wehrmacht as a Leutnant of Reserves in 1936 and, after the outbreak of the Second World War, he served with Infantry Regiment 61 in the Polish campaign. Following the conquest of Poland, he was made chief of police in Gotenhafen (today, Gdynia) from the end of September 1939 to October 1941. During his tenure there, the Intelligenzaktion Pommern took place in the surrounding area when thousands of Polish intellectuals and social elites were murdered by SS and police personnel. Diehm was next transferred to be the Police President of Saarbrücken and Metz until September 1943, attaining the rank of Generalmajor of Police on 1 April 1942.

In September 1943, Diehm was transferred to the office of the Higher SS and Police Leader (HSSPF) "Russland-Süd" Hans-Adolf Prützmann for additional police training and served from January 1944 to the end of February 1944 as the last SS and Police Leader (SSPF) "Shitomir" as the Red Army offensive pushed the Germans out of the area. He was then reassigned and became the last SSPF "Lemberg" of the Government General. While there, he ruthlessly hunted down Jewish refugees in the forests of Galicia. He left that post on 16 September 1944 after the Red Army overran the District of Galicia. He was then briefly the SSPF "Kattowitz" in Upper Silesia. In August and September, Diehm was charged with trying to expand the Kaminski Brigade into the 29th Waffen Grenadier Division of the SS Russian National Liberation Army (1st Russian), but it was never fully operationalized and the effort was abandoned. From 16 September 1944 to 18 January 1945, Diehm served as the Acting HSSPF "Belgien-Nordfrankreich" while the permanent holder of that post, Friedrich Jeckeln, was still in Russia. Appointed a Generalmajor in the Waffen-SS on 9 November 1944, he served as a divisional commander. From January 1945 he also was the Inspector "Südwest" for the Volkssturm, the Nazi paramilitary militia.

== Postwar ==
Serving as a combat commander with the 6th Army, Diehm was taken prisoner by the Red Army on 8 May 1945 near Vienna. He never faced formal prosecution for his role in the Holocaust in Poland. However, he was kept in Soviet captivity for nine years until mid-January 1954. He then returned to Germany, where he lived for a short time in Zuffenhausen, then again with his family in Rottenacker until his death in 1960.

== Awards ==
Diehm earned the following awards and decorations:

- Iron Cross (1914) 2nd and 1st class
- Wound Badge (1918) in silver
- Iron Cross Clasp 2nd and 1st class
- War Merit Cross (1939) 2nd and 1st class with swords
- Wound Badge (1939) in silver
- Golden Party Badge

== Sources ==
- Klee, Ernst (2007). Das Personenlexikon zum Dritten Reich. Wer war was vor und nach 1945. Frankfurt-am-Main: Fischer-Taschenbuch-Verlag. ISBN 978-3-596-16048-8.
- Pohl, Dieter (1997). Nationalsozialistische Judenverfolgung in Ostgalizien 1941–1944. Organisation und Durchführung eines staatlichen Massenverbrechens. Munich: R. Oldenbourg Verlag. ISBN 3-486-56233-9. (full text digitally available, in German).
- Schiffer Publishing Ltd., ed. (2000). SS Officers List: SS-Standartenführer to SS-Oberstgruppenführer (As of 30 January 1942). Schiffer Military History Publishing. ISBN 0-7643-1061-5.
- Yerger, Mark C. (1997). Allgemeine-SS: The Commands, Units and Leaders of the General SS. Schiffer Publishing Ltd. ISBN 0-7643-0145-4.
