= Operation Vogelsang =

German operation in World War II

- Part of German anti-partisan operations in World War II
Date	5–9th of July 1942
Location	Occupied Soviet Territory, Bryansk
Result	German/RONA Victory
Territorial changes	Retreat of the remaining partisans

Belligerents
Germany: Russian People's Liberation Army	Soviet Partisans

Commanders and leaders
Rudolf Schmidt	Unknown

Strength
Unknown	Unknown

Casualties and losses
58 killed 138 wounded	1,193 killed 1,400 wounded 498 captured
- Deportations of around 12,531 people from the region

Operation Vogelsang was a German operation against soviet partisans during World War II. It inflicted heavy casualties on the partisans and forced them to go underground. It was also the first major operation that involved the RONA.

== Operation ==
The Operation begun on 5 July 1942, its objective was to destroy the soviet partisans operating in the region of Bryansk and Roslavl, threatening the lines of communication to Günther von Kluge's Heeresgruppe. The German forces included: one Panzer regiment and two infantry regiments.

The German units encircled the forest area in which the soviet partisans have been operating in. The Germans started advancing further into the center of the area, destroying villages in their path and 'evacuating' civilians who lived there. According to one source, if the Germans kept searching the forest longer than until the 9th of July, they could prevent the partisans from reappearing.

The victory was greatly overexaggerated by the German forces, remaining partisans retreated underground and reappered after the operation ended.
