= Brasovsky District =

Brasovsky District Брасовский район (Russian)
- District
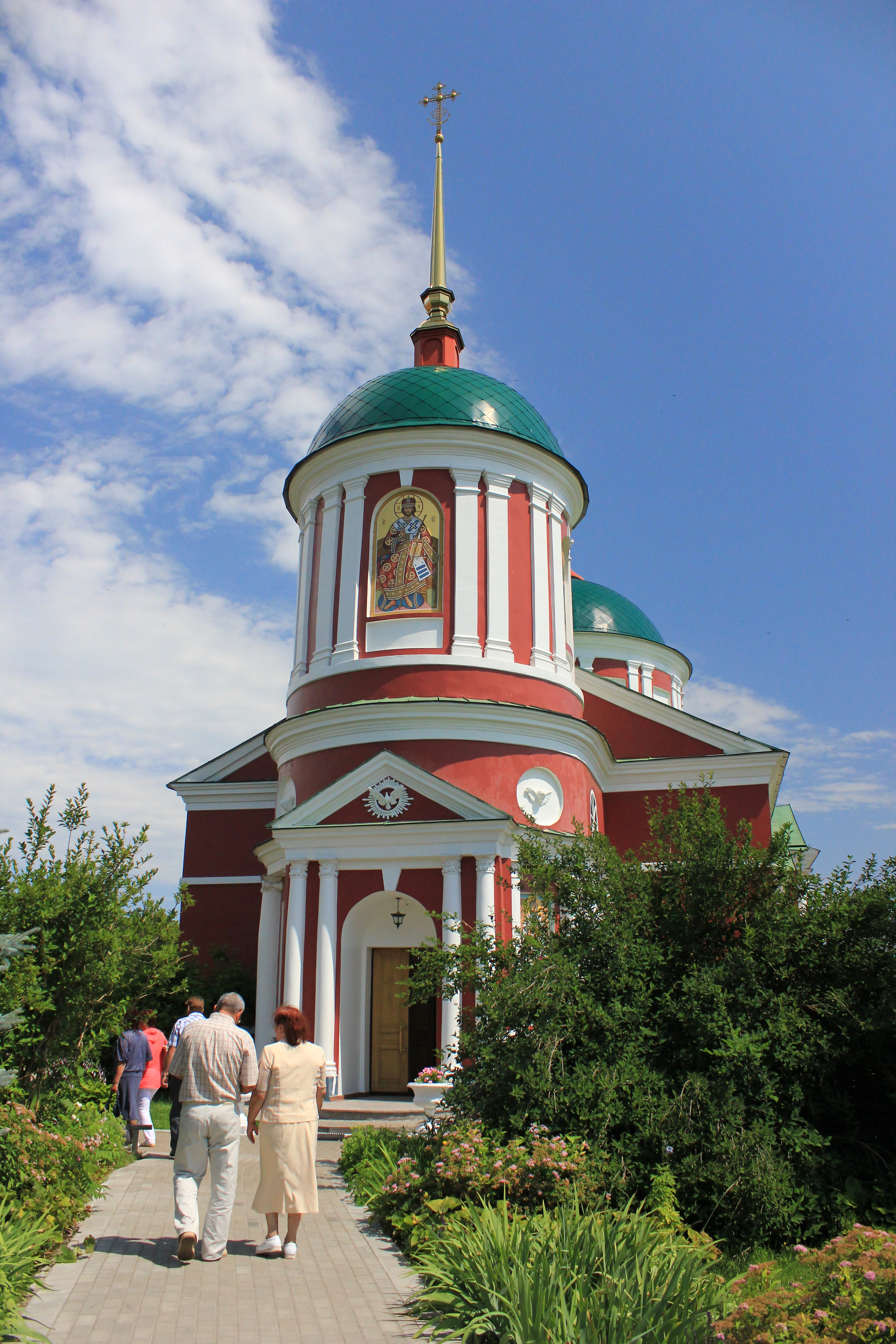
- Monastery Church in Brasovsky District

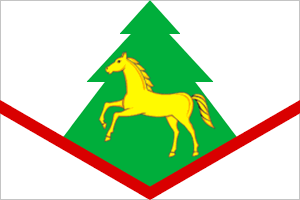
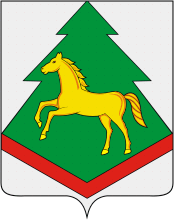
- Flag Coat of arms
- Location of Brasovsky District in Bryansk Oblast
- Coordinates: 52°33′20″N 34°33′30″E
- Country: Russia
- Federal subject: Bryansk Oblast
- Established: 1929
- Administrative center: Lokot

Area
  - Total: 1,185 km^{2} (458 sq mi)

Population (2010 Census)
  - Total: 21,471
  - Density: 18.12/km^{2} (46.93/sq mi)
  - Urban: 46.7%
  - Rural: 53.3%

Administrative structure
  - Administrative divisions: 1 Settlement administrative okrugs, 10 Rural administrative okrugs
  - Inhabited localities: 1 urban-type settlements, 81 rural localities

Municipal structure
  - Municipally incorporated as: Brasovsky Municipal District
  - Municipal divisions: 1 urban settlements, 10 rural settlements
- Time zone: UTC+3 (MSK)
- OKTMO ID: 15604000
- Website: www.brasadmin.org

Brasovsky District (Russian: Бра́совский райо́н) is an administrative and municipal district (raion), one of the twenty-seven in Bryansk Oblast, Russia. It is located in the east of the oblast. The area of the district is 1,185 square kilometers (458 sq mi). Its administrative center is the urban locality (a work settlement) of Lokot. Population: 21,471 (2010 census); 24,972 (2002 Census); 26,873 (1989 Soviet census). The population of Lokot accounts for 46.7% of the district's total population.
