= Lokot, Loktevsky District, Altai Krai =

Lokot Локоть
- Village
- Location within Altai Krai Location within Russia
- Coordinates: 51°11′N 81°11′E
- Country: Russia
- Region: Altai Krai
- District: Loktevsky District
- Time zone: UTC+7:00

Lokot (Russian: Локоть) is a rural locality (a selo) and the administrative center of Loktevsky Selsoviet of Loktevsky District, Altai Krai, Russia. The population was 1,066 as of 2016. There are 14 streets.

== Geography ==
Lokot is located 34 km (21 mi) northwest of Gornyak (the district's administrative centre) by road. Novomikhaylovka is the nearest rural locality.
