= Alexander Saburov =

Soviet Ukrainian and Russian resistance leader (1908–1974)

- Александр Николаевич Сабуров
- Born: 1 August [O.S. 19 July] 1908; Yarushki, Vyatka Governorate, Russian Empire
- Died: 15 April 1974 (aged 65); Moscow, USSR
- Military career
- Allegiance: Soviet Union
- Rank: Major General
- Conflicts: World War II
- Awards: Hero of the Soviet Union

Alexander Nikolayevich Saburov (Russian: Алекса́ндр Никола́евич Сабу́ров; 1 August [O.S. 19 July] 1908 – 15 April 1974) was one of the leaders of Soviet partisan movement in Ukraine and western Russia during World War II.

Saburov was born on 1 August [O.S. 19 July] 1908 to a Russian peasant family in Yarushki, Vyatka Governorate (now part of Izhevsk, Udmurtia); he joined the Communist Party of the Soviet Union in 1932 and the NKVD in 1938.

A few months after the German invasion of USSR in the autumn of 1941, Saburov organized first guerrilla units in Bryansk, Oryol and Sumy regions occupied by the enemy. His partisan unit numbered around 1800 men and during the winter of 1941-42 effectively harassed German troops operating behind the enemy lines. On 18 May 1942 Saburov was awarded the title Hero of the Soviet Union as well as Order of Lenin for personal heroism and his contribution to the Soviet war effort.

At the end of 1942 Saburov moved his partisan unit into Ukraine and operated in central and western Ukraine. Together with Sydir Kovpak he played a key role in the leadership of partisan movement in Ukraine.

In 1944 Saburov was promoted to the rank of major general.

After the war he held high-ranking NKVD positions in Ukraine and in 1954 became one of the heads of the Soviet MVD.

He was a member of the Supreme Soviet of the USSR between 1948 and 1958.

Saburov was awarded Order of the Red Banner, Order of Suvorov, Order of Bogdan Khmelnitsky, Order of the Patriotic War and Order of the Red Star. Alexander Saburov died on 15 April 1974 and is buried at Novodevichy Cemetery in Moscow.

== Awards ==
- Hero of the Soviet Union (18 May 1942)
- Two Orders of Lenin
- Order of the Red Banner
- Order of Suvorov, 2nd class
- Order of Bogdan Khmelnitsky, 1st and 2nd classes
- Order of the Patriotic War, 1st class, twice
- Order of the Red Star
- Medal "Partisan of the Patriotic War" 1st class
- Medal "For the Victory over Germany in the Great Patriotic War 1941–1945"
- Other medals
