= Lokot, Bryansk Oblast =

Lokot Локоть
- Urban-type settlement
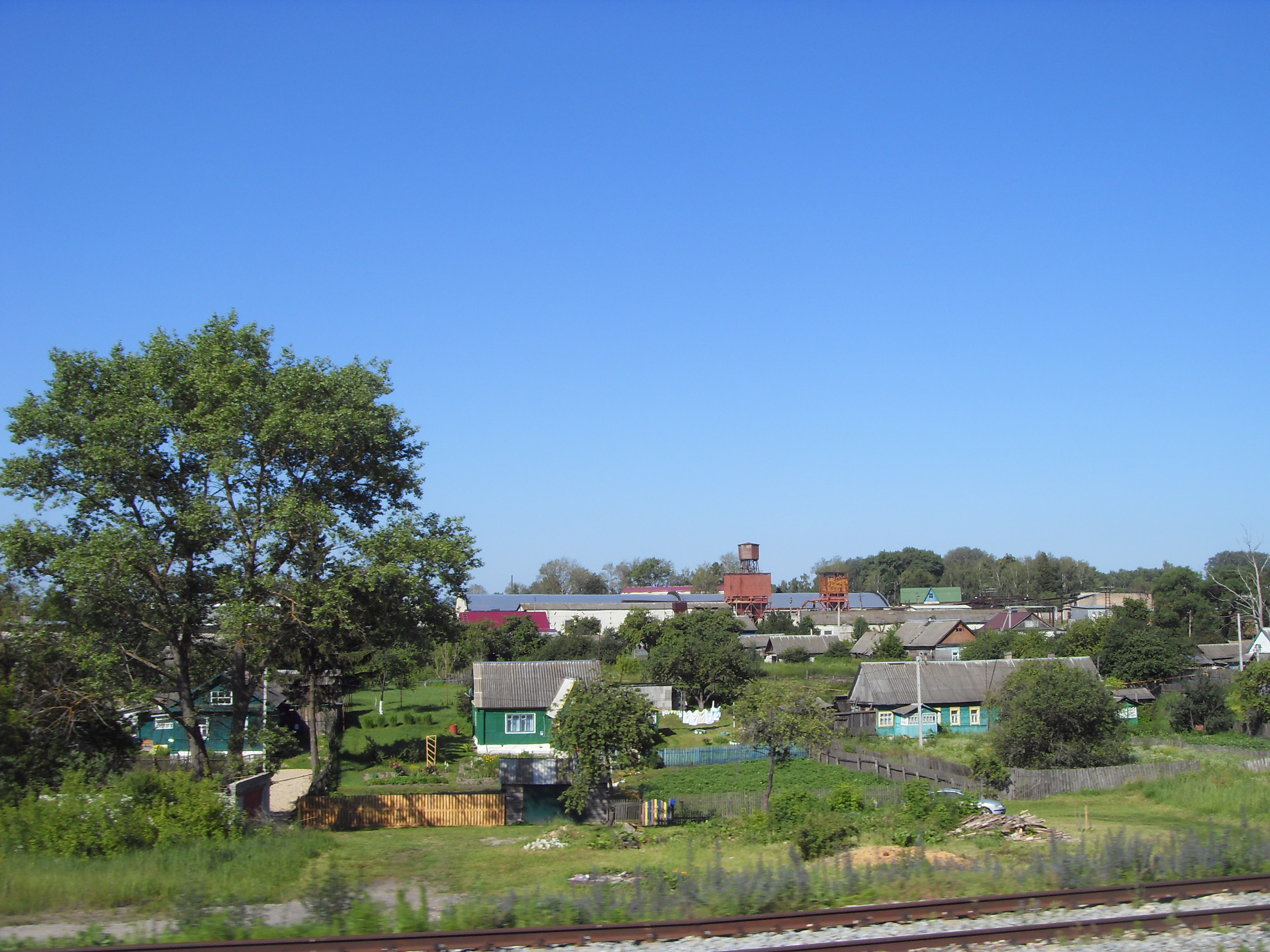

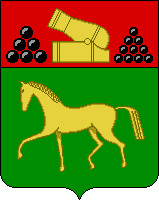
- Coat of arms
- Interactive map of Lokot
- Location of Lokot Lokot (Bryansk Oblast)
- Coordinates: 52°33′20″N 34°33′30″E
- Country: Russia
- Federal subject: Bryansk Oblast
- Administrative district: Brasovsky District

Population (2010 Census)
  - Total: 10,028
  - Estimate (2025): 8,284 (−17.4%)
- Time zone: UTC+3 (MSK)
- Postal code: 242300
- Dialing code: +7 48354
- OKTMO ID: 15604151051

Lokot (Russian: Ло́коть) is an urban locality (a work settlement) and the administrative center of the Brasovsky District of Bryansk Oblast, Russia. Population: 8,469 (2021 census); 10,028 (2010 census); 12,094 (2002 census); 11,191 (1989 Soviet census).

== See also ==
- Lokot Autonomy
