= Zaporizhzhia (region) =

Historical region in central Ukraine

Zaporizhzhia Запоріжжя
- Historical region
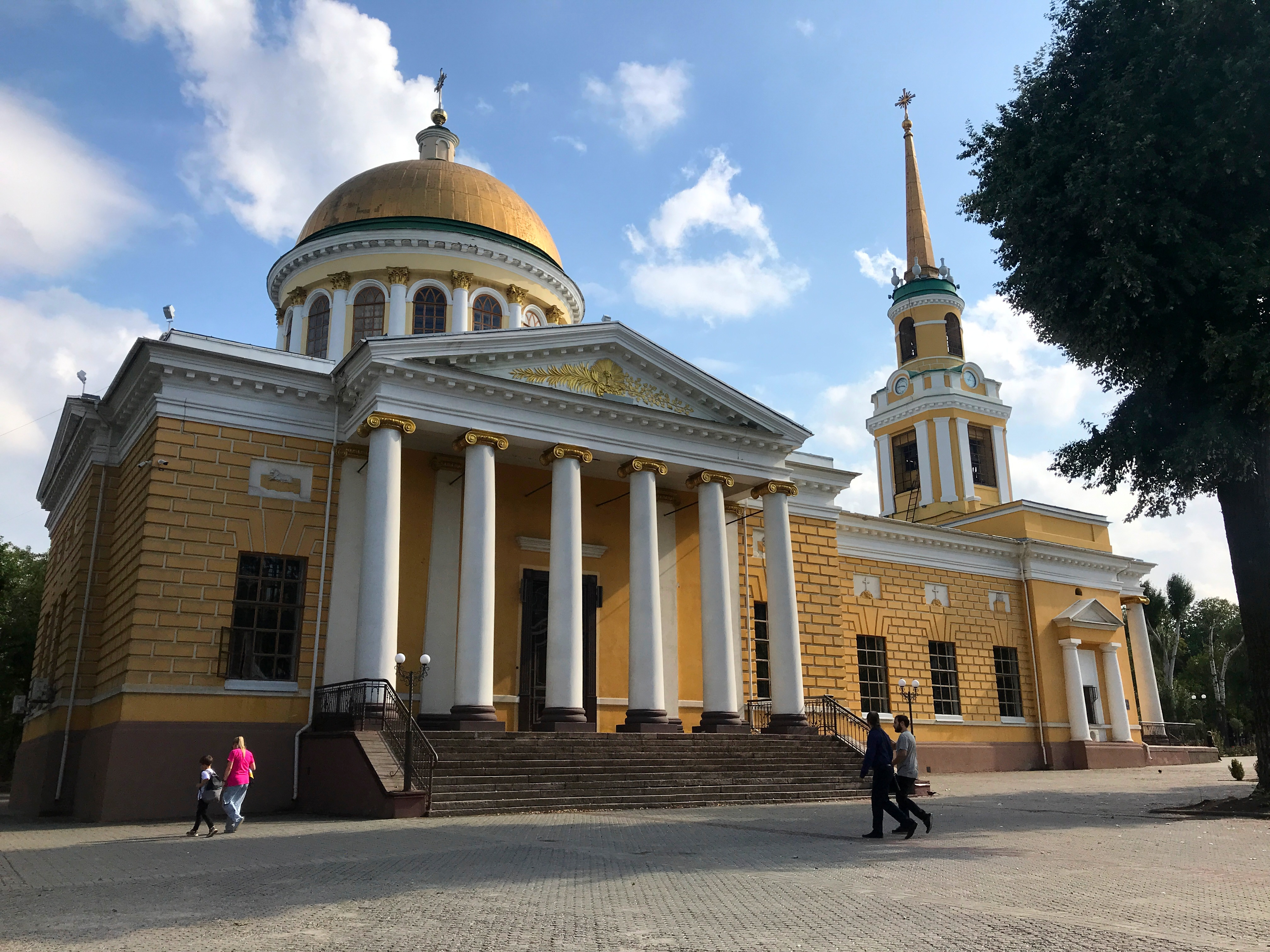
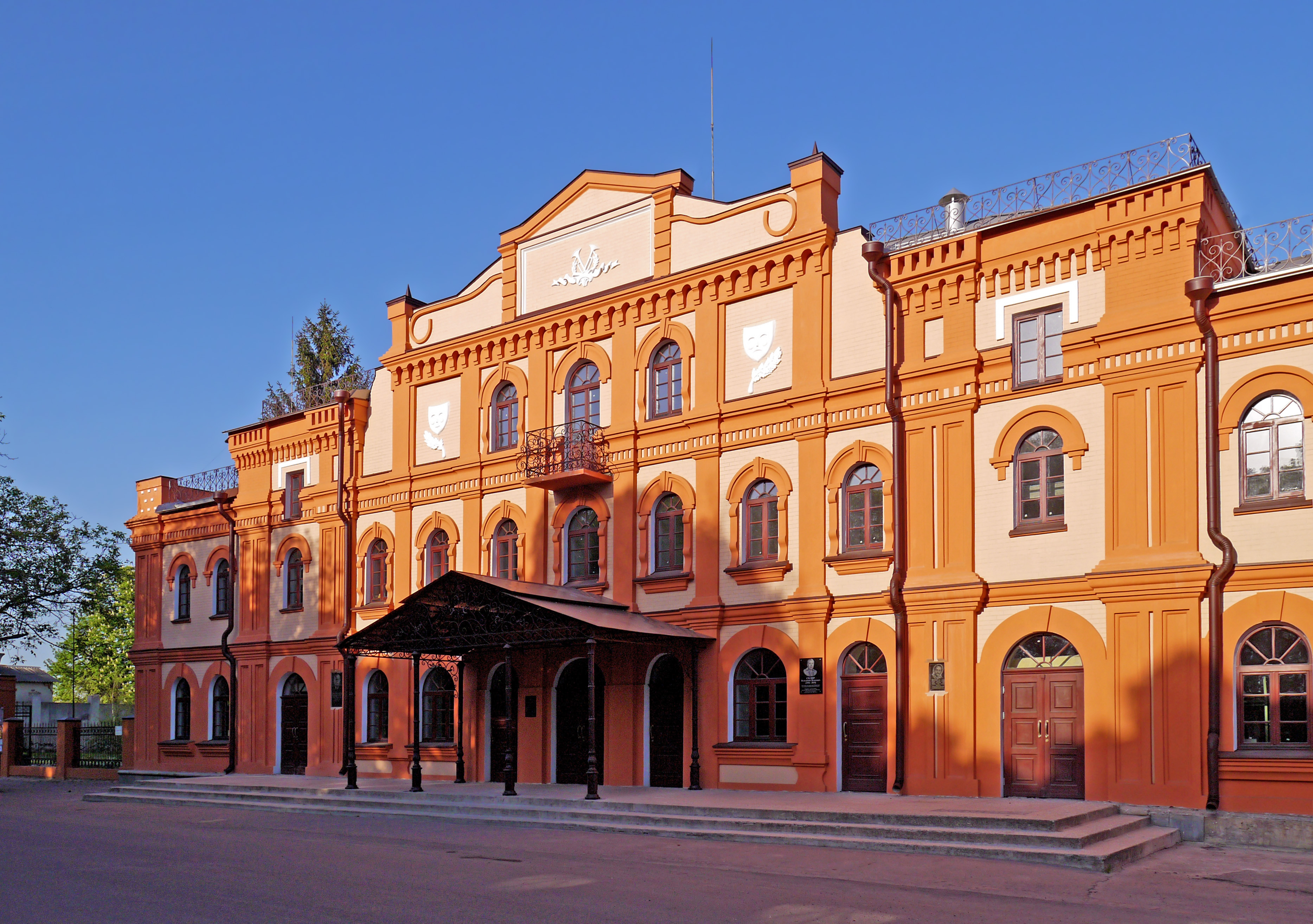
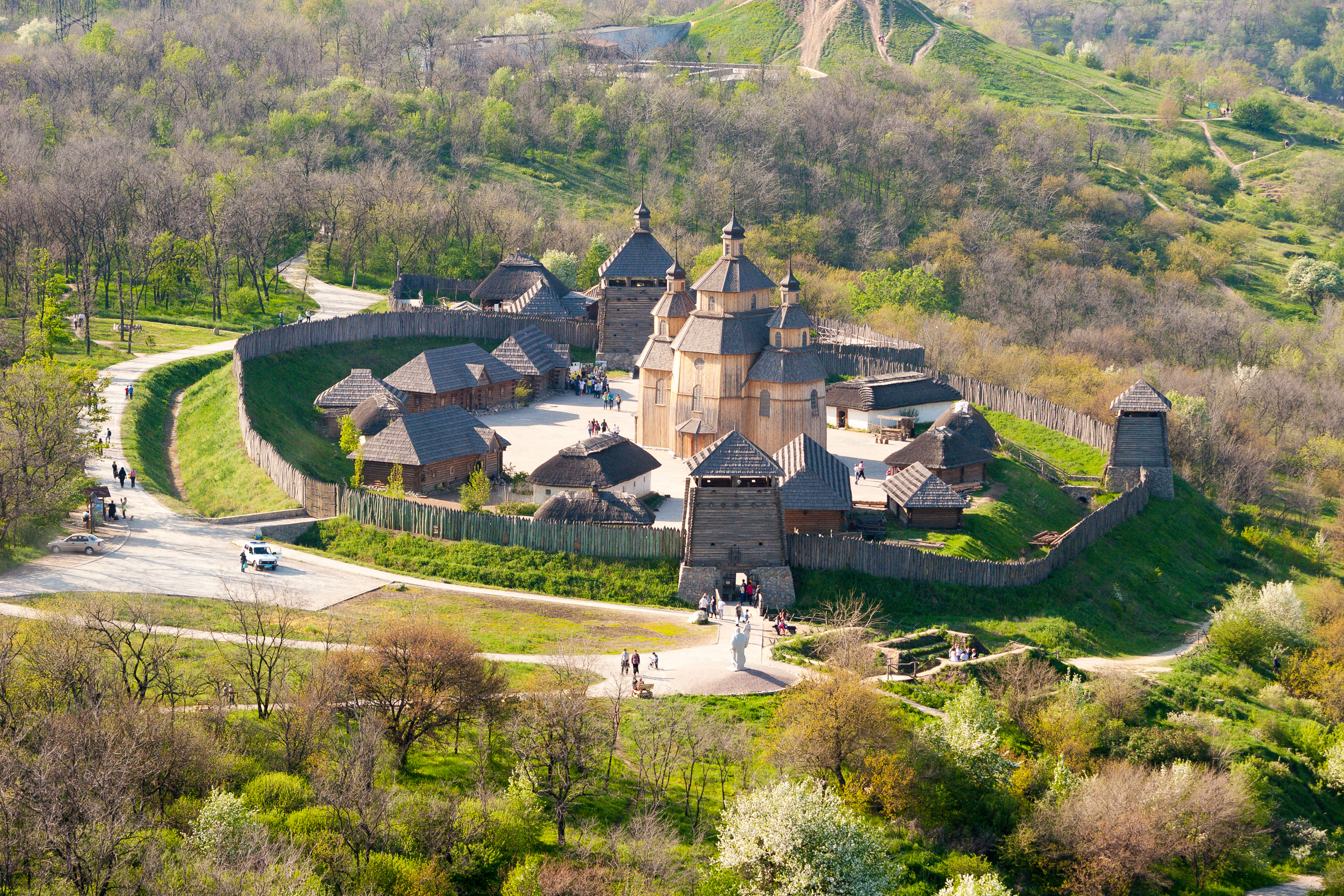
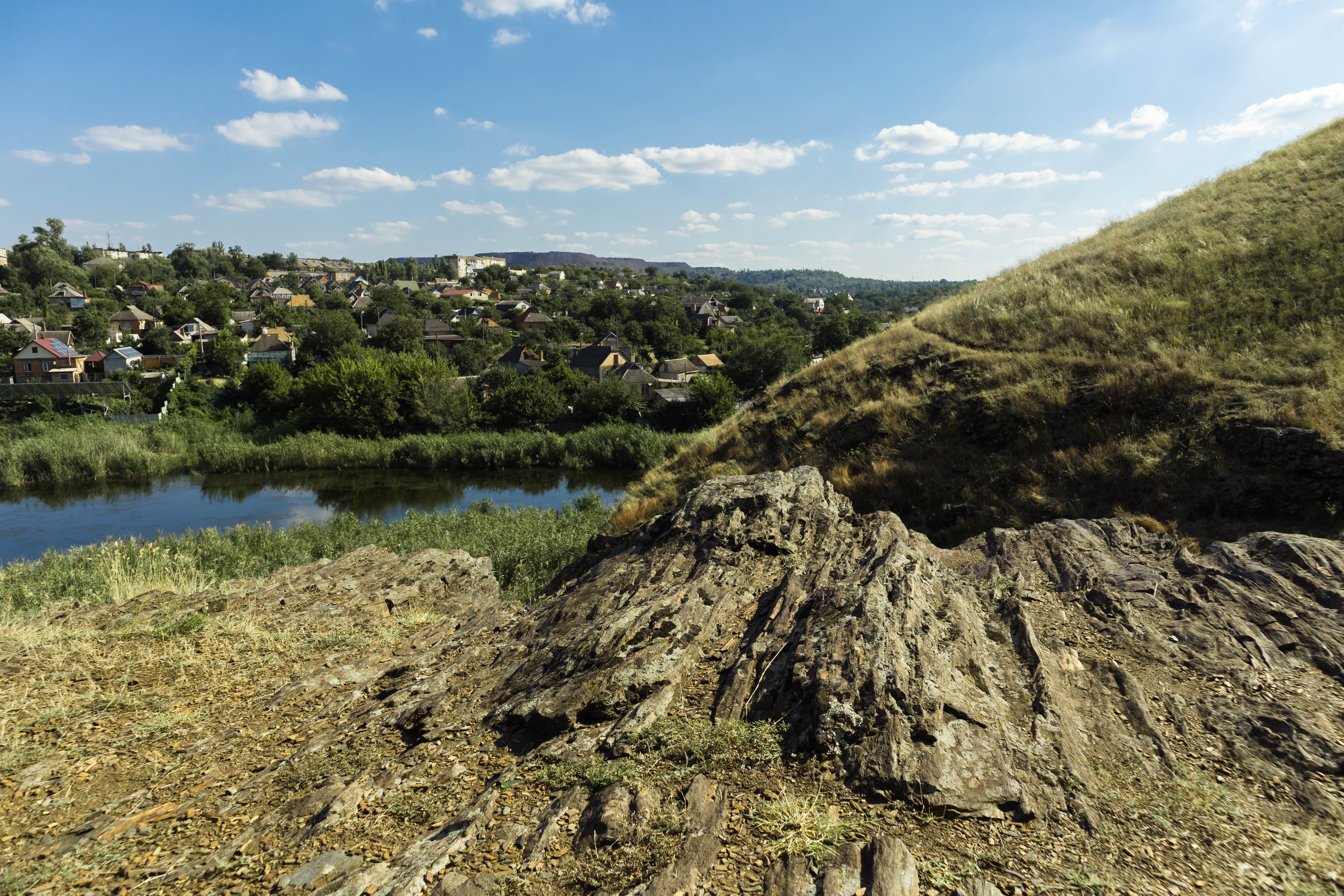
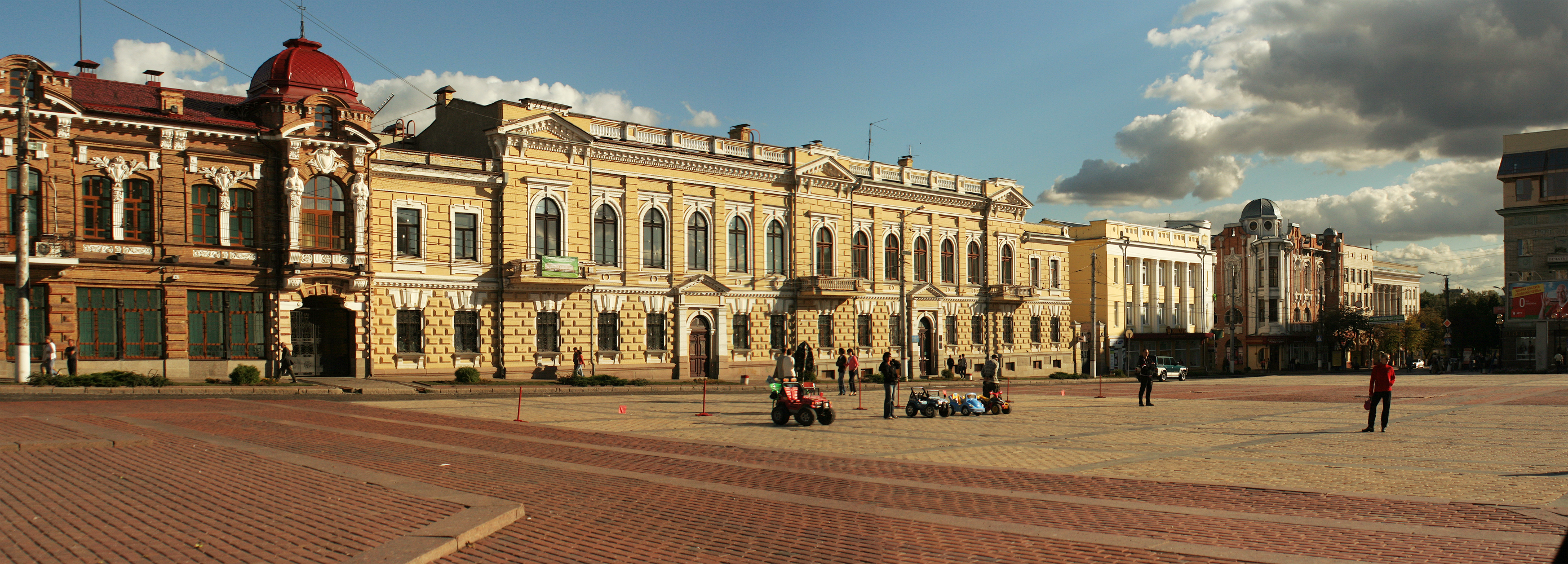
- Transfiguration Cathedral, Dnipro Oleksandriia Theater Khortytsia Island in Zaporizhzhia Rocks of MODR nature reserve Kropyvnytskyi town center

- Coat of arms
- Etymology: Beyond the Dnieper's rapids
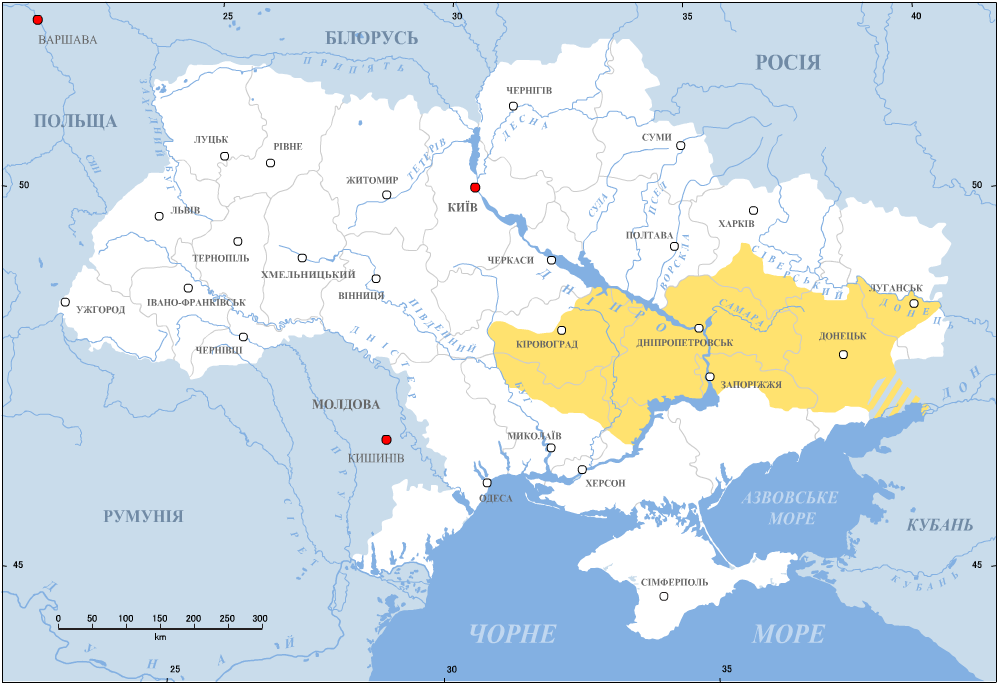
- Zaporizhzhia (yellow) in modern Ukraine
- Coordinates: 48.39°N 34.71°E
- Countries: Ukraine
- Regions: Eastern Ukraine; Southern Ukraine
- Capital: Zaporizhian Sich
- Largest city: Dnipro
- Parts: Dnipropetrovsk Oblast, Kirovohrad Oblast, Zaporizhzhia Oblast, Donetsk Oblast, Luhansk Oblast, Kherson Oblast, Mykolaiv Oblast, Rostov Oblast

Zaporizhzhia (Ukrainian: Запоріжжя, pronounced [zɐpoˈr⁽ʲ⁾iʒʲːɐ]) or Zaporozhzhia (Ukrainian: Запорожжя) is a historical region in south-central and eastern Ukraine below the Dnieper rapids (Ukrainian: Дніпрові пороги, romanized: Dniprovi porohy), hence the name, lit. "[territory] beyond the rapids".

From the 16th to the 18th centuries the Zaporizhzhia region functioned as semi-independent quasi-republican Cossack territory centred on the Zaporozhian Sich. Sometimes the region is referred to as Zaporozhian Sich as well. Zaporizhzhia corresponds to modern Dnipropetrovsk Oblast, major parts of Zaporizhzhia and Kirovohrad Oblasts, as well as parts of Kherson and Donetsk Oblasts of Ukraine.

== Names ==
The region was officially known as Free lands of the Lower Zaporizhzhia Host (Ukrainian: Вольності Війська Запорозького Низового, Polish: Zaporoże; Dzikie Pola (Wild Fields or Wild Plain), Russian: Запорoжье, romanized: Zaporož'je). Among other names, it was called as Wild Fields, Novorossiya (in Russia), and others.

== Origin ==
During the 1667 truce of Andrusovo, the region was under the condominium of both the Tsardom of Muscovy and the Kingdom of Poland, and in 1686, with the signing of the Treaty of Perpetual Peace, it passed under Russian suzerainty. In the 1750s, the Russian authorities sanctioned the establishment of New Serbia as a military frontier in the northwestern portion of the region, right on the border with the Polish–Lithuanian Commonwealth. Just before the Koliyivshchyna, the Russian authorities created Novorossiya Governorate, centered on Kremenchuk, which included territories of New Serbia, Slovianoserbia, and northern parts of the Zaporizhzhian region.

== History ==
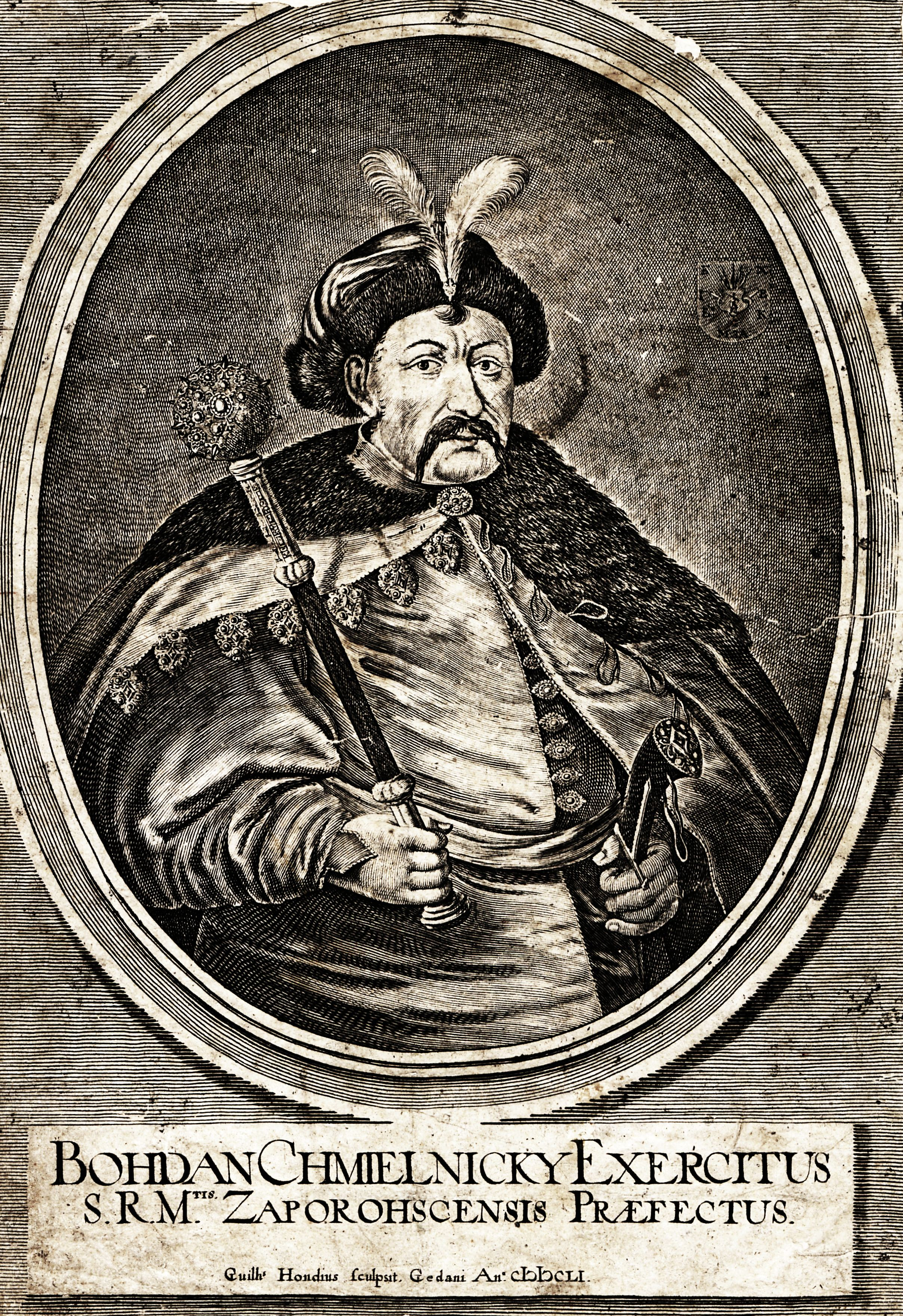
Bohdan Khmelnytsky as "Zaporohscensis Prefect" (1651)

Zaporizhzhia was the name of the territory of the Cossack state, the Zaporozhian Host, whose fortified capital was the Sich, usually located in the Great Meadow. From the 15th century to the late 17th century it was fought over by Muscovy, the Polish Kingdom and the Ottoman Empire, as well as by the Hetmans of Upper Ukraine (after 1648). For most of that time it was technically controlled by Poland, but it was rarely peaceful, and was widely regarded (from the perspective of the claimant governments) as turbulent and dangerous, the refuge of outlaws and bandits. In the eyes of the vast majority of the Ukrainian people, however, it was a promised land of heroes and free men (as later described in the poetry of Taras Shevchenko). In addition to many invasions by neighbouring countries, inhabitants of the Zaporozhe had to deal with an influx of new settlers from all directions and conflicts between the szlachta (Polish nobility) and independent Cossacks, who enjoyed a kind of autonomy in the region. Further, Cossacks often raided the nearby rich lands of the Ottoman Empire, retaliating for the constant slave raids of the Tatars against Ukrainian territories as far west as Galicia, in return provoking raids by Ottoman vassals, the Tatars.

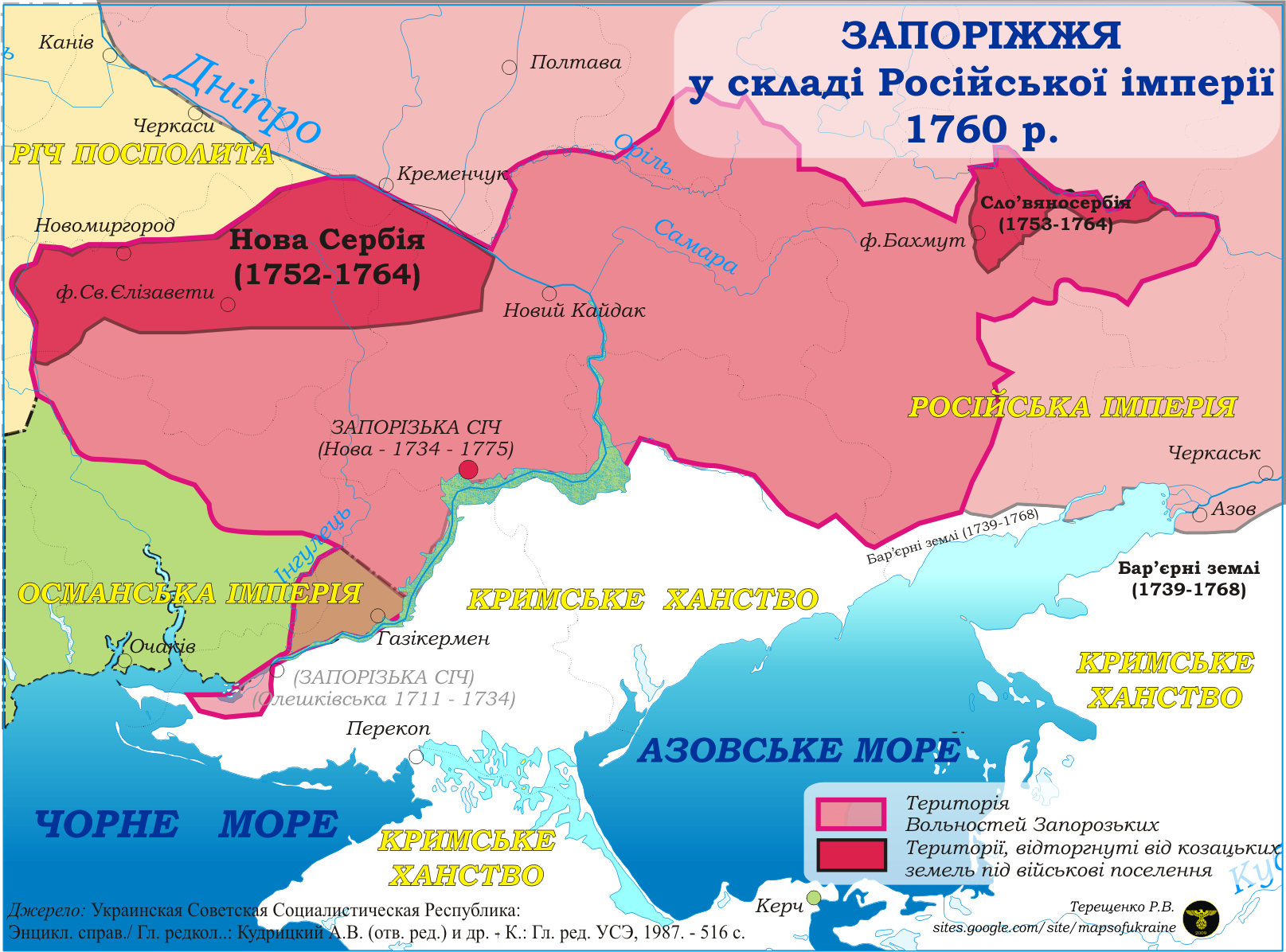
Zaporizhzhia in 1760

The more independent Army of Lower Zaporozhia was centered at the Old Sich (Stara Sich). In 1709, Tsar Peter I ordered the destruction of the Old Sich, forcing the Zaporozhian Cossacks to flee to the Oleshky Sich, on the Black Sea in the Crimean Khanate's territory. In 1734, the Russians allowed the Cossacks to re-establish their republic as the Free Lands of the Zaporozhian Host, based at the New Sich (Nova Sich), but brought in many foreign settlers, and destroyed the Sich for good in 1775, incorporating the territory into Novorossiya.

In the population Zaporizhzhia lands in the late 1770s to early 1780s after liquidation Zaporozhian Sich (1775) (uk) prevailed Ukrainians. In 1779, they accounted for 64.36% of the total population of this region. On the second the place among others ethnic group was occupied by the Greeks (13.76%), followed by Armenians (10.61%) and Russian (8.09%).

== Economy ==
Some historians estimate that an average peasant's hut did not last over 10 years. In the years 1605–1633, for example, Red Ruthenian lands suffered 100,000 people taken captive by the Ottomans, and 24,000 dead; in the first half of the 17th century, the Polish–Lithuanian Commonwealth, controlling Zaporizhzhia, lost approximately 300,000 of people due to the Ottoman raids.

== Legacy ==
The city of Zaporizhzhia was named after the region in 1921, and was previously known as Aleksandrovsk.

== Gallery ==
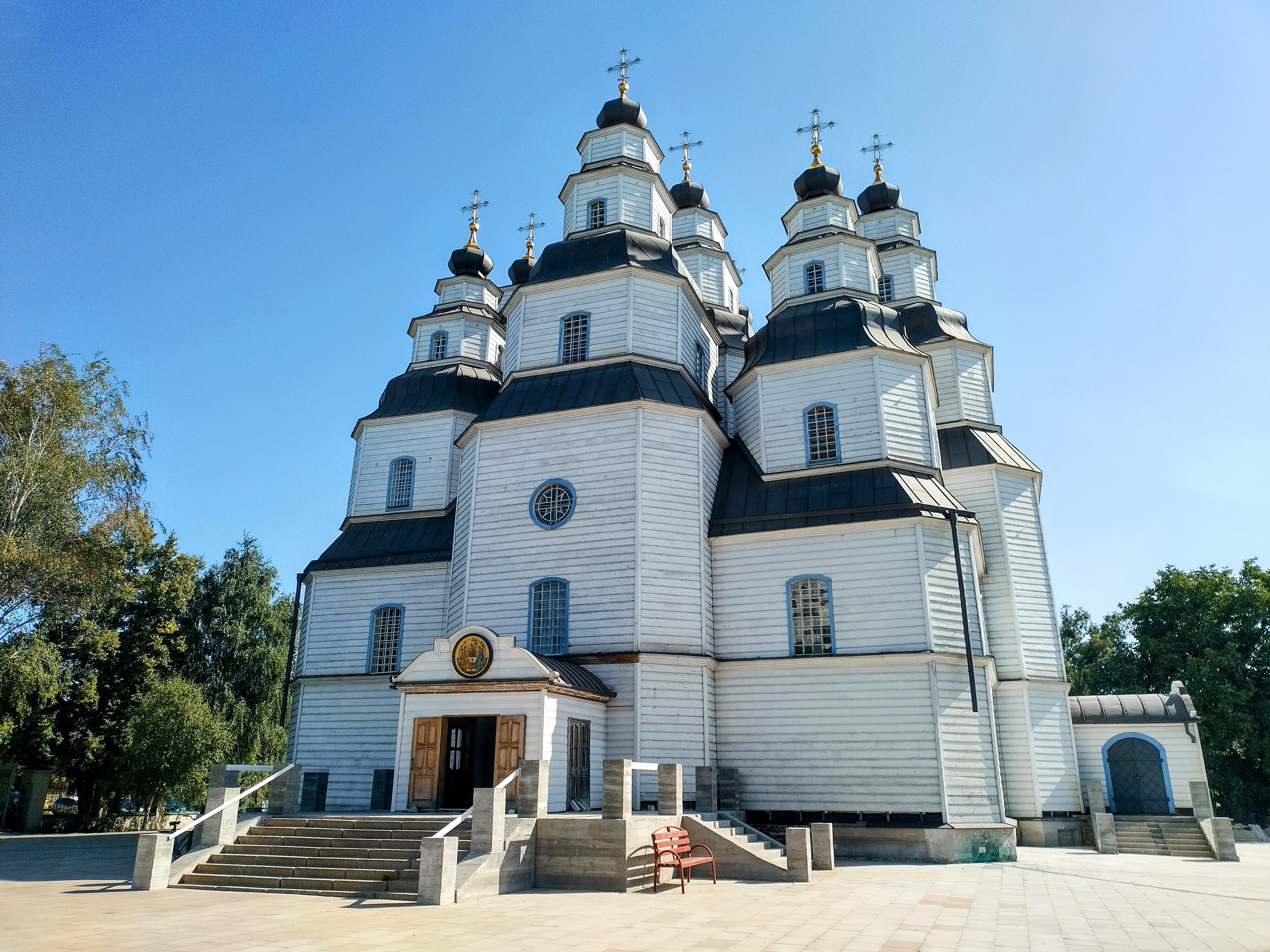
Trinity Cathedral, Samar

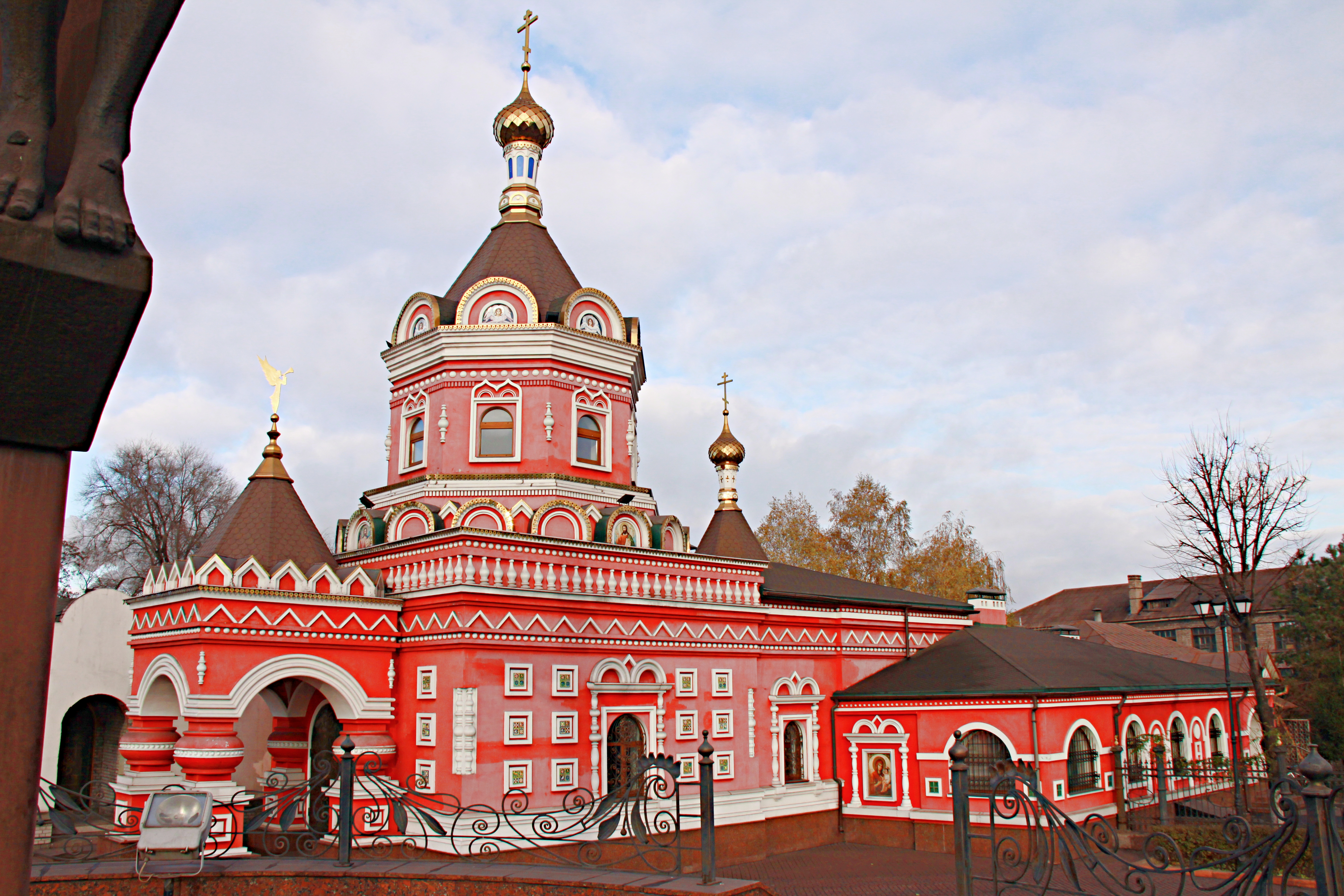
Saint Nicholas Church, Kamianske

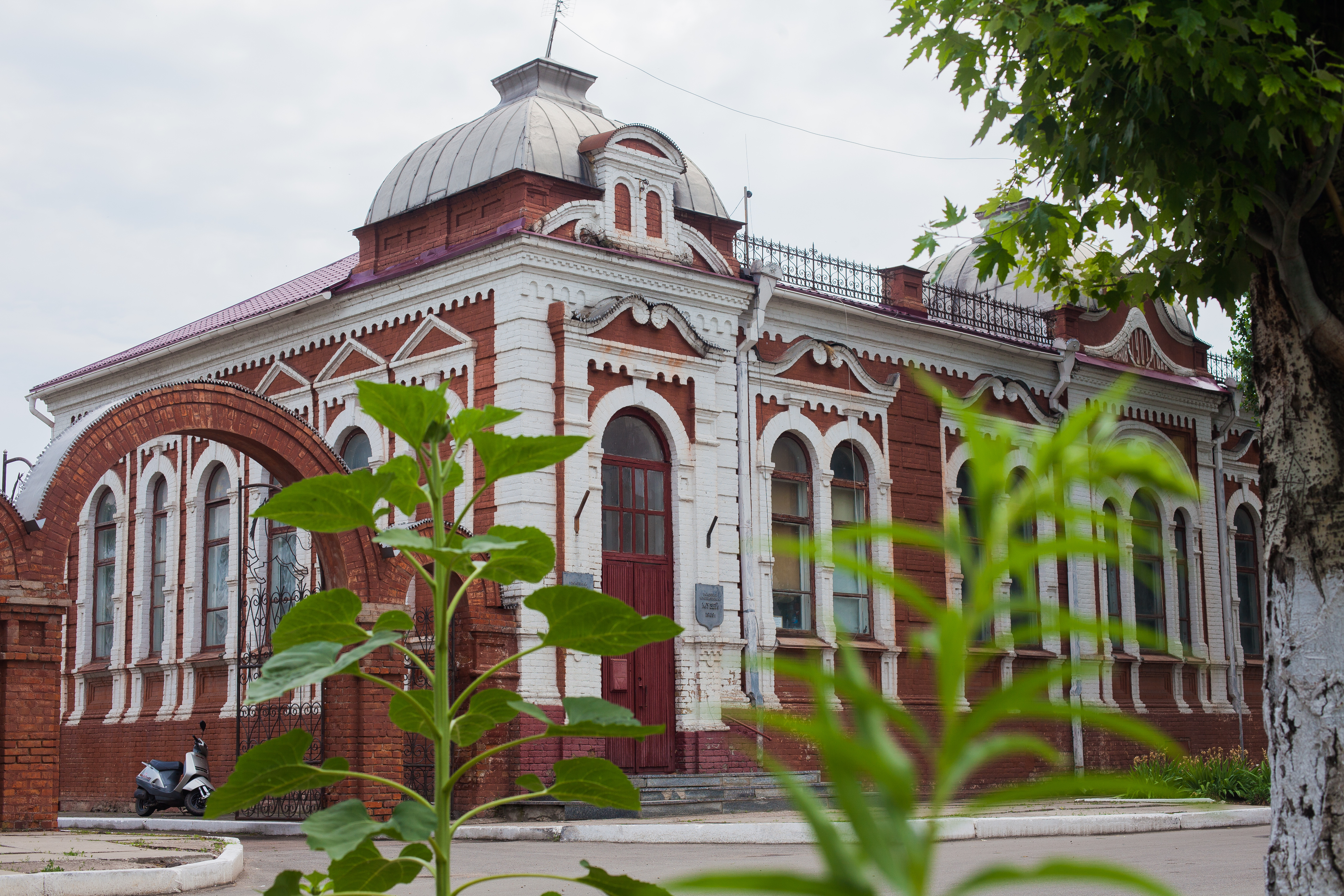
Local History Museum, Huliaipole

== See also ==
- Reply of the Zaporozhian Cossacks
- Polish–Lithuanian Commonwealth#Voivodships of Lesser Poland
- Dmytro Yavornytsky, historian of the Zaporozhian Cossacks.
- Cossack with musket
