= Coat of arms of Ukraine =

- Armiger: Ukraine
- Adopted: 19 February 1992
- Shield: Azure, a tryzub Or
- Earlier version
- Use: Ukrainian People's Republic (1918–1921)

The coat of arms of Ukraine is a blue shield with a golden trident. It is colloquially known as the tryzub (Ukrainian: тризуб, pronounced [trɪˈzub], lit. 'trident').

The small coat of arms was officially adopted on 19 February 1992, while constitutional provisions exist for establishing the great coat of arms, which is not yet officially adopted as of October 2026. The small coat of arms was designed by Andriy Grechylo, Oleksii Kokhan, and Ivan Turetskyi. It appears on the presidential standard. Blue-coloured tridents are considered to be an irregular representation by the Ukrainian Heraldry Society. The greater coat of arms which has not been adopted consists of the small coat of arms and the coat of arms of the Zaporizhian Host (Constitution of Ukraine, Article 20).

The trident was not thought of as a national symbol until 1917, when one of the most prominent Ukrainian historians, Mykhailo Hrushevskyi, proposed to adopt it as a national symbol (alongside other variants, including an arbalest, a bow or a cossack carrying a musket, i.e. images that carried considerable historical and cultural and heraldic significance for Ukraine). On 25 February 1918, the Central Rada (parliament) adopted it as the coat of arms of the short-lived Ukrainian People's Republic.

During the Soviet period of 1919–1991 and independence between 1991 and 1992, the state symbols were consistent with those of the Russian SFSR and the Soviet Union – a hammer and sickle over the rising sun.

== Description ==
(left) Seal of Sviatoslav the Brave, 945; (middle) Coin of Volodymyr the Great, 980; (right) Coin of Yaroslav the Wise, 1019

The modern "trident" symbol was adopted as the coat of arms of the Ukrainian People's Republic in February 1918, designed by the Ukrainian artist and designer Vasyl Krychevsky. The design has precedents in the seals of Kievan Rus'. The first known archaeological and historical evidence of this symbol can be found on the seals of the Rurik dynasty. However, according to Pritsak, the stylized trident tamga, or seal, which was used by rulers such as Sviatoslav I and similar tamgas that were found in ruins are Khazar in origin.

It was stamped on the gold and silver coins issued by Vladimir the Great (r. 980–1015), also known as Volodymyr, who might have inherited the symbol from his ancestors (such as Sviatoslav I) as a dynastic coat of arms, and he passed it on to his sons, Sviatopolk I (1015–1019) and Yaroslav the Wise (1019–1054). The symbol was also found on the bricks of the Church of the Tithes in Kyiv, the tiles of the Dormition Cathedral in Volodymyr, and the stones of other churches, castles, and palaces. There are many examples of it used on ceramics, weapons, rings, medallions, seals, and manuscripts.

An emblem used in early 1918

The coat of arms of the Ukrainian People's Republic (1918)

The Greater coat of arms of the Ukrainian People's Republic (1918)

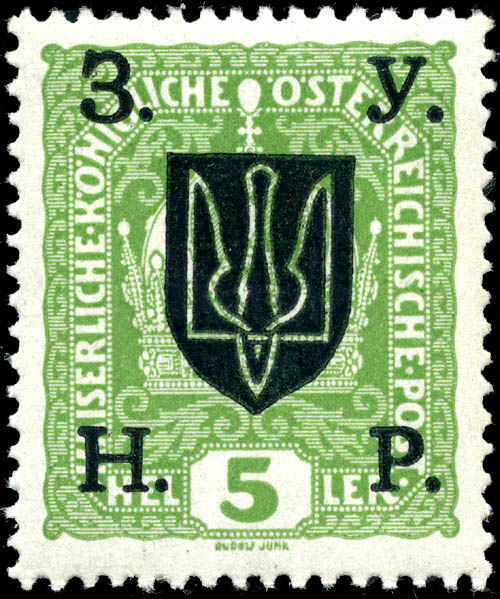
The Ukrainian trident overprint of May 1919 on a five-heller stamp of Austria-Hungary

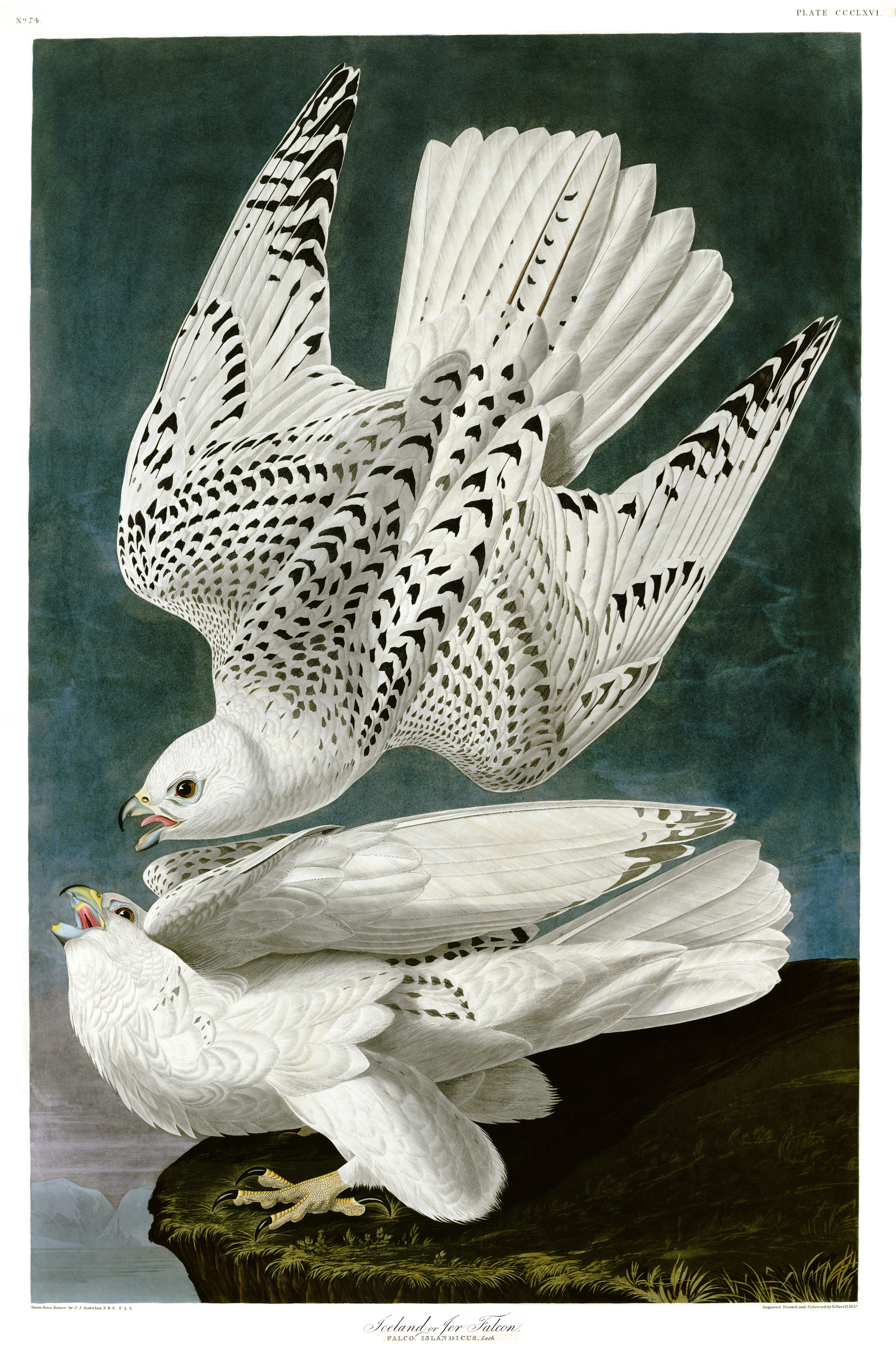
The gyrfalcon, possibly the inspiration for the trident

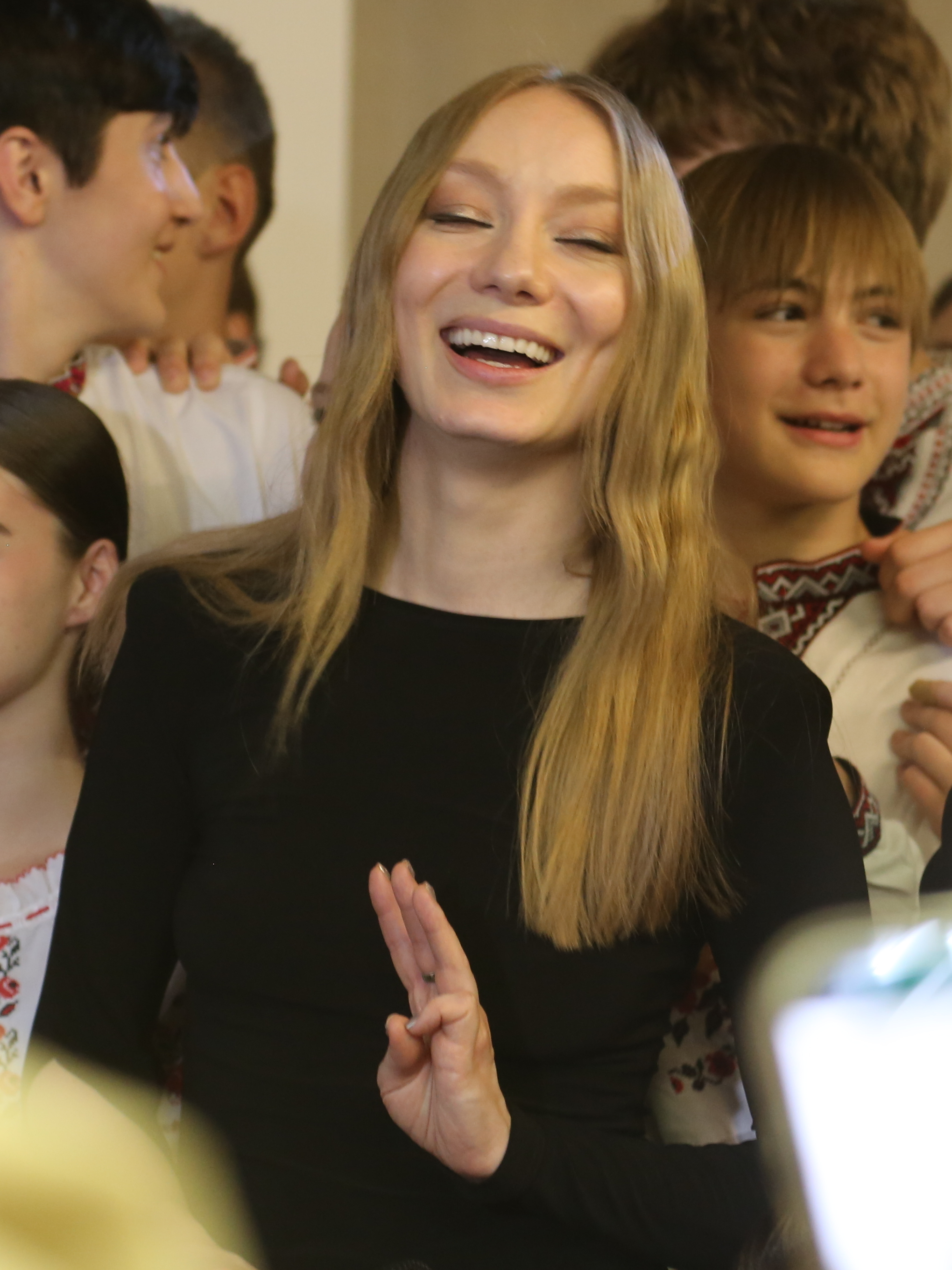
Viktoria Leléka demonstrates the three-fingered tryzub gesture

Historians have multiple interpretations of the origin of the symbol, including a falcon, an arched bow, the Holy Trinity, or an anchor. Depictions of a flying falcon with a Christian cross above its head have been found in Old Ladoga, the first seat of the Kievan Rurikids, of Scandinavian lineage. Such a falcon, along with a cross, are also featured on the coins of Olaf Guthfrithsson, a Viking king of Dublin and Northumbria.

Falconry has been a royal sport in Europe for centuries. The gyrfalcon (known also as the Norwegian falcon) was considered a royal bird and is mentioned (Ukrainian: рарог, romanized: raroh) in one of the earliest epics of Ruthenia, the 12th-century poem "The Tale of Igor's Campaign".

Later images of the trident ("tryzub") among the Rurikids resemble more a bident or the letter "У", which also in the modern Cyrillic alphabet denotes the sound "u" as in "Ukraine" (though the Cyrillic alphabet at the time did not use this letter individually, using the digraph ОУ/ОѴ or its monogram Ꙋ instead).

Color standardisation scheme	Deep blue	Yellow
Pantone	Pantone Coated 2935 C	Pantone Coated Yellow 012 C
Lab	34.02, −2.19, −64.19	85.29, 5.18, 109.8
RAL	5005	1023 Traffic yellow
RGB	0, 87, 184	255, 215, 0
CMYK	100, 71, 0, 0	2, 12, 100, 0
HEX	#0057b8	#ffd700
Websafe	#0066cc	#ffcc00

The Tryzub is used in military heraldry to commemorate participation on the Eastern Front during World War II. Over 36 units of the Italian Army carry the Tryzub in their coat of arms, as they were awarded a Medal for Military Valor during their service on the territory of Ukraine. The Tryzub is the coat of arms of the town of Zaslawye in Belarus. In the early 20th century, the Tryzub was used in conjunction with the tricolor flag of Russia as the symbol of the National Alliance of Russian Solidarists.

A three-fingered hand salute is sometimes used to mimic the Tryzub; as for example in pro-independence demonstrations in the late 1980s and in the logo of the (Ukrainian) Svoboda party.

== History ==
=== Kingdom of Galicia–Volhynia ===
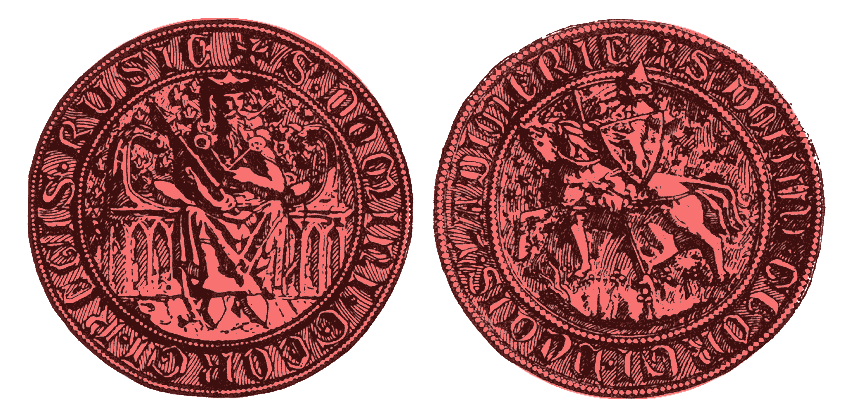
The seal of King George-Boleslav denoting a horse rider with a lion on the coat of arms

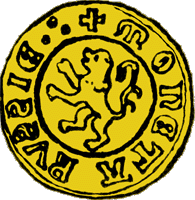
Coin of Galicia after the Polish annexation (Moneta Russie)

The coat of arms for the Principality of Galicia–Volhynia, later the Kingdom of Galicia–Volhynia, also known as the Kingdom of Ruthenia, has existed since the 12th century. It consisted of a lion on an azure heater shield. The Ruthenian lion first appears in the seal of the Ruthenian king Yurii I, dated to the beginning of the XIV century. There is an image of a monarch on a throne, and on the reverse, an armed horseman holding a shield with a lion on his hind leg, an example of equestrian seals common in Europe at the time. On the seal, there is an inscription in Latin: "Sigillum Domini Georgi Regis Rusie" (Seal of the owner of George-Yuri, King of Ruthenia), on the back: "Sigillum Domini Georgi Ducis Ladimerie" (seal of the owner of George-Yuri, prince of Lodomeria).

On the seal of his son Lev II, only a lion without a rider is depicted. The animal stands on its hind legs and reverses to the left.

Figures of lions as symbols of Ruthenia are found on the silver coins of the Lithuanian prince Lubart, the last ruler of the Kingdom of Ruthenia (1340–1383), and his son Fedor (1384–1387). We see the same motive on Ruthenian money, the issue of which continued during the reign in Ruthenia of the Polish king Casimir III (1349–1370), the Hungarian king Louis (1370–1372, 1378–1382) and his governor, Prince of Opole Vladislav (1372–1378).

After the occupation of Eastern Galicia by the Kingdom of Poland as a result of the Galicia–Volhynia Wars, the coat of arms with many changes was adopted as part of the Ruthenian Voivodeship (Latin: Palatinatus russiae, Ruthenian Palatine). It was abandoned with partition of Poland and annexation of territory by the Austrian Empire. At the end of World War I and dissolution of Austria-Hungary, the Western Ukrainian People's Republic revived the coat of arms. With the annexation of the West Ukraine by Poland again in 1918 and later the Soviet Union, the gold lion symbol became the coat of arms for the city of Lviv.

Kingdom of Ruthenia coats of arms
Kingdom of Rus	Ruthenian Voivodeship	West Ukrainian People's Republic	Lviv Oblast

=== Cossack Hetmanate ===
Coat of arms of (left) the Zaporizhian Host (Cossack Hetmanate); (right) Sketch by Heorhiy Narbut for the Ukrainian State (1918)

A Cossack with a musket was an emblem of the Zaporizhian Host and later the state emblem of the Hetmanate and the Ukrainian State. The origin of the emblem is uncertain, while its first records date back to 1592. On the initiative of Pyotr Rumyantsev, the emblem was phased out and replaced by the Russian double-headed eagle in 1767. A Cossack with a rifle was restored by the Hetman of Ukraine Pavlo Skoropadsky in 1918. The emblem disappeared until in 2005, when it reappeared on the proposed Great Seal of Ukraine.

==== Designs by Heorhiy Narbut ====
Designs of the coat of arms of Ukraine by Heorhiy Narbut are projects of the State Coat of Arms of the Ukrainian State and the Great Coat of Arms of the Ukrainian State developed by the Ukrainian artist Heorhiy Narbut in 1918. Heorhiy Narbut took as a basis the national symbols of the hetman state of the Zaporizhzhia Army. On an octagonal blue shield, a Cossack dressed in gold ornamented robes was placed in the center. Above the Cossack's shield rose a golden trident, the sign of Grand Duke Volodymyr. The Cossack was turned to the right, and around his shield was a silver cantush, painted in a floral baroque style. The trident gained popularity in the Ukrainian People's Republic, because it was depicted on the karbovanets coins introduced in December 1917. The first coin of the Ukrainian People's Republic was 100 karbovanets. George Narbut used baroque elements and heraldic signs - the trident and coat of arms of the Kyiv Magistrate of the times of the Grand Duchy of Lithuania in the form of a crossbow. So the trident became a popular symbol and eventually turned into a small coat of arms of the Ukrainian People's Republic. Since January 22, 1919, the Trident was also used as the coat of arms of the Western region of the Ukrainian People's Republic. It remained the coat of arms of the hetman state of Pavlo Skoropadskyi, as well as the Directorate of Ukraine.

=== Grand Duchy of Ruthenia (Archistrategos Mykhaïl) ===
The importance of the Kyiv region coat of arms with Archangel Michael known as Archistrategos Mykhaïl arose during discussion of the so-called 1658 treaty of Hadiach between the delegation of the Cossack Hetmanate and the Crown of Poland, that foresaw the transformation of the Commonwealth into the Polish–Lithuanian–Ruthenian Commonwealth. The coat of arms with Archangel Michael is often confused with symbol of the Kyiv City. Note that before the Muscovite annexation of Ukrainian lands in 18th century (see "partitions of Poland"), the city had another symbol which was included by Mykhailo Hrushevsky in his proposal of the Ukrainian coat of arms.

Ruthenia, Polish–Lithuanian Commonwealth, Cossack Hetmanate, Russian Empire, Ukraine
Coat of arms of Kyiv Land	Coat of arms of Kijów Voivodeship	Coat of arms of Kyiv Regiment	Coat of arms of Kiev Governorate	Coat of arms of Kyiv City

Proposed / Drafts
		Link to file	
Coat of arms of the January Uprising	Bytynskyi's coat of arms of Ukraine	Kokhan's coat of arms of Ukraine	Lypynsky's coat of arms (1917)

=== Carpathian Ruthenia (Red bear) ===
The coat of arms was created after the end of the First World War, when Carpathian Ruthenia (then called Subcarpathian Rus') was transferred from Hungary to the newly created state of Czechoslovakia. It was designed in 1920 by Czech historian Gustav Friedrich. The Ruthenians had been promised autonomy within the new country, and therefore a coat of arms was created for their land.

Carpathian Ruthenia
Greater coat of arms of Czechoslovakia	Coat of arms of Carpatho-Ukraine	Coat of arms of the current Zakarpattia Oblast

The coat of arms shows the Ukrainian tinctures (heraldic colours) of blue and gold in its first (dexter) field and a red bear on silver in its second field. The bear is perhaps a symbol of Carpathian wildlife. The horizontal lines (in heraldry called bars) could perhaps have been inspired by the partitions per fess in the coat of arms of Hungary, to which the territory had belonged.

The arms were also used by the short-lived state of Carpatho-Ukraine in 1939, but with the addition of the Ukrainian Tryzub in the uppermost blue field, used previously by the Ukrainian People's Republic. Since the territory is the same for the current Zakarpattia Oblast, the oblast uses the arms as its own minus the trident.

=== Ukrainian Soviet Socialist Republic ===
The coat of arms of the Ukrainian Soviet Socialist Republic was adopted on 14 March 1919 by the government of the Ukrainian Soviet Socialist Republic. It was modified on 7 November 1928, 30 January 1937, and 21 November 1949. The 1949 coat of arms is based on the coat of arms of the Soviet Union and features the hammer and sickle with a sunrise on a baroque-styled shield crowned with the red star, and having ears of wheat on its outer rims.

The banner bears the Soviet Union state motto ("Workers of the world, unite!") in both the Ukrainian and Russian languages or Ukrainian only on some editions of the emblem. The name of the union republic was shown as a Russian acronym on the first emblem edition, on the next two editions as a Ukrainian acronym, while the latest edition contained the actual word "Ukrainian". The latest edition of the emblem was the one crowned with the red star which was not featured on previous editions.

After independence on 24 August 1991, Ukraine retained the Soviet emblem. The next year, in 1992, the emblem was changed to the present coat of arms of Ukraine, the tryzub (trident) coat of arms.

Emblem of the Ukrainian Soviet Socialist Republic
1919–1929	1929–1937	1937–1949	1949–1992

=== Other variations ===
Among other notable features are Archistratege Michael the Archangel, Pohoń Ruśka (Ruthenian Pursuer), Three crowns (representing three kings Daniel, Leo and George), Galician jackdaw, Volhynian silver cross pattée at the red field, Podolian gold sun, Chernihiv black eagle, Kharkiv crossed cornucopia and caduceus at the green field, Okhtyrka golden cross trefly on at the blue field.

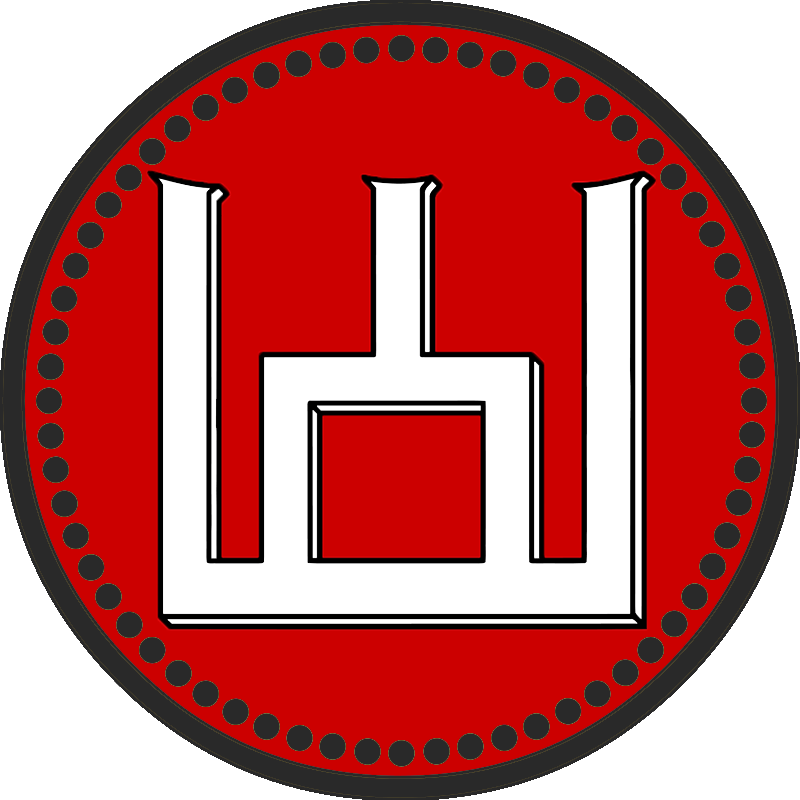
Columns of Gediminas

Sich Riflemen emblem on the cockade

OUN tryzub designed by Robert Lisovskyi

14th Waffen Grenadier Division of the SS (1st Ukrainian) with a lion and three crowns

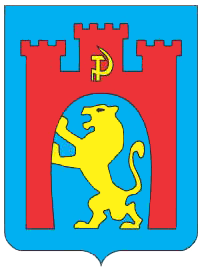
City of Lviv in the Soviet Union (1967–1990)

Variation of Pogon Ruska for the city of Kamianets-Podilskyi in (1374–1796) until occupation of Podolia by Russian Empire

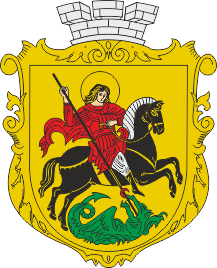
Variation of Pogon Ruska for the city of Nizhyn

Variation of Galician jackdaw with three crowns

== Greater coat of arms ==
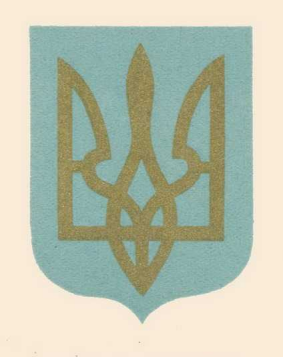
Mykola Bytynskyi's proposal

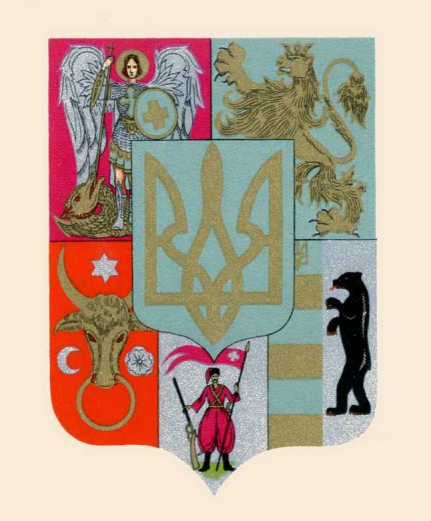
Mykola Bytynskyi's proposal

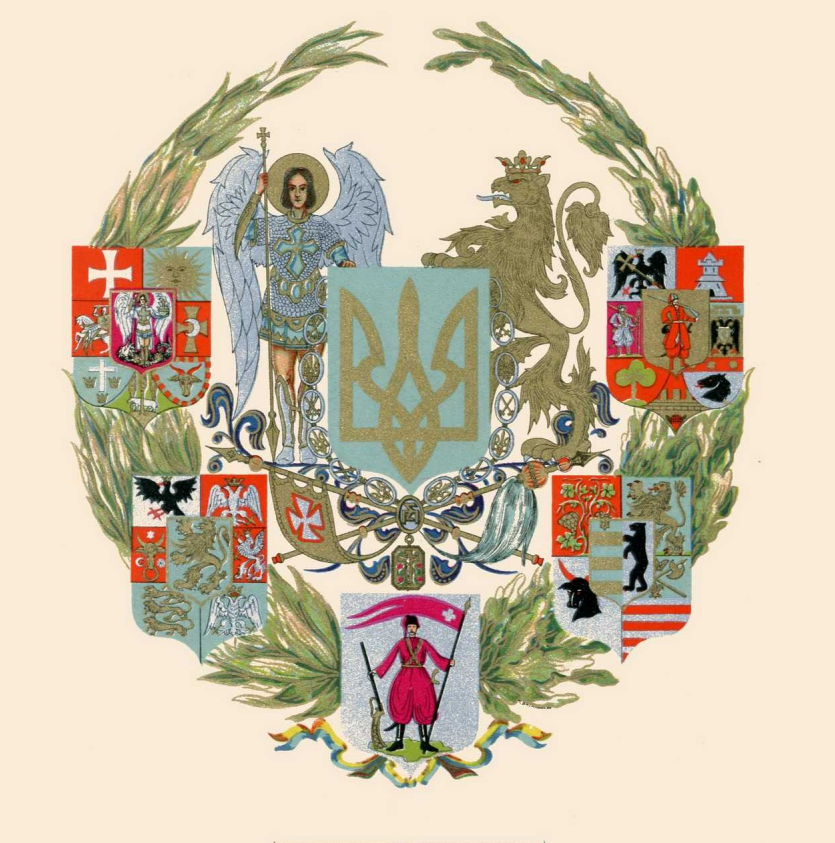
Mykola Bytynskyi's proposal

Mykhailo Hrushevskyi's proposal

1996 proposal

In 1917, President of the Central Rada Mykhailo Hrushevsky proposed the Great Coat of Arms in the form of a single shield topped by a dove with olive branch. The shield was split five ways. At its center there was a smaller shield depicting a plough as a symbol of productive peaceful work surrounded by ancient state symbols of Ukraine: the princely arms of Vladimir the Great or Volodymyr the Great (tryzub), Litvin Pogon with a golden lion, cossack with musket, the crossbow of Kyiv and the lion of Lviv.

In the current Constitution of Ukraine there is a constitutional provisions for the establishment of a Great Coat of Arms of Ukraine, although it was never officially adopted and was published in various heraldic sources. In this variant, the shield is supported by a lion from the Galician Coat of Arms on the left and a cossack in traditional dress, wielding a musket, the symbol of the Cossack Hetmanate on the right. The Coat of Arms is crowned with the crown of Volodymyr the Great, symbolizing Ukrainian sovereignty and decorated with viburnum and wheat at the bottom.

Since Ukrainian independence in 1991 four attempts by the Ukrainian government to create an official Great Coat of Arms have failed. The official adoption of the Great Coat of Arms has to be endorsed (in a second reading) by a two-thirds majority vote (300 votes) in the Verkhovna Rada, the Ukrainian parliament.

On 25 August 2020 the Verkhovna Rada instructed the Shmyhal Government to get an official Great Coat of Arms of Ukraine adopted in time for the 30th anniversary of Ukrainian independence. On the day of the 30th anniversary of Ukrainian independence, 24 August 2021, the Verkhovna Rada adopted a law in its first reading that establishes an official Great Coat of Arms of Ukraine with 257 votes.

== See also ==
- Armorial of Ukraine
- Columns of Gediminas
- Flag of Ukraine
- National symbols of Ukraine
- Symbols of the Rurikids
- Trident
  - Trishula
  - Trident of Poseidon

== Sources ==
- Pritsak, Omeljan (1998). The Origins of the Old Rus' Weights and Monetary Systems. Cambridge, Massachusetts: Harvard Ukrainian Research Institute. ISBN 0-916458-48-2.
- Zhukovsky, Arkadii (1993). "Trident (tryzub)". Encyclopedia of Ukraine. Vol. 5.
