= National symbols of Ukraine =

The national symbols of Ukraine include a variety of official and unofficial symbols and other items that are used in Ukraine to represent what is unique about the nation, reflecting different aspects of its cultural life and history.

== Symbols ==
Type	Symbol	Image	Notes
Flag	Flag of Ukraine	National Flag of Ukraine	Official
Coat of arms	Coat of arms of Ukraine	Emblem of Ukraine	Official. The lone emblem featured on it is the tryzub (meaning "trident"), a state sigil of the Kyivan Rus from the 10th century A.D., believed to originally represent the Holy Trinity, possibly adapted from symbolism of a falcon.
Flag with coat of arms	Flag with coat of arms of Ukraine	Flag of Ukraine with coat of arms	Unofficial
National anthem	"Shche ne vmerla Ukrainy" ('The glory and will of Ukraine has not yet perished')		Official
Greeting	Glory to Ukraine!	Слава Україні! (Slava Ukrayini!)	Official (used by the Ukrainian Armed Forces and the Ukrainian National Police)
National colours		Blue #005BBB Yellow #FFD700	Official
National founder and patron	Sviatoslav The Brave		Official
National dress	Vyshyvanka		Official
National poet and artist	Taras Shevchenko	Shevchenko in 1840	Official. Lived from 1814 to 1861.
Musical instrument	Bandura	Bandura	Official
National dish	Borscht		Official
National personification	Cossack Mamay	Cossack Mamay	Official
National sport	Association football	Andriy Shevchenko celebrates goal at the Euro2012 match against Sweden	
National bird	Common nightingale		Official
National dance	Hopak	Hopak by Military Ukrainian Dance Ensemble	Official
National drink	Horilka		Official
National plant	Kalyna		Official
National flower	Sunflower		
