= Columns of Gediminas =

Oldest national symbol of Lithuania

Columns of Gediminas Gediminids' Pillars
- Armiger: Grand Duchy of Lithuania, Republic of Lithuania, Sąjūdis
- Adopted: It is certain that since 1397, the Gediminids' Pillars were Vytautas the Great's coat of arms.

The Columns of Gediminas or Pillars of Gediminas (Lithuanian: Gediminaičių stulpai, lit. 'Pillars of the Gediminids') are one of the earliest symbols of Lithuania and its historical coats of arms. They were used in the Grand Duchy of Lithuania, initially as a rulers' personal insignia, a state symbol, and later as a part of heraldic signs of leading aristocracy.

== Appearance ==
The symbol appears in the following form: Horizontal line at bottom, vertical lines extend up at both ends. The square at the middle of the horizontal line is about half as tall as the vertical lines. Another vertical line rises from the top center of the square, giving an overall appearance that is close to a trident. This form is the one usually seen in modern times, often drawn on walls and fences as protest against the Soviet occupation of Lithuania.

It is notable that the ancient pre-Christian symbols of Lithuania did not follow the same strict rules of heraldry as their Western counterparts. Thus this symbol was used in or and argent, usually on the field gules, and was depicted in various shapes on flags, banners and shields.

Some Belarusian historians claim that the Columns directly go back to the symbol of the Rurikids, which was the trident.

== Name ==
The name "Columns of Gediminas" was given in the 19th century by historian Teodor Narbutt, who supposed that the symbol was Gediminas' insignia. The more exact name of the symbol is the Pillars of Gediminids, since there is no direct evidence of its connection with Grand Duke of Lithuania Gediminas.

== History ==
=== In the Grand Duchy of Lithuania ===
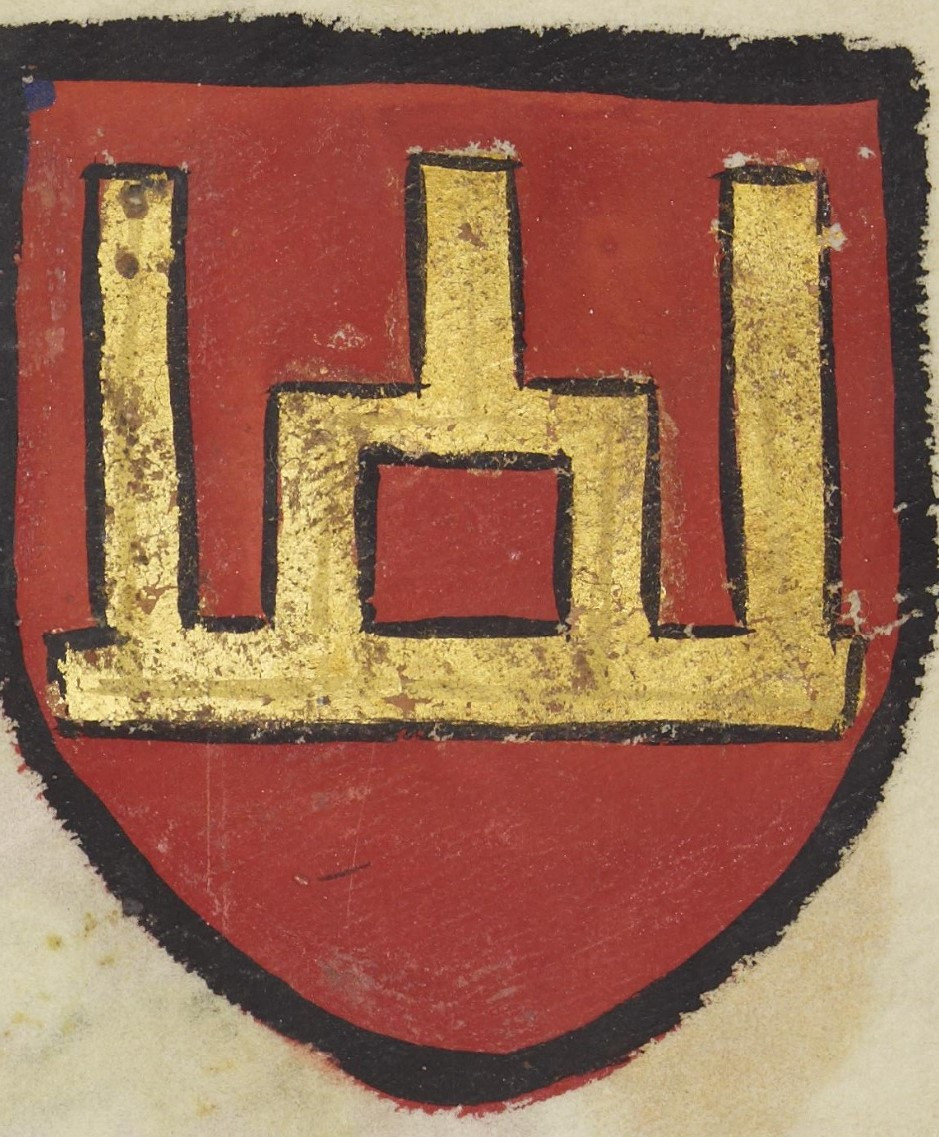
Columns of Gediminas as drawn in an armorial by a Portuguese herald in the Council of Constance in 1416

According to the historical and archaeological evidence, the Columns were used by Grand Duke of Lithuania and Duke of Trakai Kęstutis. They appear on the Lithuanian coins issued by him. The symbol was also used by Vytautas as his personal insignia since 1397 and appeared on his seal and coins. It was suggested by historian Edmundas Antanas Rimša, who analyzed the ancient coins, that the Columns of the Gediminids symbolizes the Gates of the Trakai Peninsula Castle. According to the accounts of Jan Długosz, it was derived from a symbol or brand used to mark horses and other property. The Columns were adopted by descendants of Kęstutis as their family symbol, equivalent to a coat of arms. Another user of the Columns of Gediminas was Grand Duke of Lithuania Sigismund Kęstutaitis. At first, the Columns signified the family of Kęstutis, in contrast to the Vytis which was used by Algirdas' descendants. Later on, as a symbol of a ruling dynasty, it was adopted by Jagiellons and the two symbols became state symbols of the Grand Duchy of Lithuania and the Columns of Gediminas remained in use over the following centuries.

=== In the Interwar Republic of Lithuania ===
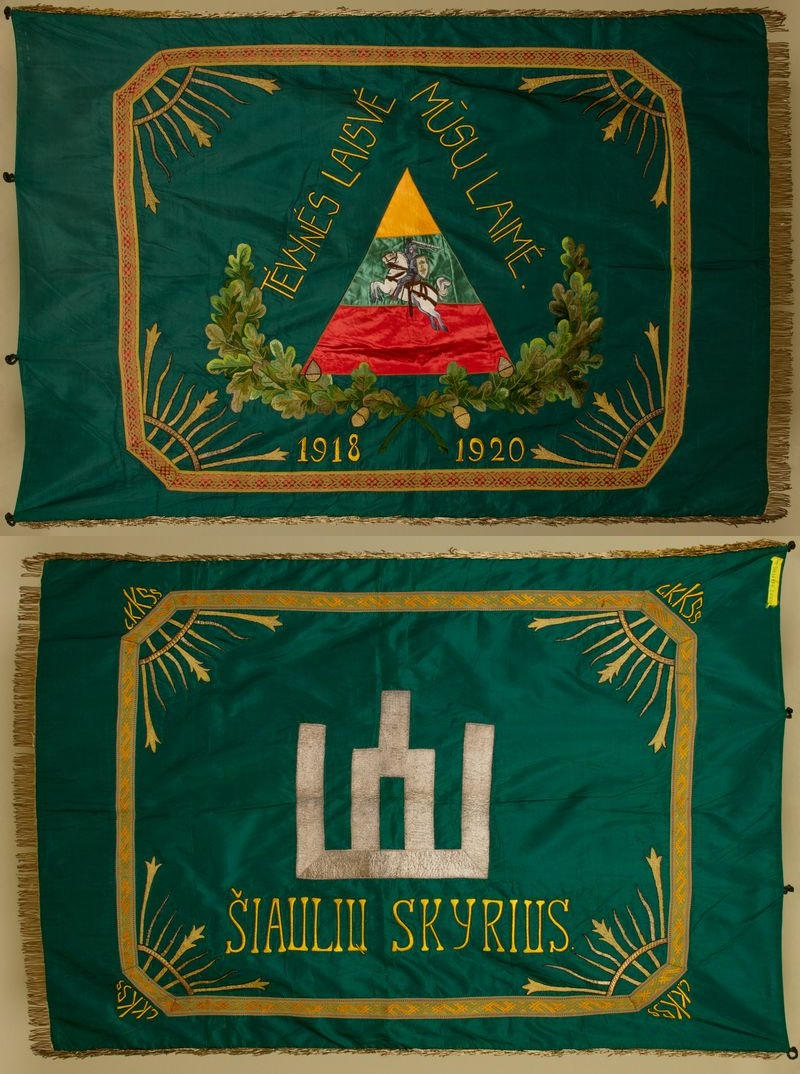
Flag of the Šiauliai branch of the Lithuanian Armed Forces Creators Volunteers Union (1918–1920).

During the period between World War I and World War II they were used by the Lithuanian Republic as a major state symbol, e. g. on Litas coins, monuments and military equipment. The Columns of Gediminas are featured on the Lithuanian Presidential Award Order of the Lithuanian Grand Duke Gediminas, which was started in 1928.

=== In the Soviet Union ===
After the annexation of Lithuania by the Soviet Union, the symbol was officially banned. During the Singing Revolution of the late 80s, it became the iconic sign of the reform movement Sąjūdis.

== Modern usage in Lithuania ==
Coat of arms of the Seimas of Lithuania

The Columns of Gediminas appears in the coat of arms of Seimas and in the emblems of the Lithuanian Armed Forces, Land Force, Air Force, Navy, Military Police, National Defence Volunteer Forces and Grand Duke Gediminas Staff Battalion. The Columns of Gediminas are also featured in the coat of arms of Old Trakai, Trakai District Municipality and Šimkaičiai. The Columns of Gediminas is used by various Lithuanian sports teams such as BC Rytas and FK Žalgiris as well as the Lithuanian National Olympic Committee. The symbol is also added on to many monuments throughout the country. The official logo of the EuroBasket 2011, which took place in Lithuania, is composed of the Columns overlaid on a basketball board.

The Columns of Gediminas with post horn are also the official logo of the Lithuanian postal company — Lietuvos paštas. The company uses the columns on its official stamps.

A combination of the Columns of Gediminas and the Menorah are used by the Litvak community as a symbol meant to identify Lithuanian Jews with content expressing the history of the Jews in Lithuania.

== Usage in Belarus ==
In modern Belarus, the columns of Gediminas, alongside the Pahonia, are occasionally used as a symbol of national pride.

The columns of Gediminas are in the coat of arms of Brahin in southeastern Belarus.

The symbol is featured on the monument to the Grand Duke Gediminas in Lida, which was unveiled in 2019.

== Usage in Ukraine ==
In Ukraine, the coat of arms of Zhytomyr Oblast adopted an archaic form of the Vytis (Pahonia) on the second quarter, with the Columns of Gediminas on knight's shield.

== See also ==
- Coat of arms of Lithuania
- Gediminas' Tower
- House of Gediminas
- Symbols of the Rurikids
- Tamga

== Sources ==
- Valstybė. Iliustruota Lietuvos enciklopedija
- "Gediminas' Columns". Encyclopedia Lituanica II: 293. (1970–1978). Ed. Simas Sužiedėlis. Boston, Massachusetts: Juozas Kapočius. LCCN 74–114275.
