= National Alliance of Russian Solidarists =

National Alliance of Russian Solidarists Народно-трудовой союз российских солидаристов
- Abbreviation: NTS (English); НТС (Russian)
- Leader: Vyacheslav Dolinin
- Founder: Duke Sergei of Leuchtenberg
- Founded: 1 June 1930; 96 years ago
- Registered: 30 August 1996; 30 years ago (in Russia)
- Split from: Russian All-Military Union
- Preceded by: Russian National Youth League (Russian: Союз русской национальной молодёжи (СРНМ))
- Headquarters: 26th Building, Petrovka Street, Moscow, Russia
- Newspaper: Posev (Sowing); Grani (Facets)
- Ideology: Solidarism; Anti-communism; Anti-liberalism; Anti-Sovietism; Corporatism; Russian nationalism Revolutionary nationalism
- Political position: Right-wing to far-right
- Colours: White; Blue; Red; Yellow
- Slogan: "God is not in power, but in truth!" (Russian: "Не в силе Бог, а в правде!")
- Anthem: Anthem of Free Russia

Party flag

Website
- possev.org

An NTS pin

The National Alliance of Russian Solidarists (abbr. NTS; Russian: Народно-трудовой союз российских солидаристов (НТС), romanized: Narodno-trudovoy soyuz rossiyskikh solidaristov, lit. 'People's Labor Union of Russian Solidarists') is a Russian anticommunist organization founded in 1930 by a group of young Russian anticommunist White émigrés in Belgrade, Serbia (then part of the Kingdom of Yugoslavia). It is also known in English as the National Labor Alliance or the People's Labor Alliance.

The organization formed in response to the older generation of Russian émigrés (veterans of the White movement) whom NTS-members perceived as stagnant and resigned to their loss in the Russian Civil War of 1917–1923. The young people who founded NTS decided to take an active role in fighting against communism: by studying the newly emerging Soviet culture and the psyche of persons living in the Soviet Union, and by developing a political program based on the concept of solidarism.

== Political program ==
The solidarist ideology of the NTS was built on the Christian understanding of people's collective social responsibility for each other's welfare, and the voluntary cooperation between the different layers (as opposed to classes) of society, in opposition to the Marxist concept of the class struggle. It also believed strongly in the "sanctity of the individual", in contrast to Marxist collectivism.

From a 1967 English language NTS pamphlet:

Unlike Communism, Solidarism provides a twentieth-century basis for dealing with present day issues. It rejects a purely materialistic approach to social, economic and political problems. It postulates that man, rather than matter, is the chief problem today. It rejects the concept of class warfare and hatred, and seeks to replace this dubious principle with the idea of co-operation (solidarity), brotherhood, Christian tolerance and charity. Solidarism believes in the innate dignity of the individual and seeks to safeguard as inalienable rights his freedom of speech, conscience and political organization. Solidarists in no way claim that their ideas represent the final answer to all problems, but they believe that man who is master of the atom bomb must also become master of himself and his destiny.

The platform did not rule out a monarchy, but it refused to pre-decide the question of a free Russia's political structure (the policy of "non-predetermination" [Russian: непредрешенчество nepredrešhenčhestvo]) outside of a popular plebiscite. In this regard it was similar to the White movement which deferred the decision of Russia's political structure to a constituent assembly. However, unlike the White movement, its successor organization, the Russian All-Military Union (ROVS), and other emigre organizations, NTS had developed a specific political program which included a definition of human rights and an economic program. This made the organization attract the attention of General Andrey Vlasov during the Russian Liberation Movement, who borrowed many points from NTS's program in developing his own.

The NTS platform rejected the traditional labels of "liberal" and "conservative", claiming "We are not to the right, or to the left, we are at the front!" (Мы не справа и не слева, мы впереди! My ne sprava i ne sleva, my vperedi!) The NTS called for a "second revolution", as opposed to a "counter-revolution", believing that a post-Bolshevik Russia needed to be reborn and avoid returning to the mistakes of the pre-revolutionary era. At the same time, NTS rejected the views of groups such as the Smenovekhovtsi and Mladorossi who called for a reconciliation with the Bolshevik regime, believing that Bolshevism is corrupt and incapable of evolution, therefore it needed to be eradicated, not reformed.

Some liberal critics in the Russian emigre community have accused NTS of having a fascist ideology. For instance, Dr. Marc Raeff wrote in the Slavic Review (Summer, 1989, 48(2), pp. 305–306) that,

They [the NTS] rejected both Bolshevism and liberal capitalism and embraced Russian patriotism and the priority of national solidarity based on productive labor contributed by all societal sectors. They displayed a predisposition for a corporatist organization of society and a willingness to accept a temporary dictatorship in order to bring about the nation's moral and spiritual regeneration. Their ideas unmistakably resembled those of Italian fascism and Portuguese and Austrian corporatism.

NTS supporters believe the organization always defended democratic participation in government (even in the case of a monarch), championed individual liberties, supported individualism, and rejected chauvinism.

== Membership ==
The NTS initially accepted only young men and women under the age of thirty (occasional exceptions were made), feeling that only the generation which could not in any way be seen as accountable for the events of 1917 could lead this battle. This restriction was removed by World War II. Members could be open or secret; the latter was a frequent option during the NTS's activity in the Russian Liberation Movement.

The NTS included not only Russians but other traditional peoples of Russia (e.g., Georgians, Balts, Kalmyks), hence the organization used the term Rossijane (россияне; meaning "peoples of Russia") rather than Russkie (русские; meaning "ethnic Russians") in their political programs. Many Russophiles also joined the organization, e.g., Germans, Poles, Slovenians.

The organization adopted a logo of the Russian flag with the symbol of St. Vladimir, which is also the coat of arms of Ukraine and the Ukrainian People's Republic, to demonstrate the continuity and interrelatedness of Russian and Ukrainian tradition. The trident was also used by NTS as a revolutionary symbol, called the "forks of the people's anger".

Perhaps the most famous NTS member was Alexander Galich, a Soviet screenwriter and bard who joined after he was exiled from the USSR for his critical songs and dissident activities.

== Anti-Soviet activity ==
The NTS believed that force was the only means by which the Soviet regime could be toppled, and that an internal revolution was the best means for this.

The group made several attempts at sending its people into the USSR illegally before, during, and after World War II for the purpose of creating an underground revolutionary force in Soviet Russia. The organization, despite the support of foreign intelligence agencies, could not match the powerful network of the OGPU and NKVD. The pre and post war attempts were the least successful, often ending in shootouts with the Soviet authorities, or capture. The war period was the most successful, although there were a high number of casualties who either suffered at the hands of the German Gestapo, or sleeper cells which were uncovered by the Soviet secret police.

During the Cold War, multiple individuals traveling from the West to the Soviet Union as tourists were arrested with Soviet authorities alleging NTS involvement. Examples included Gerald Brooke in 1965, Nicolas Brocks-Sokolov in 1967, and Edward Chick in 1983.

Some members of the organization had served in German intelligence and propaganda structures during the Second World War.

William Blum has claimed in "Killing Hope" that the CIA worked with the Russian exile anti-communist group National Alliance of Russian Solidarists (NTS) in covert operations inside the Soviet Union. Blum claims the CIA covertly trained, equipped, armed and financed the NTS out of West Germany and secretly dropped their operatives as paratroopers into Soviet territory. From there, Blum claims these groups engaged in actions such as assassinations, stealing documents, derailing trains, wrecking bridges and sabotaging power plants and weapons factories. The Soviet Union claimed it caught about two dozen of these operatives, including a former Nazi collaborator, and subsequently had them executed.

== Association solidarists-corporatists ==
Since 2006, there has been increased activity of the St. Petersburg group of the NTS. The group of anti-communist radicals established a link with a major business structure. A website was created, they have held street protests, and established links in the regions. Because of radicalism and informal links, new activists have any conflicts with management of SPb NTS.

They created an autonomic Association of solidarists-corporatists NTS (NTS(osc)). On behalf of the NTS organization held a number of opposition and anti-communist protests, as well as in its support for the Libyan and Syrian uprisings. Allies of the NTS(osc) have become extremely right-wing organizations (but not racist, in the NTS(osc) includes Caucasian activists) and free trade unions. Now NTS(osc) is a division of the National Alliance of Russian Solidarists. Chairmen of NTS(osc) were Andrew Komaritsin and Stanislav Busigin.

== Propaganda ==
The NTS actively sent out propaganda leaflets via air balloons and other means, including direct mail. Messages with anti-Stalin slogans and the NTS's political program were printed on leaflets, handkerchiefs, fake rubles, false books, etc.

The organization also set up a radio station called Radio Free Russia. Broadcasts were made from West Germany into the Soviet zone until the West German government was pressured by the Soviet government to shut the station down.

== Publications ==
The Posev publishing house was run by NTS as a means of publishing anti-Soviet literature. Samizdat literature smuggled outside of the USSR was published, such as Aleksandr Solzhenitsyn's writings and the poems of Alexander Galich and Bulat Okudzhava. Posev (Посев, lit. "sowing" in Russian) is also the name of a magazine published by NTS since 1945.

The Posev publishing house now mainly publishes books on Russian history, focusing specifically on the history of the anti-communist movement.

== Presidents ==
- 1930-1933 Duke Sergei Leuchtenberg
- 1934-1954 Viktor M. Baydalakov
- 1955-1972 Vladimir D. Poremsky
- 1972-1984 Aleksandr Artemov
- 1984-1995 Evgeni Romanovich Ostrovsky (Romanov)
- 1995–2008 Boris Sergeevich Pushkarev
- 2008–2014 Aleksandr Nikolaevich Shvedov
- 2014–Present Vyacheslav Emmanuilovich Dolinin
- 1997–2001 Leonid Dmitrievich Kuznechov, breakaway group in Perm

== Soviet response ==
The Soviets responded to NTS's activities via several methods including arrests, assassination attempts, kidnappings, counterpropaganda, and diplomatic pressure. NTS members who were found in Soviet controlled territories were arrested. Several assassination attempts were made against key NTS members. One of them, NTS chairman Georgiy Okolovich, had his would be assassin, Nikolai Khokhlov, confess to him and defect, embarrassing the Soviet government with his media campaign. There were also several bombing attempts.

Dr. Rudolf Trušnovič, a prominent NTS member of Slovenian origin, was kidnapped by Stasi agent Heinz Glezke and smuggled abroad in a Soviet diplomatic car to the East German sector. He is believed to have died in transit as a result of the trauma from the struggle that ensued during his kidnapping.

Anti-NTS pamphlets and newsreel films were produced by the USSR. One such pamphlet was supposedly written by Konstantin Cherezov, a former NTS member who defected from Germany back to the USSR. The pamphlet accuses the leaders of NTS being employees of American and British intelligence. It also labels them as drunkards, homosexuals and gamblers who had at one point or another served the Nazi regime.

In addition, the Soviet government used its international ties to pressure foreign governments to suppress NTS's activities. One such successful example was the closing down of "Radio Free Russia" by the West German government.

== Songs ==
A song titled "The Bright Hour Knocks" (Бьёт светлый час B'ot svetlij čas) became the organization's main song, used as an anthem but never called such. It was written in the early 1930s by NTS member Mikhail Gnilorybov.

Another song was also very popular, called "Youth" (Молодёжная Molod'ožnaja) or "The Past is the Source of Inspiration" (В былом источник вдохновенья V bylom istočnik vdochnoven'ja), written by NTS member Pavel Zelensky (Павел Николаевич Зеленский; 1904–1978) in the late 1930s. This song was also adopted by the Russian Scout organization ORYuR as the anthem of its leadership circle, which had many NTS members.

== See also ==
- Congress of Russian Americans
- White movement
- Russian Liberation Movement
- Russian All-Military Union (ROVS)
- VSKhSON
- White Emigre
- Russian All National Popular State Movement
- Mladorossy
- Smenovekhovtsy
- Evraziitsi
