= Gerald Brooke =

British teacher

Gerald Brooke (born 1938 in Sheffield, England) was a British teacher who taught Russian in the early 1960s at Holborn College for Law, Languages and Commerce in Red Lion Square, Holborn, central London.

In 1965, during the Easter break, he travelled to the Soviet Union. Brooke and his wife Barbara were arrested on 25 April by KGB agents for smuggling anti-Soviet leaflets.

Barbara was later released and returned to Britain, but Gerald was sentenced to five years' detention, including four years in labour camps, for "subversive anti-Soviet activity on the territory of the Soviet Union". Brooke lived in Finchley in northwest London, and his case was raised in the House of Commons by local MP Margaret Thatcher.

After four years in custody he was exchanged, on 24 July 1969, for Soviet spies Morris and Lona Cohen, whose "worknames" (code names) while in the UK were Peter and Helen Kroger, who had been arrested by Special Branch detectives. The Russian authorities only told Brooke he was being sent home 24 hours before he was released back to Britain. Upon his arrival at Heathrow Brooke was surprised by the huge presence of journalists and reporters.

The exchange was recorded in Hansard on 24 July 1969 Lords sitting, by Lord Chalfont. The exchange conditions agreed to by the Soviet authorities stated that the day after the Cohens' departure from the UK, Michael Parsons and Anthony Lorraine, imprisoned for four and three years respectively for alleged drug offences, would also be released. Parsons and Lorraine arrived back in UK on 25 October 1969.

Brooke explained that he was suffering from an inflamed colon, aggravated by prison food, and he was not used to speaking English or seeing so many people. Prevented from saying too much about his ordeal, he simply stated that prison conditions "were not particularly soft". The Cohens returned on 24 October 1969 to the Soviet Union after serving nine years of their 20-year sentence.

Such exchanges had happened before. Notable examples included Soviet spy Rudolf Abel for U2 pilot Francis Gary Powers, and Konon Molody (aka Gordon Lonsdale) for Greville Wynne, but British Prime Minister Harold Wilson's Labour government was criticised by the opposition for agreeing to release Peter and Helen Kroger in exchange for Brooke. Opponents claimed it set a dangerous precedent, and was an example of blackmail rather than a fair exchange.

Brooke later claimed he had passed on concealed documents, including codes, on behalf of the National Alliance of Russian Solidarists.

In later years, Gerald Brooke taught Russian language, among other things, at the Languages Faculty of the University of Westminster (the same institution as had been called Holborn College, and which was also called, during the 1970s and 1980s, the Polytechnic of Central London). The Languages Faculty was based in Euston Road, London.
