= Cossack with musket =

National emblem of the Cossack Hetmanate and Ukrainian State

Coat of Arms of the Zaporozhian Host

Versions
- Coat of Arms of the Zaporozhian Host (Lower)

- Coat of Arms of the Ukrainian State (1918) (Note: small coat of arms created by Heorhiy Narbut)
- Adopted: 1648
- Crest: Tryzub (variation)
- Shield: Azure, cossack with rifle Or
- Supporters: None

The Cossack with rifle, sometimes as Knight with rifle or Cossack with musket (Ukrainian: Лицар із самопалом, romanized: Lytsar iz samopalom), is a former national emblem of the Cossack Hetmanate (Zaporozhian Host). In the early 20th century, it was used as the official national emblem of the short-lived Ukrainian State.

== Overview ==
Sign of Ukrainian cossacks Otaman of the 16th century, Hryhoriy Loboda

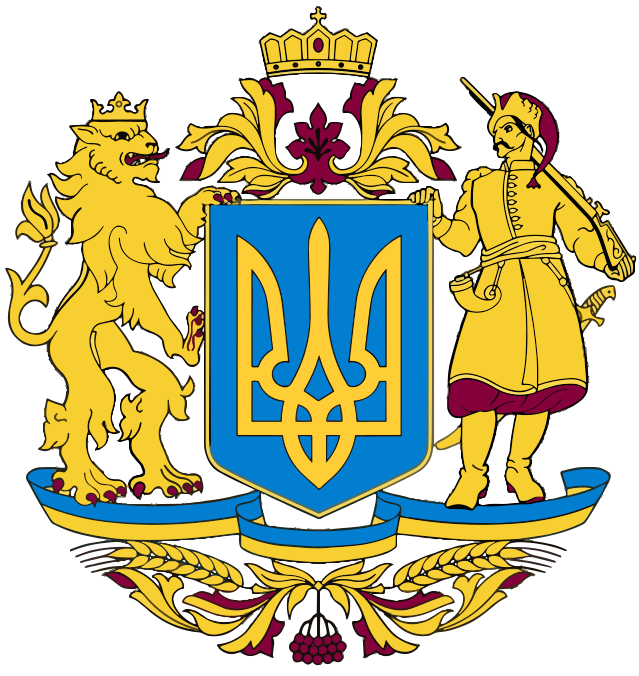
A draft of the large coat of arms of Ukraine (Cossack with musket on the right) (Note: The coat of arms was adopted by the Cabinet of Ukraine in 2009, but has not yet been reviewed by the Verkhovna Rada.)

The literal translation of the emblem is "Knight with improvised weapon". However, samopal more precisely here means a general rifle rather than an improvised firearm. According to an arts studies specialist, samopal used to refer to any rifle but musket or carbine.

The origin of the emblem is uncertain, while its first records date back to 1592. On the initiative of Pyotr Rumyantsev the emblem was phased out and replaced with the Russian double-head eagle in 1767.

The emblem was revived by Pavlo Skoropadskyi, the hetman of all Ukraine, in 1918. However, later the emblem disappeared again until in 2005 it reappeared on the proposed Great Seal of Ukraine.

According to the Constitution of Ukraine, the emblem has to be included into the Great Seal of Ukraine.

== Description ==
Based on images of the Zaporizhian Host Coat of Arms, they define four iconographic types of the base coat of arms figure (cossack):

1. Coat of Arms of Host (before 1648) body and head is turned three quarters to the left, feet pacing to the left, right arm hangs freely at a hip, left – holds stock of rifle at 45° angle to body
2. Coat of Arms of Zaporizhian Host Municipal (1648–1670, Cossack Hetmanate) body and head is turned three quarters to the left, feet at shoulder width forward, right arm behind back, left – holds stock of rifle at 45° angle to body
3. Coat of Arms of Zaporizhian Host Municipal (1670–1766, Left-bank Ukraine) body and head is turned three quarters to the left, feet at shoulder width forward, right arm at waist, left – holds stock of rifle at 90° angle to body
4. Coat of Arms of Zaporizhian Host Lower (1670–1775, Zaporizhian Sich) body and head is turned three quarters to the left, feet at shoulder width forward, right arm at waist, left – holds stock of rifle at 90° angle to body, left near cossack available spear (at later versions to the left of the spear a structure)

== Gallery ==
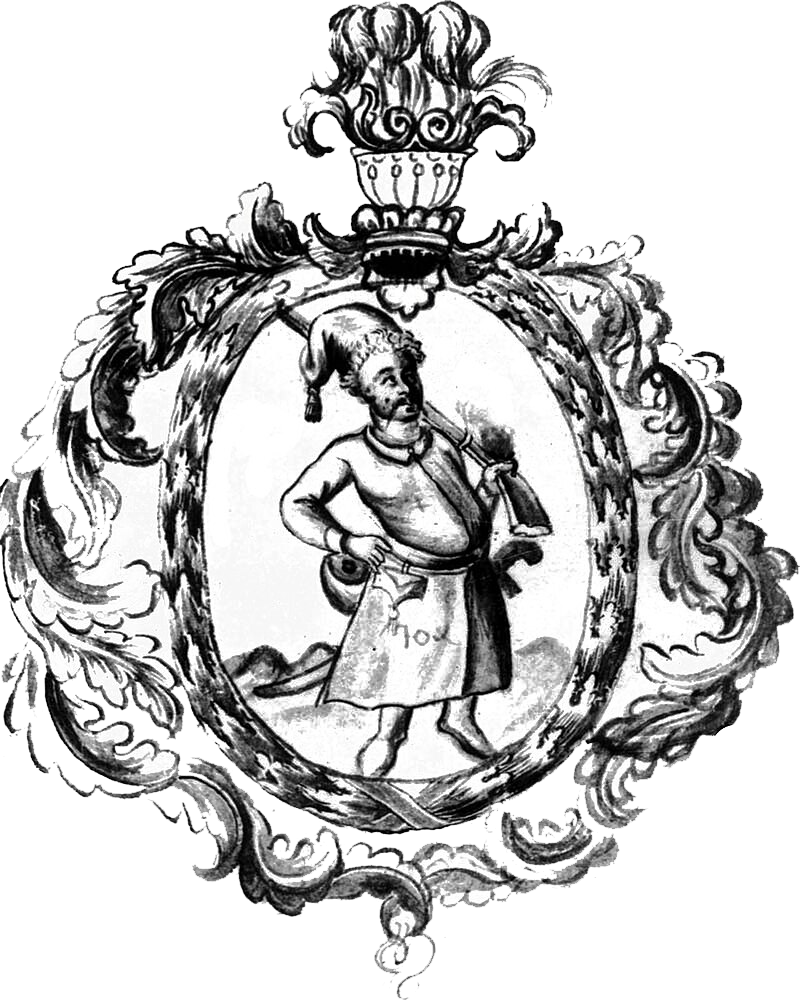
Coat of arms of the Ukrainian Cossacks from the chronicles of Hryhoriy Hrabyanka (end of XVII century)

Dnipropetrovsk Oblast

Zaporizhia Oblast

Cherkasy

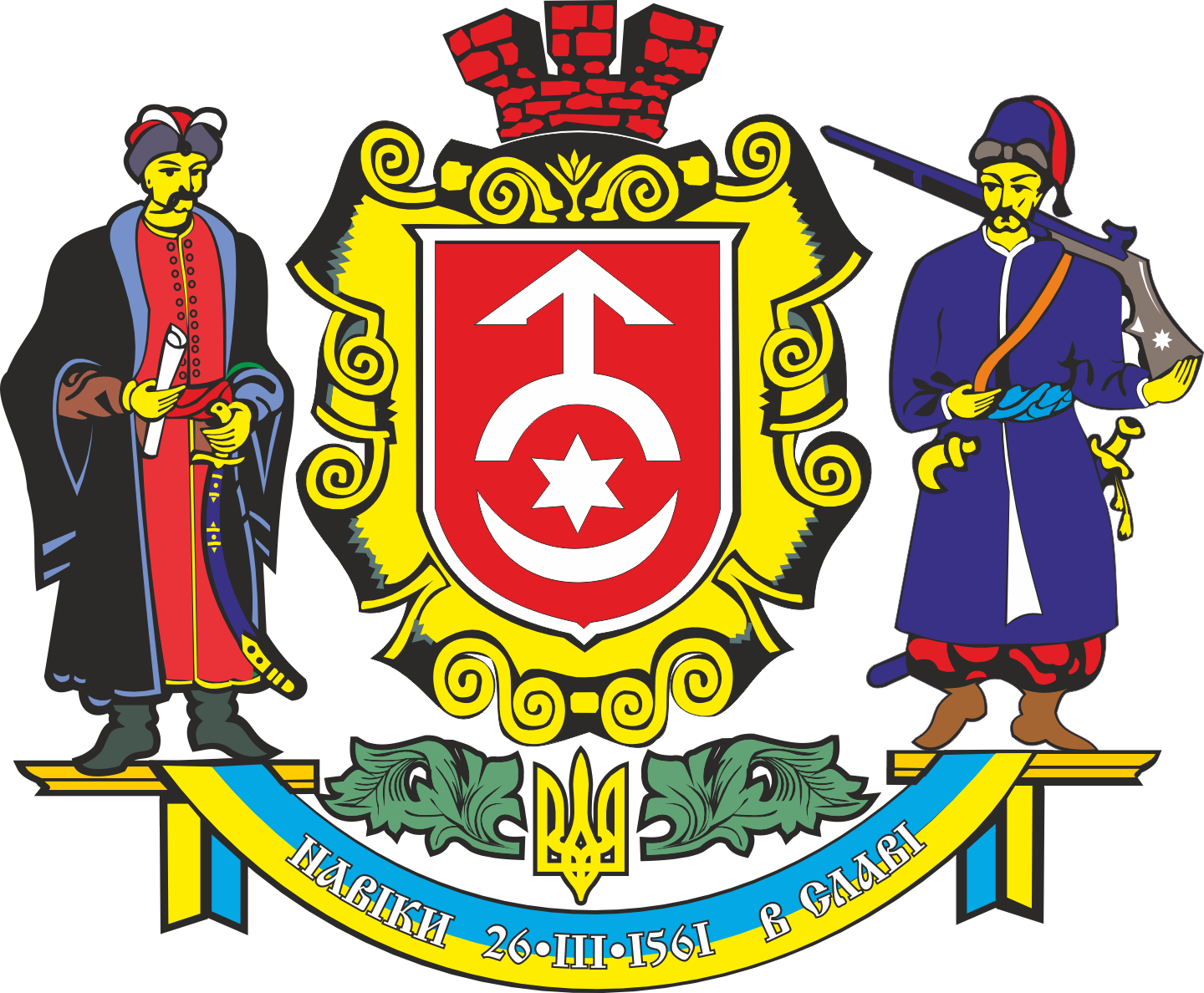
Starokostiantyniv

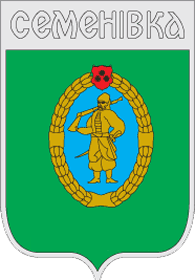
Semenivka

Kuban People's Republic

Russian political project Novorossiya
(2014–2015)

== See also ==
- Coat of arms of Ukraine
