= Symbols of the Rurikids =

Heraldic designs

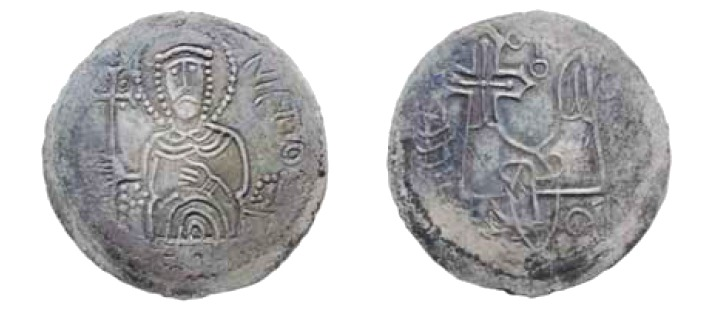
Srebrenik (silver coin) of Sviatopolk I of Kiev. On the reverse of the coin is stamped the princely symbol of Sviatopolk in the form of a bident, of which the left prong ends in a cross.

Throughout the early Middle Ages, the Rurikid knyazes of the Kievan Rus' used unique symbols to denote property rights over various items. They are depicted on punches, seals, and coins of the Rurikids. In contrast to Western European heraldry, where coats of arms belonged to entire families, or were inherited without changes by firstborn sons, Rurikid symbols were personal, with every knyaz devising an emblem of their own for themselves.

== Images of knyazes’ symbols ==
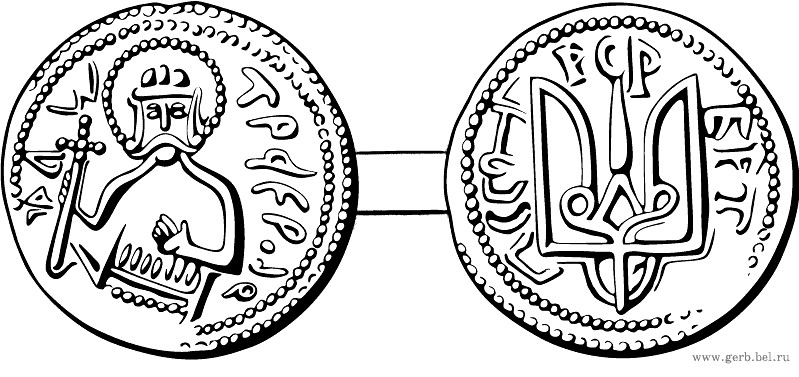
A srebrenik of Vladimir the Great.

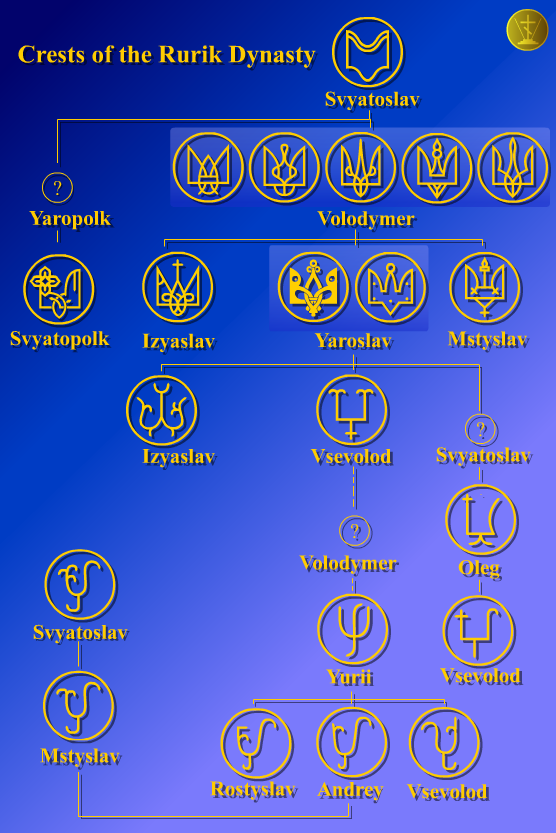
The personal symbols of the Rurikid knyazes.

As a rule, on the coins of Kievan knyazes, one encounters figures in the form of bidents and tridents. The same symbols could look different depending on the item on which they were depicted. Thus, the emblems of the knyazes on seals are depicted schematically, in a maximally simplified form, whilst on coins the same symbols have a large number of additional ornamental elements. The heraldic symbols of Rus’ knyazes are known to us not only in the form of depictions on coins and seals, but also on pendants, rings, weapons, etc. Based on these findings, it is possible not only to trace the evolution of the symbols of the knyazes of Kievan Rus’, but also to try to reconstruct their origins.

== Coats of arms of the Rurik Dynasty ==
957—972	Svyatoslav I Igorevich	Grand Knyaz of Kiev from the Rurik dynasty.
978—1015	Volodymyr I Sviatoslavych	Grand Knyaz of Kiev from the Rurik dynasty.
1015—1016	Sviatopolk I Vladimirovich	Grand Knyaz of Kiev from the Rurik dynasty.
1016—1018	Yaroslav I Vladimirovich	Grand Knyaz of Kiev from the Rurik dynasty.
1018—1019	Sviatopolk I Vladimirovich	Grand Knyaz of Kiev from the Rurik dynasty.
1019—1054	Yaroslav I Vladimirovich	Grand Knyaz of Kiev from the Rurik dynasty.
1054—1068	Iziaslav Yaroslavich	Grand Knyaz of Kiev from the Rurik dynasty.
1069—1073	Iziaslav Yaroslavich	Grand Knyaz of Kiev from the Rurik dynasty.
1076—1077	Vsevolod I Yaroslavich	Grand Knyaz of Kiev from the Rurik dynasty.
1077—1078	Iziaslav Yaroslavich	Grand Knyaz of Kiev from the Rurik dynasty.
1078—1093	Vsevolod I Yaroslavich	Grand Knyaz of Kiev from the Rurik dynasty.
1149—1151	Yuri I Vladimirovich	Grand Knyaz of Kiev from the Rurik dynasty.

== Coats of arms on coins and seals ==
Coat of arms of Svyatoslav I Igorevich

Coat of arms of Vladimir the Great

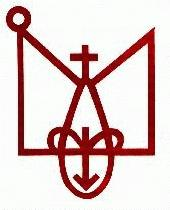
Coat of arms of Iziaslav of Polotsk

Coat of arms of Yaroslav the Wise

== History ==
=== Origins ===
The use of depictions of the bident and trident makes the symbols of the Rurikids resemble the complex imperial coats of arms of the Bosporan Kingdom, the basic elements of which were likewise these symbols. In common with the Bosporans, the Rus’ princely emblem indicates preferential use of the bident as the basis of the composition of “coats of arms”. Another point of resemblance between the emblems of the Rus’ knyazes and the arms of the Bosporan tsars is the hereditary character of their development. As was already said above, the “coats of arms” of Rus’ knyazes were personal symbols, not passing on to descendants, but, as with the symbols of the Bosporan Kingdom, having one basis in the form of a bident, to which every ruler added (or from which they removed) elements in the form of various sorts of “offshoots”, curls, etc. Amidst the “coats of arms” of the Rus’ knyazes one meets with even complete analogues of the coats of arms of Bosporan rulers. For example, the personal sign of Yaroslav the Wise on belt plaques found near Lake Ladoga and in the vicinity of Suzdal is practically completely identical to the depiction on sets of belts from the Pereschepinsk hoard of Poltava oblast, produced in the 7th and 8th centuries in the Central Black Sea Coast. Both this and other depictions resemble the form of a trident. Such signs (bidents and tridents) were widely used in the territory of the Khazar Khanate as symbols of supreme authority — they were the tamgas of the ruling families. This was a continuation of Sarmato-Alan traditions of the use of such signs, dating from the time of the Bosporan Kingdom. Bident and trident tamgas are known from the 8th and 9th centuries in the Khazar world in the details of belt garnitures (Podgorovsky tumulus), in the form of graffiti on the stone blocks and bricks of fortresses (Sarkel, Mayatsky, Semikarakorsky, and Khumarian settlements), and in the form of pottery stamps on vessels (Dmitrievsky tumulus). Possibly in the Kievan Rus’ such symbols came straight from the Khazars, much like the title “Khagan”, known to the first Rus’ knyazes.

=== Written sources ===
The first information on the emblems of Rus knyazes comes from the middle of the 10th century. Ebn Meskavayh, in his description of the Rus’ campaign against Barda in 943–944, noted that the Rus’, when taking ransom for prisoners, left their symbol in the form of a piece of clay with a seal, so that the former prisoner would be handled no more. What sort of symbol was depicted on the seal is unknown; it is possible that it might have been the coat of arms of Igor of Kiev, who reigned in those years. It is also unknown whether these Rus’ belonged to the army of Igor, since ancient Rus’ chronicles are silent regarding the campaign against Barda. Further information on such types of stamps is found in the Primary Chronicle, which discusses the campaign of Olga of Kiev in the north: “In the summer of 6455 [947 C.E.] Olga went to Novgorod and established over the Msta pogosts and tribute, and over the Luga dues and tribute; and her hunting grounds were over all lands and signs and places and pogosts.” The word “signs” here refers to the symbols marking the knyaz's property. Russkaya Pravda testifies that this word means an item marked with the knyaz's symbol. In Russkaya Pravda there are also other references to the sphere of the knyaz's emblems: “But for the knyaz’s horse, which has a mark, 3 grivĭnas.” Undoubtedly, by the word “mark” one is to understand “the knyaz’s brand (stamp)”. Written sources, however, do not give a description of the knyazes’ emblems. Depictions of the “coats of arms” of Rus’ knyazes are known to us by surviving coins and seals of the time.

=== Decline of the personal symbols of the knyazes ===
The knyazes’ personal symbols proliferated widely over the territory of the Kievan Rus’. Seals with their images notarized state documents, coins were minted with the symbol of the knyaz, and artisans branded their products with the knyaz's coat of arms. The “coat of arms” of the knyaz was borne by the tivuns and the druzhina. In this form the symbols of the Rurikids survived to the middle of the 12th century. In the 13th century the coats of arms of the knyazes practically wholly fell into disuse, which is often associated with their evolution. According to many scientists, the schemes of the arms simplified so much that they lost the ability to create variants marking individual ownership. Consequently, the knyaz's “coat of arms” lost its personal character and acquired the character of the emblem of a place or the coat of arms of a family.

Ostrogski coat of arms.

Coat of arms of the princes of the Czetwertyński family.

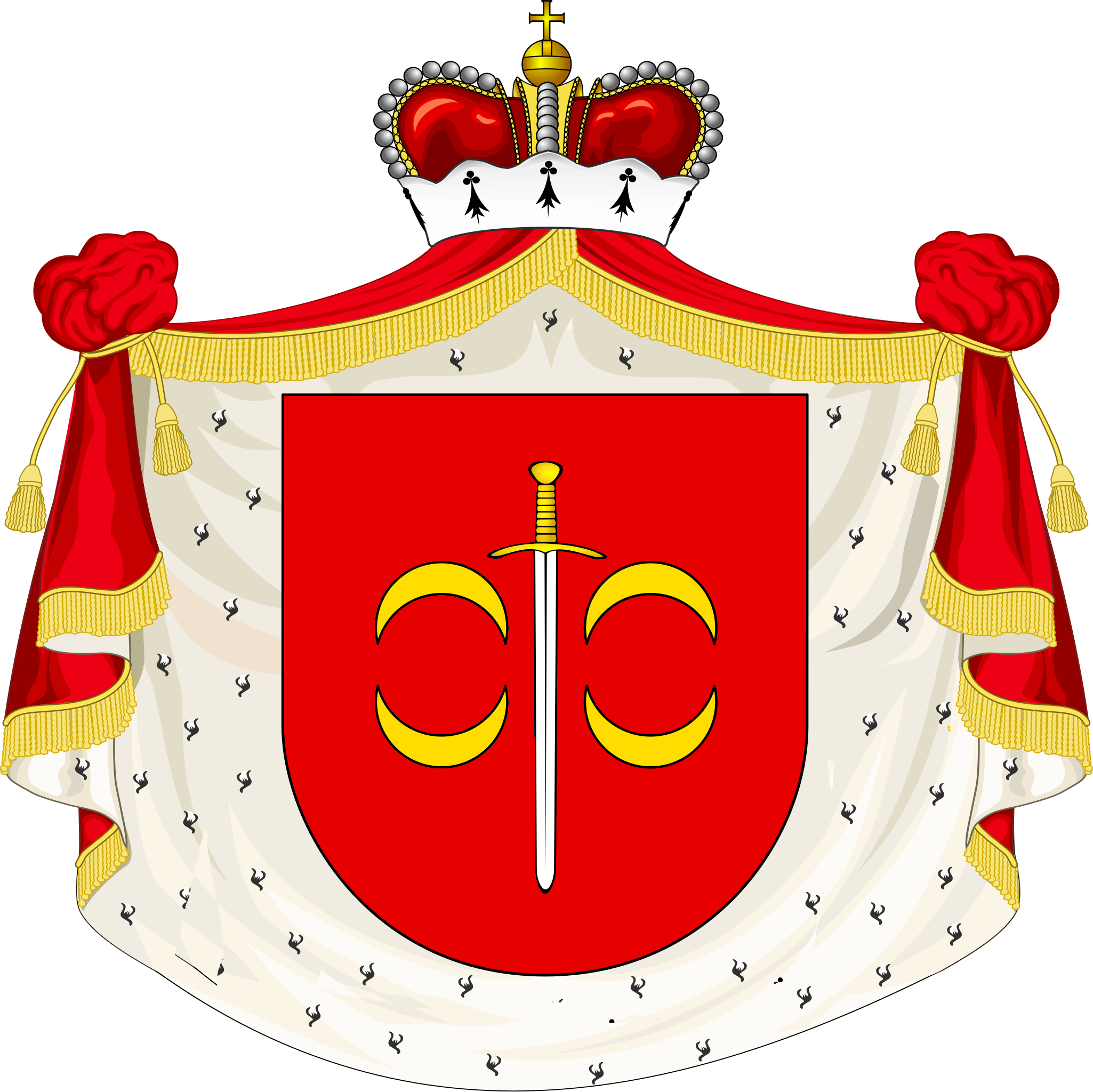
Coat of arms of the princes of the Druccy family.

Coat of arms of the princes of the Ogiński family.

Coat of arms of the princes of the Volkonsky house.

Coat of arms of the princes of the Dolgorukov family.

== Modern usage ==
Despite the fact that the heraldic symbols of the knyaz of Kievan Rus’ ceased to be used in the 13th century, in the 20th century some of them began to be used in the role of coats of arms and emblems.

=== Coat of arms of Ukraine ===
Coat of arms of Ukraine.

In 1917 after the October Revolution, when on the territory of the former Russian Empire new states began to form, the trident (Ukrainian: Тризуб, tryzub) of Knyaz Volodymyr was proposed by historian Mykhailo Hrushevskyi as a national symbol for Ukraine. The status of the small coat of arms of the Ukrainian People's Republic as the personal symbol of Volodymyr was given on 22 March 1918 as a result of a decision of the Central Council of Ukraine. Later this symbol was used with several modifications and additions by Ukrainian state entities created during the period from 1918 to 1920. With the establishment of Soviet power over Ukraine, the trident lost its official status, but continued to be used by organizations of Ukrainian nationalists, and also, with the addition of a cross on a prong, as a component in the coat of arms proclaimed in 1939 for Carpatho-Ukraine. In 1941 it was used by the Ukrainian National Government.

Small coat of arms of the Ukrainian People's Republic.

Large coat of arms of the Ukrainian People's Republic.

Coat of arms of the Ukrainian State.

Coat of arms of Carpatho-Ukraine.

State seal of the Ukrainian National Government (1941).

After the collapse of the USSR in 1991, by decree of the Verkhovna Rada on 19 February 1992 the trident was approved as the small state coat of arms of Ukraine. In accordance with article 20 of the constitution of Ukraine of 1996, “the main element of the large State Coat of Arms of Ukraine is the Symbol of the Princely State of Volodymyr the Great (the small State Coat of Arms of Ukraine)” (which, despite the official status of this decision, makes a historic stretch: as was said above, the “coat of arms” of Volodymyr was only his personal symbol, as with the other emblems of the Rurikids of the time).

==== Coats of arms of administrative divisions of Ukraine ====
In the coats of arms of the cities, raions, oblasts, and other administrative divisions of Ukraine, the trident of Volodymyr is widely used, but in addition symbols of other Rurikids are also used. Thus, for example, on the coat of arms and flag of the Chernihiv oblast is depicted the symbol of Knyaz Mstislav of Chernigov — founder of the Principality of Chernihiv.

Coat of arms of Chernihiv Oblast.

Coat of arms of Halych.

Flag of Halych.

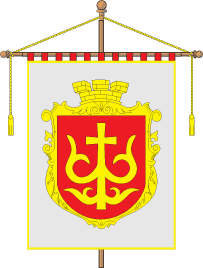
Banner of Shatsk, Ukraine.

Coat of arms of Vinnytsia

==== Symbolism of Ukrainian institutions and organizations ====
The trident of Vladimir is used in the symbolism of the state institutions of Ukraine, and its stylizations still continue to be used in many Ukrainian organizations throughout the world.

The emblem of the Ukrainian Ministry of Defence.

Emblem of the Football Federation of Ukraine until 2016.

Current emblem of the Ukrainian Association of Football.

Coat of arms of the Ukrainian Military Organization (1920—1929), Organization of Ukrainian Nationalists (1929—1940, Melnyk faction after 1940).

Emblem of the scouting organization Plast.

Emblem of the People's Movement of Ukraine.

Flag of the right-wing paramilitary and political party Right Sector.

==== Religious symbolism ====
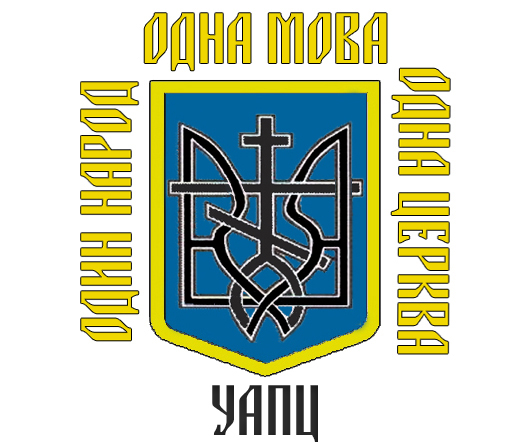
Coat of arms of the UAPC.

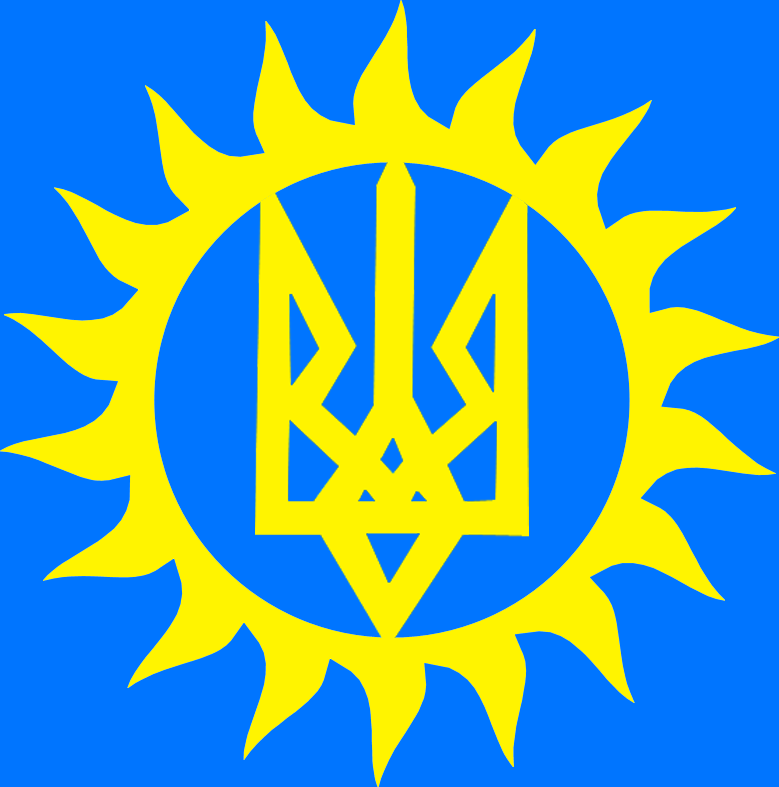
Coat of arms-symbol of the Native Ukrainian National Faith.

A modified trident of Saint Vladimir was found as a basic element of the coat of arms of the Ukrainian Autocephalous Orthodox Church (UAPC) before it merged to form the Orthodox Church of Ukraine.

The trident of Volodymyr is also used by followers of the Native Ukrainian National Faith, a branch of the Slavic Native Faith, as part of the basic symbol of their religion — the trident umbegone by sunbeams.

=== Coats of arms of administrative divisions of Belarus ===
In Belarus the trident of Izyaslav of Polotsk is used as a component of the coats of arms of several settlements and raions.

Coat of arms of Zaslawye.

Coat of arms of Brahin.

=== Coats of arms of administrative divisions of Russia ===
In Russia the falcon of Rurik is used as a component of the coats of arms of several settlements and raions. The fast bird image is perceived as Rurik's family totem. The image of the falcon, symbolizing the heroic warrior, knyaz leading his military squad, is repeatedly mentioned in the cornerstone of ancient literature of Kievan Rus The Tale of Igor's Campaign. As a patrimonial symbol of knyazes, the image of falcon has been present on the flags and emblems of several Russian cities, such as Suzdal, Sokol, Kumertau, and others.

Coat of arms of Staraya Ladoga

=== Coats of arms of armed forces of Italy ===
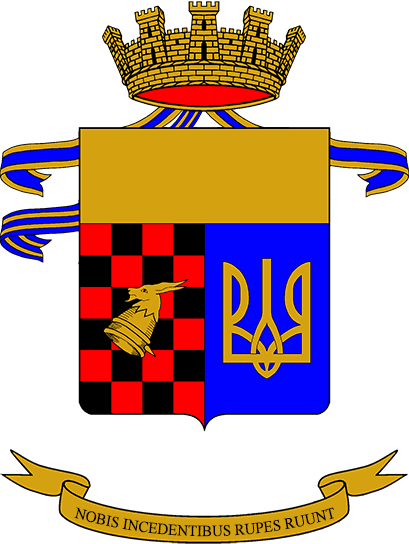
Coat of arms of the third artillery regiment of the Italian armed forces

The trident of Vladimir is present on the coats of arms of all the armed forces of Italy which fought on the territory of Ukraine during the Second World War.

=== Emblem of the NTS ===
The trident of Vladimir is also used by the National Alliance of Russian Solidarists, founded in 1930 by Russian emigrants in Belgrade. According to article 7 of the modern charter of the union, “the emblem of the movement is the native symbol of the great knyaz Saint Vladimir, the founder of Kyevan Rus, depicted in the form of a golden trident on a white, blue, and red field, or in black and white with no field”.

== Bibliography ==
- Болсуновскій К. В. Родовой знакъ Рюриковичей, великихъ князей кіевскихъ. Геральдическое изслѣдованіе, предназначенное къ чтенію на XIV Археологическомъ Съѣздѣ в г. Черниговѣ. Kiev, Typo-lithography by С. В. Кульженко, 1908; 8 с.: ил.
- Русская Правда по спискам Академическому, Карамзинскому и Троицкому. Edited by Professor Б. Д. Грекова. Moscow — Leningrad, 1934.
- Рыбаков Б. А. Знаки собственности в княжеском хозяйстве Киевской Руси X—XII вв.
- Шахматов А. А. Повесть временных лет, т. I, Petrograd, 1916.
- Якубовский А. Ю. Ибн-Мискавейх о походе русов в Бердаа в 943—944 гг. in “Византийский временник”. Leningrad, 1926, т. XXIV.
- Янин В. Л. Актовые печати Древней Руси X—XV вв., т. 1-2. Moscow, 1970.
- Янин В. Л. Княжеские знаки суздальских Рюриковичей. — КСИИМК, 1956, вып. 62.
- Молчанов А. А. Знаки Рюриковичей: итоги и проблемы изучения // Древнейшие государства Восточной Европы. 2005. Рюриковичи и Российская государственность. — М., 2008. — С. 250—270.
