= Erhard Kroeger =

Nazi Germany civil servant, SS leader (1905–1987)

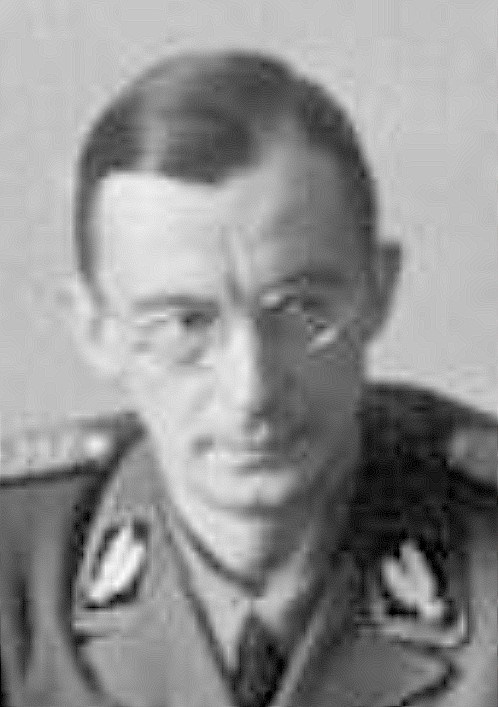
Erhard Kroeger

Erhard Kroeger or Kröger (24 March 1905 – 24 September 1987) was a Baltic German SS officer involved in the resettlement of Baltic Germans before World War II. He commanded an Einsatzgruppe in 1941, and was later attached to General Andrey Vlasov and the German sponsored Russian Liberation Army of World War II. He was convicted of war crimes in 1969.

== Early years ==
Erhard Kroeger was born and grew up in Riga, Russian Empire, a member of the historic Baltic German minority there. In his youth, he played ice hockey with Wilfried Strik-Strikfeldt. Kroeger made his name as an SS activist challenging the conservative Baltic German leadership of Wilhelm von Rüdiger and trying to Nazify the Latvian German minority before 1939.

“In July 1937 the new VOMI chief ordered Eric Mundel, who in 1935 had replaced Rüdiger as the leader of the Volksgemeinschaft [Latvian German minority association], to bring Kröger into the leadership.”

== Germany ==
At the height of the Sudetenland crisis and Hitler’s guarantees that he had no further territorial interests in Europe: “Kröger.…without authorization from Berlin, assured his followers that the Führer had not abandoned them, implying that revision remained a possibility.”

SS Sturmbannführer Kroeger was admonished by his SS and VOMI superiors and visited Berlin in September 1939 where he was secretly advised of the Nazi plans to trade Latvia and Estonia to Joseph Stalin. In a post-war document he related:

The only thing that rushed through my mind was the salvation of an essential and closely linked ethnic group which, it seemed to me, was at this moment already threatened with certain destruction without even knowing it.

At a meeting with Heinrich Himmler, Kroeger stressed the serious hostility and animosity of the Communists to the Baltic Germans following the Russian Civil War.

The next day Himmler received him for a second time. He had spoken to Hitler, and he told Kroeger that “the Führer agreed with the evacuation of the Baltic German community as a whole, but stipulated that this should be done with the approval of the Soviet government.” Himmler also reported that the Baltic Germans were to be settled in those parts of Poland annexed to the Reich, including Posen and West Prussia.

Erhard Kroeger then worked extremely hard to ensure as many as 60,000 Baltic Germans were allowed to leave Estonia and Latvia over the autumn of 1939 to be settled in Germany.

== Einsatzkommando ==
Following the Nazi attack on Soviet Union, SS-Sturmbannführer Erhard Kroeger was part of an Einsatzgruppe between June and November 1941.

From June to November 1941 commanded Einsatzkommando 6 of Einsatzgruppe C. While in command of this unit it murdered 100 Jews at Dobromyl. Kroeger had initially been ordered to kill 307 Jews, but the number to be murdered was reduced after he complained. He was personally present for the killings. Kroeger was decorated with the Iron Cross while commander of the Einsatzkommando.

SS-Oberführer. Head of Sonderkommando Ost which was set up by the SD. In 1943 was enlisted in Division SS "Hohenstaufen". Also Head of the Russian desk in Leitstelle Ost under Arlt from July 1944.

== Vlasov ==
In 1944 the SS took an interest in General Andrey Vlasov and his Russian Liberation Movement and in summer the head of the SS main leadership office, SS Obergruppenführer Gottlob Berger, specifically appointed Kroeger as a formal liaison officer between Vlasov and the SS.

== Postwar ==
Until 1962 he lived under assumed names in the Federal Republic of Germany, Switzerland and in Bologna. On 10 January 1962 the District Court of Wuppertal issued an arrest warrant for Kroeger on suspicion that he had been involved in massacres during the war. He was subsequently arrested on 31 December 1965 in Steinmaur-Sünikon in the canton of Zurich. The Land of North Rhine-Westphalia then made a formal extradition request. Kroeger argued that the twenty-year limitation period for prosecution had expired, and that the killings were politically motivated, that he was not present for most of the killings, and that those that he did admit involvement in legitimate wartime reprisals under international law. The Swiss Federal Court rejected this argument, however, and agreed to his extradition. After extradition to Germany and the issuance of a second arrest warrant on 22 February 1966, Kroeger was held in custody from 17 May 1966 until 5 October 1967. On 31 July 1969 Kroeger was sentenced by the District Court of Tuebingen to three years and four months in prison for the mass killing of Jews in Western Ukraine between June 1941 and February 1942.

== Literature ==
- Lumans, Valdis O., “Himmler’s Auxiliaries; The Volksdeutsche Mittelstelle and the German National Minorities of Europe, 1933–1945” – 1993. ISBN 0-8078-2066-0 / ISBN 978-0-8078-2066-7
- Debórah Dwork and Robert Jan van Pelt, “Auschwitz; 1270 to the Present” – 1996. ISBN 0-300-06755-0 ISBN 978-0300067552
- Erhard Kroeger, Dokument 314, in Dietrich A. Loeber, ed. Diktierte Option: Die Umsiedlung der Deutsch-Balten und Lettland (Neumünster : Karl Wachholtz), 1972.
- Strik-Strikfeldt, W. Against Stalin and Hitler: Memoir of the Russian Liberation Movement, 1941–1945. — NY: Day, 1970. ISBN 0-381-98185-1 ISBN 978-0381981853
