= Gaginsky District =

Gaginsky District Гагинский район (Russian)
- District
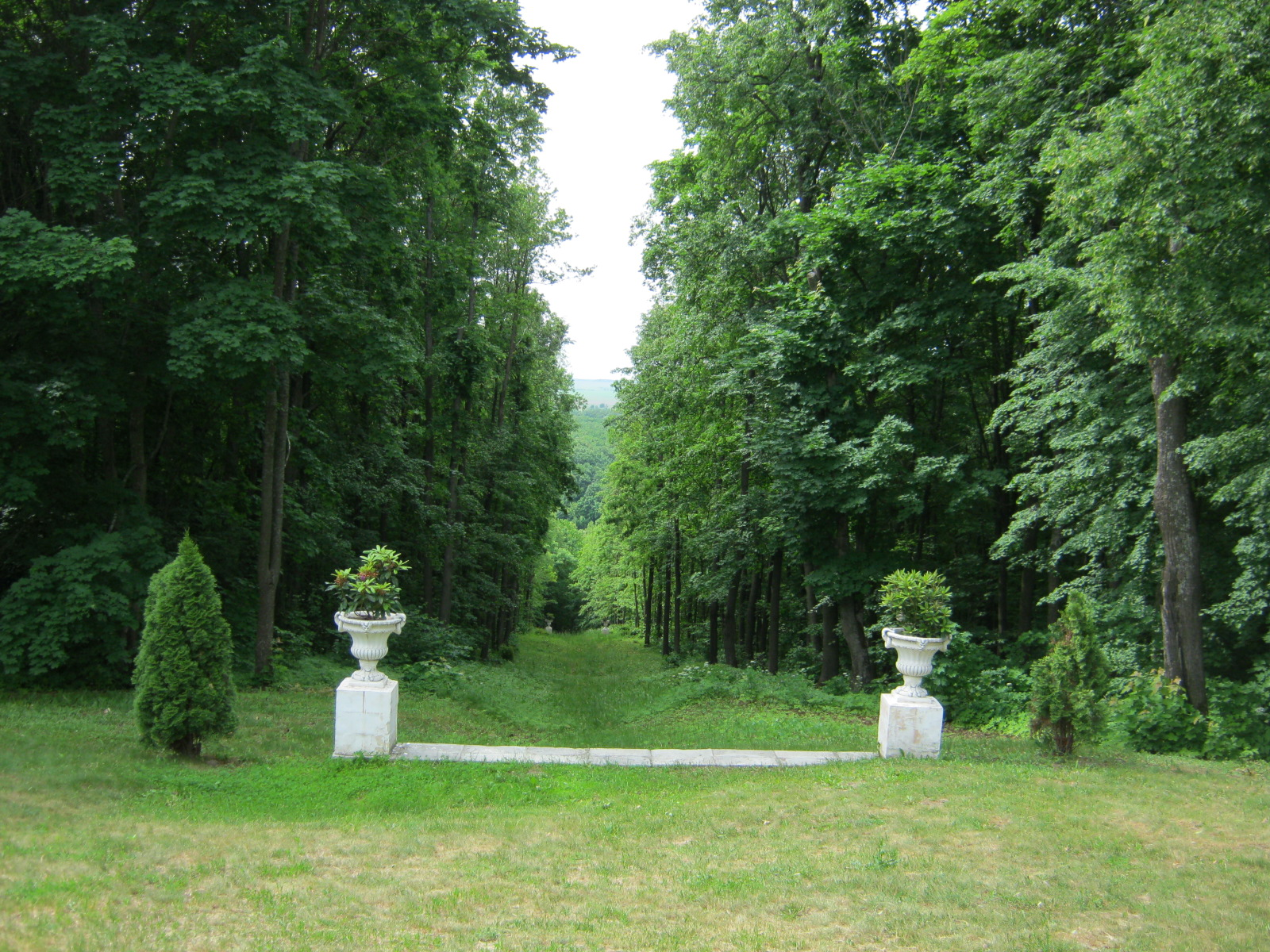
- Estate park in Gaginsky District

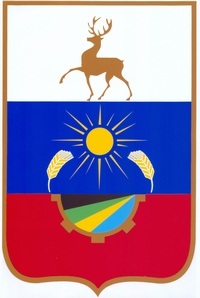
- Coat of arms
- Location of Gaginsky District in Nizhny Novgorod Oblast
- Coordinates: 55°14′03″N 45°02′37″E
- Country: Russia
- Federal subject: Nizhny Novgorod Oblast
- Established: 1929
- Administrative center: Gagino

Area
  - Total: 1,064.2 km^{2} (410.9 sq mi)

Population (2010 Census)
  - Total: 12,444
  - Density: 11.693/km^{2} (30.285/sq mi)
  - Urban: 0%
  - Rural: 100%

Administrative structure
  - Administrative divisions: 6 Selsoviets
  - Inhabited localities: 67 rural localities

Municipal structure
  - Municipally incorporated as: Gaginsky Municipal District
  - Municipal divisions: 0 urban settlements, 6 rural settlements
- Time zone: UTC+3 (MSK)
- OKTMO ID: 22626000
- Website: http://www.gagino.ru

Gaginsky District (Russian: Га́гинский райо́н) is an administrative district (raion), one of the forty in Nizhny Novgorod Oblast, Russia. Municipally, it is incorporated as Gaginsky Municipal District. It is located in the southeast of the oblast. The area of the district is 1,064.2 square kilometers (410.9 sq mi). Its administrative center is the rural locality (a selo) of Gagino. Population: 12,444 (2010 Census); 15,079 (2002 census); 17,473 (1989 Soviet census). The population of Gagino accounts for 31.3% of the district's total population.

== History ==
The district was established in 1929.

== Notable residents ==
- Lomakino, the birthplace of Andrey Vlasov (1901–1946), a Soviet Red Army general and collaborator with Nazi Germany during World War Two, is located within the district.
