= Boris Meissner =

German lawyer and social scientist

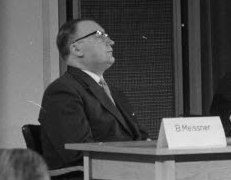
Boris Meissner at the Kiel Week 1963

Boris Meissner (10 August 1915 Pskov, Russian Empire – 10 September 2003 Cologne, Germany) was a German lawyer and social scientist, specializing in Soviet studies, international law and Eastern European history and politics.

== Life ==
Meissner was the son of Artur Meissner, a judge of Baltic German extraction, and spent his childhood in Pärnu, Estonia. He attended Tartu University, where he received a first degree in economics (Diplom rer. oec.) in 1935. He then studied law in Tartu until he had to leave Estonia during the repatriation of Baltic Germans (Umsiedlung der Deutsch-Balten) in 1939.

He was able to continue his studies at Posen University, where he also worked as research assistant for Erik von Sivers and Axel Freiherr von Freytag-Loringhoven. In the course of World War II he became an officer in the German Army, serving with Heeresgruppe Nord.

After the war he moved to Hamburg, where he became a research assistant to Rudolf von Laun at the University of Hamburg. From 1946 until 1953 he headed the Ostrecht (Eastern European law) desk at the Forschungsstelle für Völkerrecht und ausländisches öffentliches Recht of Hamburg University. In 1953 Meissner joined the Foreign Service of the Federal Republic of Germany. During his time at the Soviet desk, he was a member of the German delegation accompanying Konrad Adenauer on his visit to Moscow in September 1955 and the Four Power Conferences on Germany in Berlin (1954) and Geneva (1955; 1959). In 1956 he became First Secretary at the German Embassy in Moscow. Two years later he became head of the Research Department of the "Ostabteilung" in the German Foreign Office.

Having earned a doctorate at Hamburg University in 1955, Meissner was offered the chair in Eastern European Law, Politics and Social Studies at Kiel University in 1959. In 1964 he became director of the Institute for Eastern European Law at Cologne University, where he remained until his retirement in 1984.

Boris Meissner died 10 September 2003 aged 88 years in Cologne, Germany. Meissner was married to Irene Sieger in 1949 who died on December 11, 2017, in Cologne, Germany.

== Work ==
In 1961 Meissner initiated the foundation of the Federal Institute for Eastern European and International Studies (Bundesinstitut für Ostwissenschaftliche und Internationale Studien). He was its first president serving until 1965 and remained on the board for six more years. At the same time he advised the Foreign Office on policy towards the East Bloc, and later served as director of its advisory committee from 1972 - 1982.

A member of the Christian Democratic Union of Germany, Meissner was member of the foreign commission of the party's executive committee from 1970 to 1976. He continued to advise Chancellor Helmut Kohl on Eastern Europe in the 1980s and 1990s.

Apart from this, Meissner was president of the Göttinger Arbeitskreis, an association of scientists from the former German territories in the East, from 1965 - 2000.

== Publications ==
Meissner was a regular commentator on Soviet affairs for several scientific journals, e.g. Osteuropa (Eastern Europe) and Außenpolitik (Foreign Affairs). His expertise also covered east–west-relations and the German question. He was a renowned expert on Soviet institutions as well as the internal affairs of the ruling Communist Party of the Soviet Union. He followed the development of nationalist movements in the Soviet Union and the changes introduced by Mikhail Gorbachev from 1984 onwards. After the collapse of the Soviet Union he focused on the Baltic states.

His first book on the Soviet constitution was published in 1947, followed by numerous publications. In 1956 his doctoral thesis titled Soviet Intervention in the Baltic States and the Baltic Question in International Law (Die Sowjetische Intervention im Baltikum und die völkerrechtliche Problematik der baltischen Frage) was published.

== Selected works ==
- Die baltische Frage in der Weltpolitik In: Öffentliches Recht und Politik. Berlin : Duncker und Humblot, 1973
  - The Baltic Question in World Politics, The Baltic States in Peace and War (The Pennsylvania State University Press, 1978), 139-148
- Sowjetunion und Selbstbestimmungsrecht In: Dokumente zum Ostrecht, 0419-6015; Bd. 3 [ca1962]
- Partei, Staat und Nation in der Sowjetunion: ausgewählte Beiträge. Berlin: Duncker & Humblot, 1985 ISBN 3-428-05890-9
- The Communist Party of the Soviet Union: Party Leadership, Organization, and Ideology (1976) ISBN 0-8371-8461-4; ISBN 978-0-8371-8461-6
- The Soviet conception of coexistence and the Conference on Security and Cooperation in Europe (East-West relations). (1975) ASIN B0006D0RVI
- Die Sowjetunion im Umbruch: historische Hintergründe, Ziele und Grenzen der Reformpolitik Gorbatschows. Stuttgart: Deutsche Verlags-Anstalt, 1988 ISBN 3-421-06392-3
- Die russische Politik gegenüber der baltischen Region als Prüfstein für das Verhältnis Russlands zu Europa. In: Die Aussenpolitik der baltischen Staaten und die internationalen Beziehungen im Ostseeraum. Hrsg Boris Meissner, Dietrich A. Loeber, Cornelius Hasselblatt. Hamburg: Bibliotheca Baltica, 1994, S.466-504
- Auf dem Wege zur Wiedervereinigung Deutschlands und zur Normalisierung der deutsch-russischen Beziehungen: Ausgewählte Beiträge (Veröffentlichung / Göttinger Arbeitskreis) 2000 ISBN 3-8305-0102-1, ISBN 978-3-8305-0102-2

== Decorations ==
- Order of the Polar Star 1st Class (1977)
- Commander's Cross of the Order of Merit of the Federal Republic of Germany (1985)
- Grand Cross of the Order of the Cross of Terra Mariana (1995)
- Preußenschild of the Landsmannschaft Ostpreußen (1990)
- Honorary Doctorate of the University of Tartu (1996)
