= Lomakino, Nizhny Novgorod Oblast =

Lomakino Ломакино
- rural locality
- Interactive map of Lomakino
- Location of Lomakino Lomakino (Nizhny Novgorod Oblast)
- Coordinates: 55°13′16″N 45°07′30″E
- Country: Russia
- Federal subject: Nizhny Novgorod Oblast
- Administrative district: Gaginsky District
- Selsoviet: Pokrowski selsoviet
- Elevation: 147 m (482 ft)

Population (2010 Census)
  - Total: 332
  - Estimate (2010): 332 (0%)
- Time zone: UTC+3 (MSK)
- Postal code: 607853
- OKTMO ID: 22626432111

Lomakino (Russian: Ломакино) is a town with about 330 inhabitants in the Nizhny Novgorod Oblast of Russia.

== Geography ==
Lomakino is located 147 meter (482 feet) above sea level in the Pokrowski Selsoviet, Gaginsky District. The Pyana river flows to the northeast. The closest settlement is Khanineyewka, approximately three kilometers to the east. Approximately six kilometers to the west lies Gagino, which the district is named after. The closest major city is Nizhny Novgorod, which lies about 135 kilometers to the northwest.

== Demographics ==
Lomakino had 356 inhabitants in 2002, but the number dropped to 332 inhabitants in 2010.

== Notable people ==
- Andrey Vlasov (1901–1946), soviet general at the beginning of the Second World War who later defected to the Germans.
- Nikolai Saytsev (1922–1967), soviet marine engineer
