= Vasily Malyshkin =

Soviet general (1896–1946)

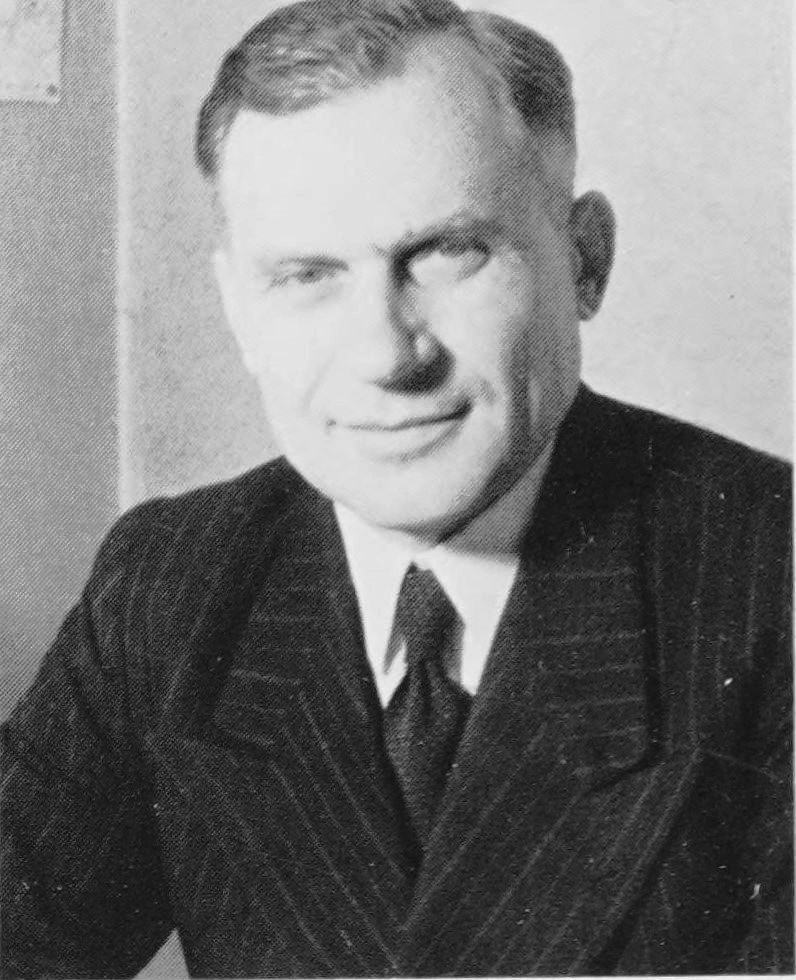
- Born: 26 December 1896; Markov mine, Donetsk, Russian Empire (today in Ukraine)
- Died: 1 August 1946 (aged 49) Butyrka Prison, Moscow, Soviet Union
- Cause of death: Execution by hanging
- Allegiance: Russian Empire (1916–1917); Soviet Union (1918–1941); Nazi Germany (1943–1944); Committee for the Liberation of the Peoples of Russia (1944–1945)
- Branch: Wehrmacht Propaganda (1943–1944)
- Rank: Major general
- Commands: 57th Special Corps
- Conflicts: World War I; Russian Civil War; World War II; Operation Typhoon
- Awards: Order of the Red Banner

Vasily Fedorovich Malyshkin (Russian: Васи́лий Фёдорович Малы́шкин; 26 December 1896 – 1 August 1946) was a Soviet major general during World War II. Following his capture during Operation Typhoon he defected to Nazi Germany becoming a leading member and propagandist for the Committee for the Liberation of the Peoples of Russia (KONR). In the aftermath of the German defeat he was captured by the American army, which in turn transferred him to the Soviet Union where he was executed for treason.

== Military career ==
Vasily Malyshkin was born at the Markov mine outside of Donetsk on 26 December 1896, into a family of ethnic Russians. From August 1908 until June 1916 he studied in a gymnasium in Novocherkassk. In October 1916, he enlisted as a private into the 252nd Reserve Regiment. In June 1917, he enrolled into the Chuhuiv Infantry School after the completion of which he returned to his old unit in the rank of Praporshchik. He joined the Red Army in April 1918. Initially leading a company of the 2nd Red Donetsk Regiment during the Russian Civil War. In May, he assumed command of a battalion and served as the deputy commander of the 334th Rifle Regiment. In September, he was promoted to the post of commander of the 319th Rifle Regiment. In February 1920, he was transferred to the 351st Rifle Regiment and in April to the 174th Rifle Regiment. During the course of the war he was wounded twice, later receiving the Order of the Red Banner and the Order of the Badge of Honour. In April 1921, he took over the 7th Caucasus Rifle Regiment. In October 1924, he enrolled into the Military Academy of the WPRA, graduating in June 1927. Afterwards he was appointed to the staff of the 33rd Rifle Division in Mogilev. In October 1930, he began teaching at the Vystrel course of infantry officer training in Moscow. In December 1933, he became the director of an infantry school in Kiev. In May 1935, he was appointed commander of the 99th Rifle Division. In December 1936, he was sent to Chita where he served as the deputy commander of the Transbaikal Military District. In August 1937, he was appointed commander of the 57th Special Corps in Ulan-Ude.

On 9 August 1938, Malyshkin was arrested by the NKVD, branded as an enemy of the people and accused of being a spy and a member of an anti–Soviet conspiracy. During the course of the investigation Malyshkin admitted to committing the aforementioned crimes. However when the case was taken to the Military Collegium of the Supreme Court of the Soviet Union he retracted his testimony. His accusers the commander of the Transbaikal Military District Mikhail Velikanov and his deputy Elkys had already been executed and therefore a cross-examination could not be performed. In October 1939, the trial was halted due to an absence of evidence and Malyshkin was acquitted. In December he returned to teaching in an infantry school. On 12 July 1941, he was appointed to the staff of the 19th Army in the rank of Kombrig. In early October, the 19th, 20th, 24th and 32nd Soviet Armies were encircled in the area of Vyazma during the course of the Operation Typhoon. A breakout attempt on 11 October failed and Malyshkin was apprehended by a German patrol during the night of 24 October. At the time of his capture Malyshkin wore civilian clothes and presented himself as private Volodin. Shortly before his capture Malyshkin was promoted to major general. He was taken to a prisoner of war camp in Vyazma where his true identity was revealed. During a round of questioning he provided outdated information and was sent to an Oflag in Smolensk. In January 1942, he was transferred to a POW camp in Fürstenberg on the Oder.

== Defection ==
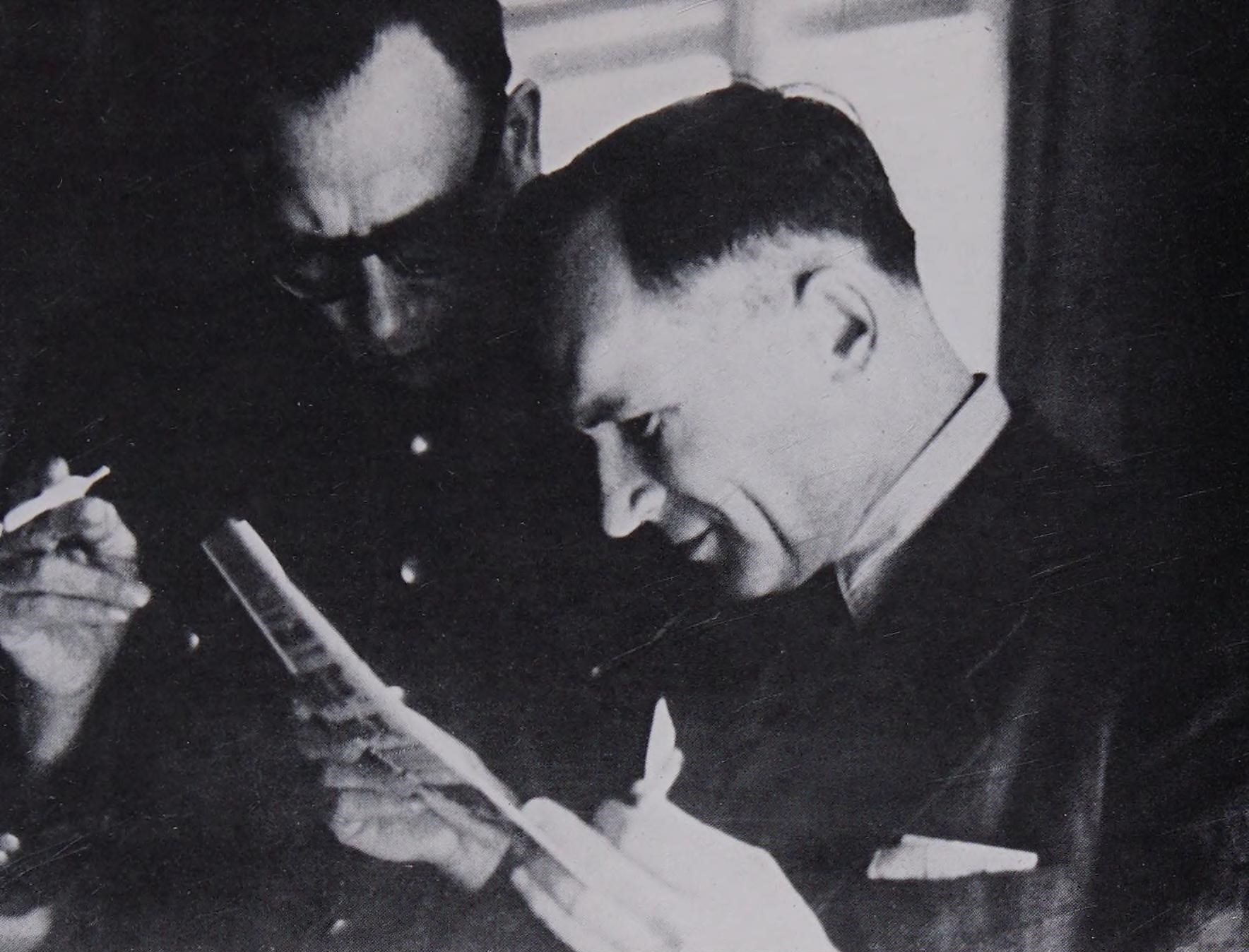
Vlasov and Malyshkin

In April 1942, Malyshkin defected to the Germans and began attending a course for collaborationist propagandists. In December, he met Wilfried Strik-Strikfeldt who aided in his transfer to a central propaganda bureau in Berlin where he collaborated with Andrey Vlasov. Together they created the Committee for the Liberation of the Peoples of Russia (KONR), an Axis sponsored Russian anti-communist organization intent on overthrowing the regime of Joseph Stalin. On 24 January 1943, Malyshkin passed secret information on the Soviet Union's prewar military plans regarding Germany to a German foreign ministry official. In March, he became the editor of the Zarya newspaper and organized the first Anti-Bolshevik Congress of former Red Army Soldiers in Dabendorf. In March 1944, he toured Russian Liberation Army units in southern France with propaganda lectures. In November, he became a member of KONR's presidium, leading its organizational department. On 6 February 1945, he evacuated from Berlin to Karlsbad due to the approach of Allied troops. On 29 April, he initiated talks with an intelligence officer of the United States Army Europe, requesting that KONR's leadership be granted political asylum in the U.S.A. On 9 May, he was detained together with other KONR members by the American army. On 25 March 1946, he was transferred to the Soviet authorities in handcuffs. He was then taken to Moscow where he was questioned by SMERSH. On 18 April, he pleaded guilty to the charge of treason. On 1 August, he was hanged in Butyrka prison.
