= Why I Have Taken Up the Struggle Against Bolshevism =

Open letter by Andrey Vlasov

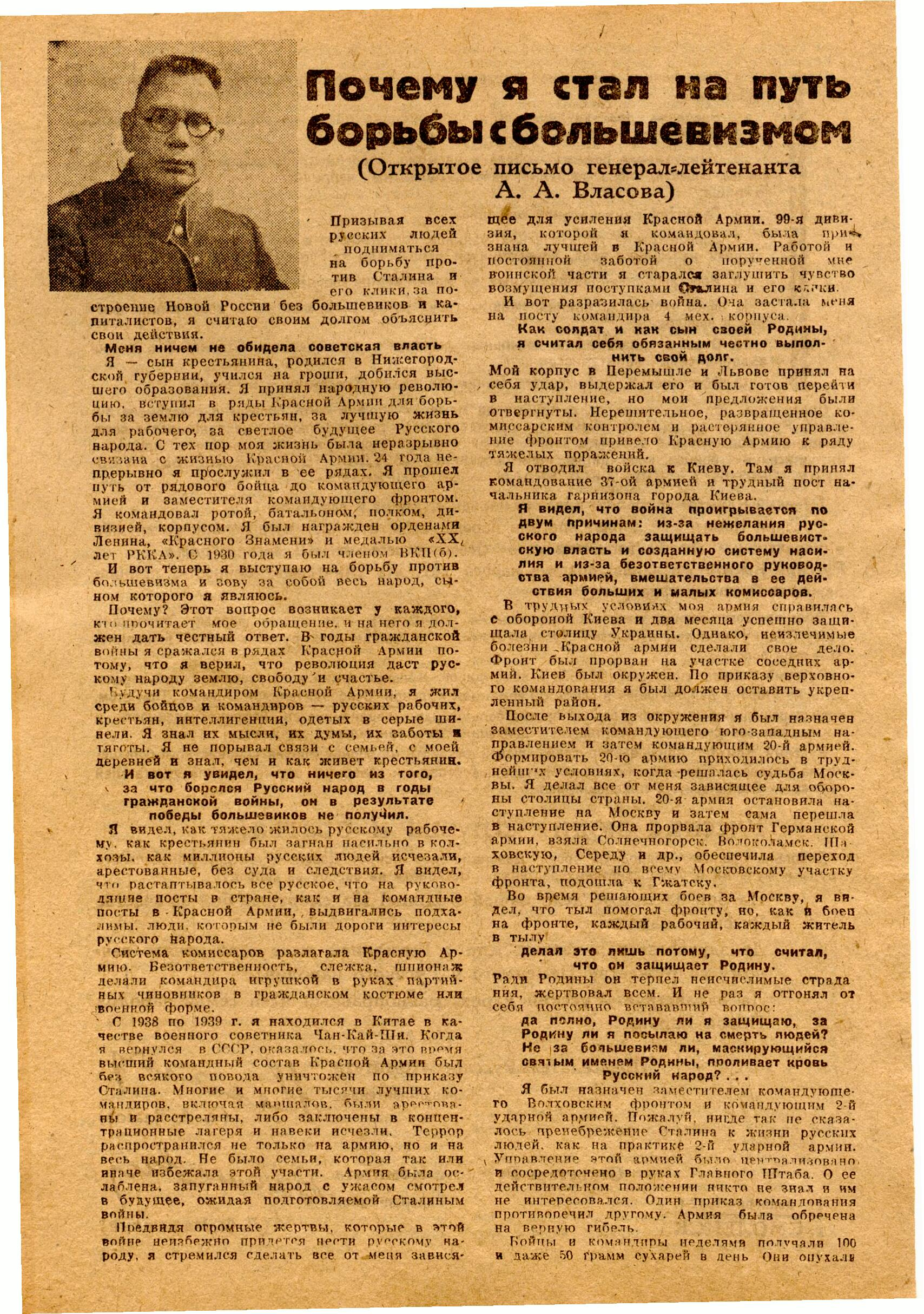
- The first page of the open letter
- Original title: Почему я стал на путь борьбы с большевизмом
- Presented: March 3, 1943
- Author: Andrey Vlasov
- Media type: Open letter

Why I Have Taken Up the Struggle Against Bolshevism (Russian: «Почему я стал на путь борьбы с большевизмом») is a two-page open letter by Andrey Vlasov, a Russian lieutenant general and the commander of the Russian Liberation Army, published in 1943 to explain his opposition to Bolshevism.

After the twenty-three years' service in the Soviet military, Vlasov changed his allegiance during World War II to collaborate with Nazi Germany. According to historian Robert Service, Vlasov was outraged when Joseph Stalin denied him permission to retreat in time from an unavoidable encirclement of the 2nd Shock Army. In June 1942 Vlasov refused to be airlifted for evacuation to the rear and chose to stay with his men. Having been captured by the Germans in the same month, Vlasov published his open letter in the newspaper Zarya on March 3, 1943. For his speeches about future independent Russia Vlasov was placed by Germans under house arrest.

== Background ==
Vlasov was drafted into the Red Army in 1919. Having attended an infantry tactics course, he became a battalion commander. In 1930 Vlasov became a tactics instructor. Several years later Vlasov was entrusted with command of the 11th Infantry Regiment, that shortly afterwards was officially recognized as the best in the Kiev Military District. In 1939 Vlasov became the chief military adviser to Chiang Kai-shek, who awarded Vlasov the Golden Order of the Dragon. Upon his return to the Soviet Union, Vlasov was appointed the commander of the 99th Infantry Division, which he retrained and reformed, bringing it out of disarray. For this work Vlasov received the Order of Lenin and a gold watch.

During World War II, Vlasov failed to defend Kiev, but successfully recaptured Solnechnogorsk and Volokolamsk from Germans. In that period, American journalist Larry LeSueur, who interviewed Vlasov, and the French journalist Ève Curie both mentioned Vlasov's popularity among soldiers.

== Contents ==
Vlasov begins his letter with the commitment to answer the question, why he had started the struggle against Bolshevism. Vlasov explains, that he fought in the ranks of the Soviet army because he believed that "the revolution would give the Russian people land, freedom and happiness", but he "realized that the victory of the Bolsheviks had brought the Russian people none of the things it had fought for during the Civil War years". Criticizing Stalin, Vlasov expresses his opposition to collectivization, political commissars and the purge of the Soviet army command in the 1930s.

In Vlasov's opinion, "Bolshevism has fenced off the Russian people from Europe by an impenetrable wall". As the commander of the defeated 2nd Shock Army, Vlasov wrote that "perhaps nowhere else did the Stalin's disregard for the life of the Russian people manifest itself as much, as in the practice of the 2nd Shock Army". According to Vlasov, "the soldiers and commanders received 100 or even 50 grams of rusks a day, swelled up from hunger and many became incapable of moving through the swamps to which they had been sent on the direct orders of the high command". "With a full sense of responsibility to the motherland, the people and history for the actions" he commits, Vlasov calls people to fight and "build a new Russia". The letter emphasizes several points in bolded font and ends with the belief, that the Russian people "will find the strength to unite in the time of severe calamities, overthrow the hateful yoke and build a new state in which they will find happiness".

== See also ==
- Smolensk Declaration
- Prague Manifesto
