= Andrey Vlasov =

Soviet Russian general and politician (1901–1946)

- Андрéй Влáсов
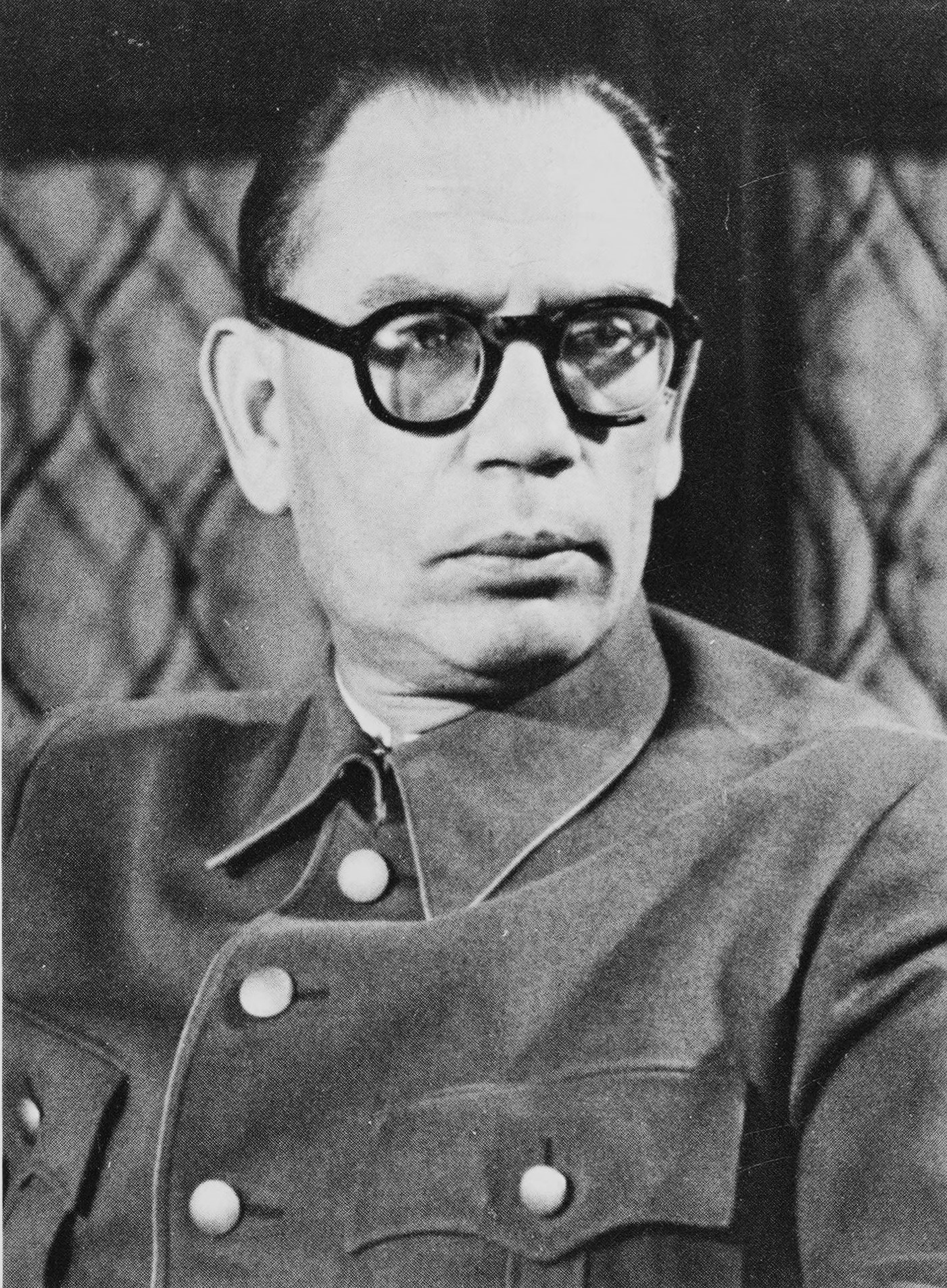

Chairman of the Committee for the Liberation of the Peoples of Russia
- In office 14 November 1944 – May 1945
- Preceded by: Position established
- Succeeded by: Mikhail Meandrov (acting)

Personal details
- Born: Andrey Andreyevich Vlasov; Андрéй Андрéевич Влáсов; September 14, 1901 Lomakino, Nizhny Novgorod Governorate, Russian Empire
- Died: August 1, 1946 (aged 44) Moscow, Russian SFSR, Soviet Union
- Cause of death: Execution by hanging
- Party: All-Union Communist Party (Bolsheviks) (1930–1942); Committee for the Liberation of the Peoples of Russia (1944–1946)
- Awards: Order of the Red Banner^{1}; Order of Lenin^{1}; ^{1}All Soviet awards revoked after defection to Germany.; Ostvolk Medal in gold with swords

Military service
- Allegiance: Russian SFSR (1919–1922); Soviet Union (1922–1942); Committee for the Liberation of the Peoples of Russia (1945)
- Years of service: 1920–1942; 1945
- Rank: Lieutenant general
- Commands: 99th Rifle Division; 20th Army; 2nd Shock Army; Russian Liberation Army
- Battles/wars: Russian Civil War; Second Sino-Japanese War; Second World War; Eastern Front; Battle of Brody; Battle of Kiev; Battle of Moscow; Battle of Lyuban

Andrey Andreyevich Vlasov (Russian: Андре́й Андре́евич Вла́сов, 14 September [O.S. 1 September] 1901 – August 1, 1946) was a Soviet Russian Red Army general. During the Axis-Soviet campaigns of World War II, he fought against the Wehrmacht in the Battle of Moscow and later was captured attempting to lift the siege of Leningrad in 1942. After his capture, he defected and collaborated with Nazi Germany. He nominally headed the Russian Liberation Army (Russkaya osvoboditel'naya armiya, ROA), also becoming the political leader of the Russian collaborationist anti-Soviet movement.

Initially, this army existed only on paper and was used by Germans to goad Red Army troops to surrender, while any political and military activities were officially forbidden to him by the Nazis after his visits to the occupied territory; only in November 1944 did Heinrich Himmler, aware of Germany's shortage of manpower, arrange for Vlasov's formations, composed of Soviet prisoners of war as armed forces of Committee for the Liberation of the Peoples of Russia, a political organisation headed by Vlasov. While for the Nazis the ROA was a mere propaganda weapon, Vlasov and his associates attempted to create an armed political movement independent of the Nazi control that would present an anti-Stalinist program described by Robert Conquest as democratic, while attempting to avoid Nazi antisemitism and chauvinism, with "completing the Revolution" of 1917 being the ultimate goal of the movement.

In January 1945, Vlasov headed the army as it was declared that it would be no longer a part of the Wehrmacht. At the war's end, the 1st division of ROA aided the May 1945 Prague uprising against the Germans. Vlasov and the ROA were captured by Soviet forces. Vlasov was tortured, and hanged for treason after a secret trial. After his death, his figure and his movement became objects of various narratives in memory politics and historiography.

== Early career ==
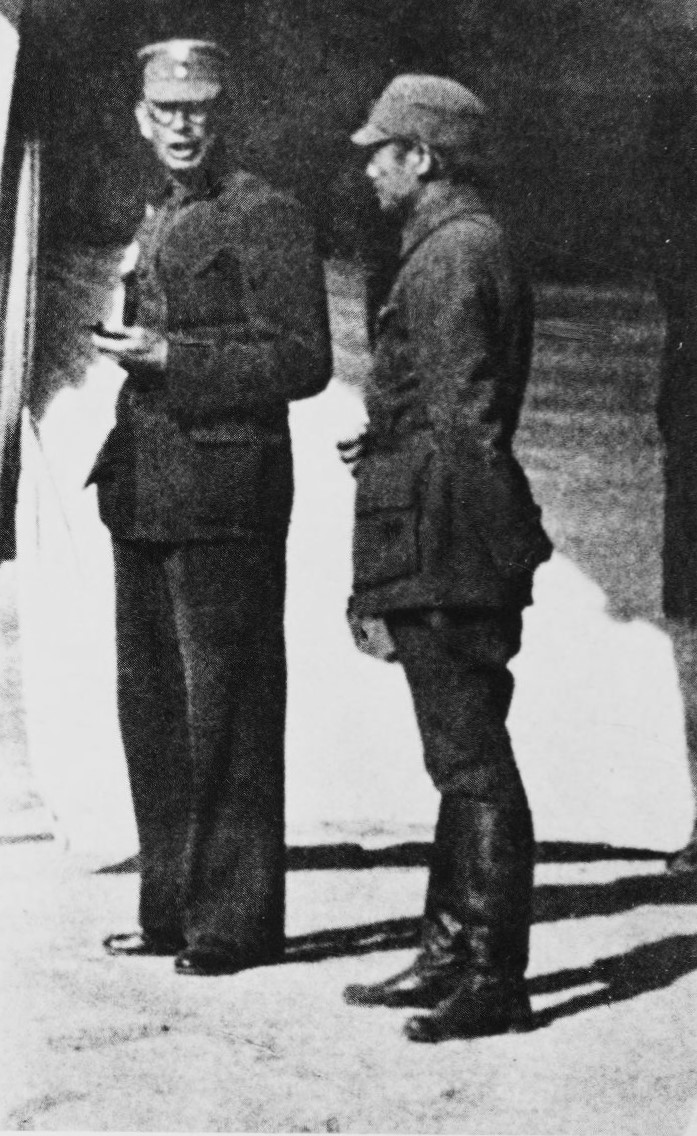
Vlasov during his service in China

Born in Lomakino, Nizhny Novgorod Governorate, Russian Empire, Vlasov was originally a student at a Russian Orthodox seminary. He quit the study of divinity after the Russian Revolution, briefly studying agricultural sciences instead, and in 1919 joined the Red Army. He fought in the southern theatre in Ukraine, the Caucasus, and the Crimea during the Russian Civil War, including against the White forces of Anton Denikin and Pyotr Wrangel, and the anarchist army of Nestor Makhno. He distinguished himself as an officer and gradually rose through the ranks of the Red Army. In the 1920s and early 1930s he was a company, battalion, and regimental commander, and graduated from an infantry officer course. He was also an instructor at the Frunze Military Academy.

Vlasov joined the Communist Party in 1930. Sent to China in 1938, he acted as a military adviser to Chiang Kai-shek until November 1939. From February to May 1939 he was the advisor to Yan Xishan, the governor of Shanxi. Vlasov was also the chief of staff to the head of the Soviet military mission, General Aleksandr Cherepanov. He received a military decoration from Chiang and a watch from his wife, Madame Chiang Kai-shek, which were both taken from him after he returned to the USSR. Upon his return, Vlasov served in several assignments before being given command of the 99th Rifle Division. After just nine months under Vlasov's leadership, and an inspection by Semyon Timoshenko, the division was recognized as one of the best divisions in the Army in 1940. Timoshenko presented Vlasov with an inscribed gold watch, as he "found the 99th the best of all". The historian John Erickson says of Vlasov at this point that [he] "was an up-and-coming man". In 1940, Vlasov was promoted to major general, and on June 22, 1941, when the Germans and their allies invaded the Soviet Union, Vlasov was commanding the 4th Mechanized Corps.

As a lieutenant general, he commanded the 37th Army near Kiev and escaped encirclement. He then played an important role in the defense of Moscow, as his 20th Army counterattacked and retook Solnechnogorsk. Vlasov's picture was printed (along with those of other Soviet generals) in the newspaper Pravda as that of one of the "defenders of Moscow". Vlasov was decorated on January 24, 1942, with the Order of the Red Banner for his efforts in the defence of Moscow. Vlasov was ordered to relieve the ailing commander Klykov after the Second Shock Army had been encircled. After this success, Vlasov was put in command of the 2nd Shock Army of the Volkhov Front and ordered to lead the attempt to lift the Siege of Leningrad—the Lyuban-Chudovo Offensive Operation of January–April 1942.

On January 7, 1942, Vlasov's army had spearheaded the Lyuban offensive operation to break the Leningrad encirclement. Planned as a combined operation between the Volkhov and Leningrad Fronts on a 30 km frontage, other armies of the Leningrad Front (including the 54th) were supposed to participate at scheduled intervals in this operation. Crossing the Volkhov River, Vlasov's army was successful in breaking through the German 18th Army's lines and penetrated 70–74 km deep inside the German rear area. However, the other armies (the Volkhov Front's 4th, 52nd, and 59th Armies, 13th Cavalry Corps, and 4th and 6th Guards Rifle Corps, as well as the 54th Army of the Leningrad Front) failed to exploit Vlasov's advances and provide the required support, and Vlasov's army became stranded. Permission to retreat was refused. With the counter-offensive in May 1942, the Second Shock Army was finally allowed to retreat, but by now, too weakened, it was surrounded and in June 1942 virtually annihilated during the final breakout at Myasnoi Bor.

== German prisoner ==
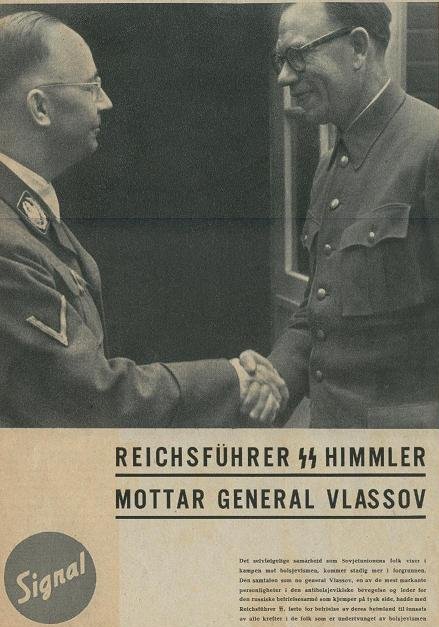
Vlasov and Himmler on the cover of Norwegian Signal, 1943

After Vlasov's army was surrounded, he himself was offered an escape by aeroplane. The general refused and hid in German-occupied territory; ten days later, on July 12, 1942, a local farmer exposed him to the Germans. Vlasov's opponent and captor, general Georg Lindemann, interrogated him about the surrounding of his army and details of battles, then "had Vlasov imprisoned in occupied Vinnytsia."

While in prison, Vlasov met Captain Wilfried Strik-Strikfeldt, a Baltic German who was attempting to foster a Russian Liberation Movement. Strik-Strikfeldt had circulated memos to this effect in the Wehrmacht. Strik-Strikfeldt, who had been a participant in the White movement during the Russian Civil War, persuaded Vlasov to become involved in aiding the German advance against the rule of Joseph Stalin and Bolshevism. With Lieutenant Colonel Vladimir Boyarsky, Vlasov wrote a memo shortly after his capture to the German military leaders suggesting cooperation between anti-Stalinist Russians and the German Army.

== Defection ==
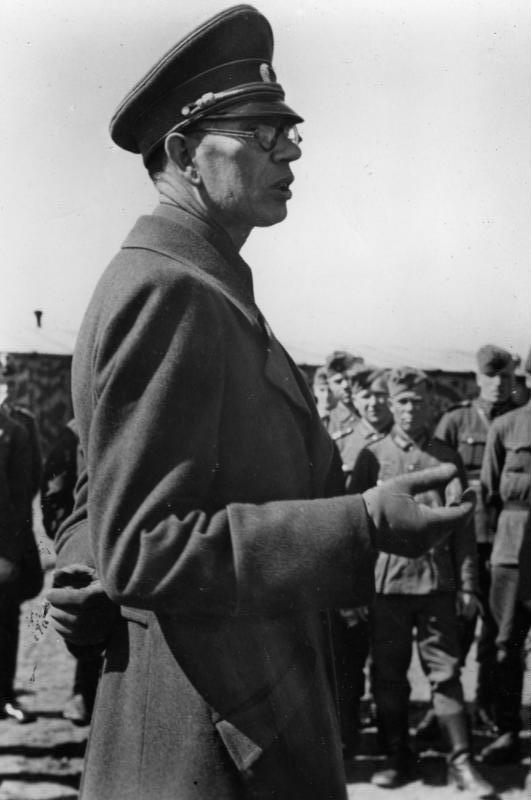
Vlasov talking to recruits on November 18, 1944

Vlasov was taken to Berlin under the control of the Wehrmacht Propaganda Department. While there, he and other Soviet officers began drafting plans for the creation of a Russian provisional government and the recruitment of a Russian army of liberation under Russian command. In the spring of 1943, Vlasov wrote an anti-Bolshevik leaflet known as the "Smolensk Proclamation", which was dropped from aircraft by the millions on Soviet forces and Soviet-controlled soil. In March of the same year, Vlasov also published an open letter titled "Why I Have Taken Up the Struggle Against Bolshevism". Even though no Russian Liberation Army yet existed, the Nazi propaganda department issued Russian Liberation Army patches to Russian volunteers and tried to use Vlasov's name in order to encourage defections. Several hundred thousand former Soviet citizens served in the German army wearing this patch, but never under Vlasov's own command.

Vlasov was permitted to make several trips to German-occupied Soviet Union: most notably, to Pskov, Russia, where Russian pro-German volunteers paraded. The populace's reception of Vlasov was mixed. While in Pskov, Vlasov dealt himself a nearly fatal political blow by referring to the Germans as mere "guests" during a speech, which Hitler found belittling. Vlasov was even put under house arrest and threatened with being handed over to the Gestapo. Despondent about his mission, Vlasov threatened to resign and return to the POW camp, but was dissuaded at the last minute by his confidants. According to Varlam Shalamov and his tale The Last Battle of Major Pugachov, Vlasov emissaries lectured to the Russian prisoners of war, explaining to them that their government had declared them all traitors, and that escaping was pointless. As Vlasov proclaimed, even if the Soviets succeeded, Stalin would send them to Siberia.

== Vlasov Movement ==
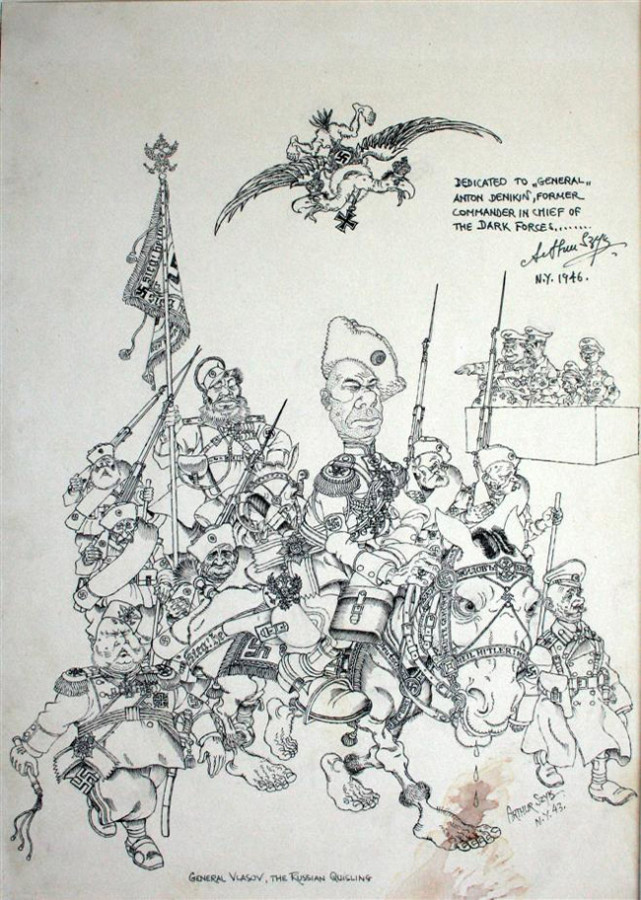
Caricature "General Vlasov, the Russian Quisling" (1943) by Arthur Szyk depicts Vlasov as a far-right reactionary surrounded by the White Guards; the drawing is dedicated to the leader of the Russian Whites Anton Denikin, known for Jewish pogroms

The creation of a political movement behind Vlasov and the Russian collaboration became a result of the conflicts within the Nazi Party and the Nazi bureaucracy. While Hitler and the supporters of the Generalplan Ost adhered to the idea of the colonization of the Untermenschen and denied any cooperation with the population of the USSR, Alfred Rosenberg proposed the creation of monoethnic nation-states as satellites of the Third Reich ruled by local nationalist collaborators. Hitler rejected this project, but the Soviet defectors were used by the Wehrmacht Propaganda Department. Eventually Hitler agreed to use the Soviet defectors for propaganda purposes. As the reports of the Osttruppen defecting to the Soviet partisans reached Hitler, he demanded that all the units be disbanded, and the men sent to the mines and factories, but this order wasn't executed due to the resistance of the OKW. After the 20 July plot, the Eastern troops were handed to the SS, and as Hitler weakened due to physical conditions, Himmler found possible the creation of a collaborationist political organisation with its army.

After defection, Vlasov became the leading collaborator with Nazi Germany and the figurehead of the so-called "Russian Liberation Movement". Its stated goal was the overthrow of Stalinism with the aid of the Nazis; the ROA was thought to be the armed force of the movement. Although the White emigres participated in its formation, the Soviet defectors eventually became its leaders and formulated its political positions. The Committee for the Liberation of the Peoples of Russia (KONR) became the political body of this movement, and its positions were described in the Prague Manifesto of the Committee in November 1944.

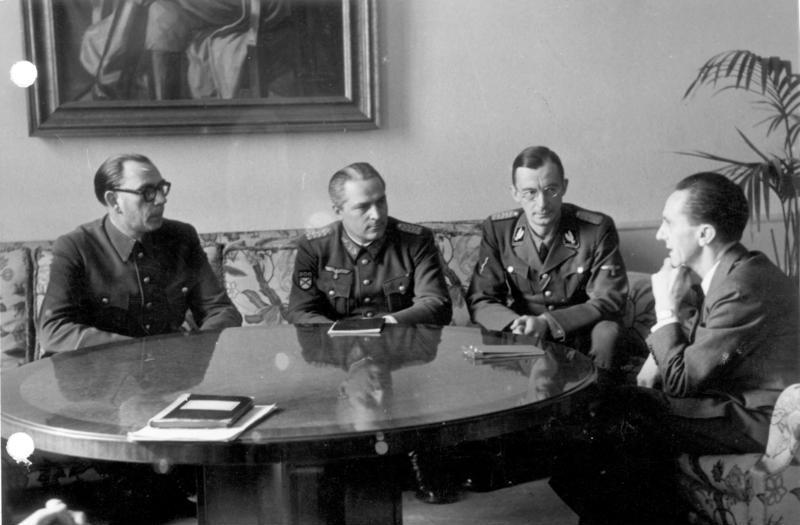
Vlasov (left) and Gen. Zhilenkov (center) meeting Joseph Goebbels (February 1945)

As Vlasov became the undisputed leader of the movement, it became referred to as "the Vlasov Movement", while his Manifesto calls it the "Liberation Movement of the Peoples of Russia", underlying its multinationality. Although at first Vlasov hoped for an open co-operation of his movement and the Nazis, during his tour at the occupied territories, he emphasised that National Socialism could not be imposed on Russia, and that "a foreign coat [would] not fit a Russian." In his nationalist speeches, Vlasov promoted the idea of equal partnership with Germany and the idea of an independent Russia; his speeches angered Himmler, and in response, Wilhelm Keitel issued an order that Vlasov must be returned to POW camp and that his name henceforth should be used only for propaganda purposes. Rosenberg stopped supporting Vlasov, but he was placed under virtual house arrest in Dahlem instead of being sent to the POW camp. Disappointed, Vlasov said several times that he would return to the camp, but was dissuaded by his associates, namely Malyshkin and Wilfried Strik-Strikfeldt.

Ideologically, the Vlasov movement was between the Russian nationalism of the National Alliance of Russian Solidarists, an organisation of far-right origins which collaborated with the Nazis (but the members of which were repressed by Gestapo in 1943 and 1944 so Vlasov had to ask Himmler to free them), as its ideologues surrounded Vlasov, and social democratic views of the other Russian POWs in Germany. Typical anti-communist literature on Vlasov glosses over documented Nazi sympathies of the movement. The Vlasov movement run press organs and camps to train Russian propagandists that praised National Socialism, and the democratic veneer seen in the declarations of ROA was largely made in attempt to make the movement palatable to the Western powers.

Some of Vlasov's close associates like Milety Zykov, a Soviet journalist of Jewish origins, described themselves as Marxists, Zykov was also described as a Bukharinist. Despite being captured by the Nazi secret police and killed, ostensibly for his Jewish origins and for his views, before the formation of the Committee for the Liberation of the Peoples of Russia and the creation of its Manifesto, the political organization of the Vlasovites, Zykov was a major ideologue of the Vlasov army and participated in writing of the other Vlasovite program documents. The Vlasovites opposed their programs, the Smolensk Declaration, Vlasov's open letter "Why I Decided to Fight against Bolshevism", the Prague Manifesto of the KONR and Bloknot Propagandista (an important document which was written by rather minor members of the KONR as open for discussion and was not recognized as an official program), both to the Western capitalism and Stalinism, which was called by the word "Bolshevism" and described in the Manifesto not as socialism but as "state capitalism", and proclaimed their devotion to "completing the Revolution" of 1917 without distinguishing the February Revolution and the October Revolution, and to ideals of either a "Russia without Bolsheviks and Capitalists" (Smolensk Declaration and the open letter), or a welfare state (Bloknot Propagandista); the influence of the NTS on the Manifesto is seen in the description of the future system of Russia as a "national-labour" system, some of Vlasov's generals joined the NTS. All of these documents granted the basic democratic freedoms and rights, including the right of the nations to self-determination and to separate from Russia and did not contain antisemitic remarks and invectives; Bloknot Propagandista also contained an attempt in critique of Marxism and denied both internationalism and national chauvinism. However, antisemitic remarks were made in one of the speeches of Vasily Malyshkin in 1943 and in Georgi Zhilenkov's interview to the Völkischer Beobachter; Vlasov was critical of such remarks and replied to the Nazi concerns that "the Jewish question" "was an internal Russian problem and would be dealt with after they [the ROA] had accomplished the primary aim of overthrowing the existing regime"; however, antisemitism frequently appeared in the pro-Vlasov Nazi and collaborationist newspapers issued before the formation of KONR, including the ones edited by Zykov, often in form of articles reprinted from the Völkischer Beobachter with the citation of the source. The program documents were also written as a compromise with Nazism to various extents: the Smolensk Declaration included some pro-Nazi points ("Germany was not fighting the war against the Russian people and their homeland but merely against Bolshevism"), and the Manifesto included a number of criticisms of the Western Allies as a compromise with Himmler's insistence to add antisemitic points.

The Nazis were suspicious of Vlasov, his organisation and his ideological position, and the Gestapo warned about the possibility of the Vlasovites betraying the Reich. The suspicions and criticism of the Vlasovites from the Reich officials was summarised in a document by the Ministry of Propaganda official Eberhard Taubert who described his concerns about the movement being "not National Socialist": "It is significant that it does not fight Jewry, that the Jewish Question is not recognized as such at all"; instead it presented "a watered-down infusion of liberal and Bolshevik ideologies", and Taubert described the concern with "strong Anglophile sympathies" and it "toying with the idea of a possible change of course" while not "feel[ing] bound to Germany".

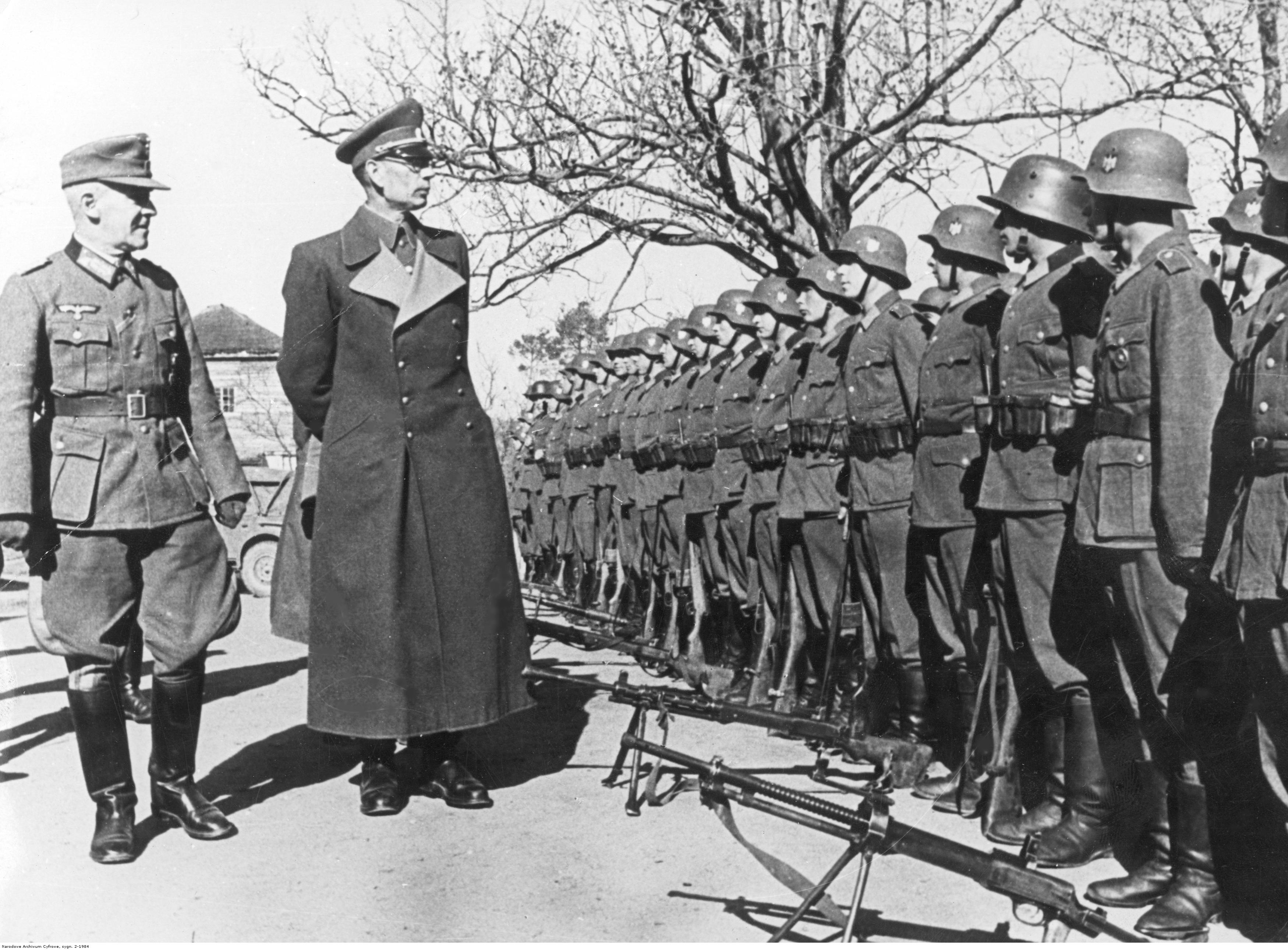
Vlasov some time after his defection

The head of the SS had a negative attitude towards Vlasov and the idea of arming Russian formations. In late 1942, he told another SS official who was based in Minsk that Russian collaborators should not be promised a national state and only a liberation from Bolshevism and possibly better living standards. He oversaw the creation of the SS Division Galicia in October 1943 from Ukrainian volunteers, but that same month he said that Vlasov made him "genuinely anxious." Himmler later noted that there were Wehrmacht officers who wanted to give Vlasov a million-man army, and speculated that it could turn against Germany in the future. Himmler did not want Vlasov to even be used for propaganda and on another occasion said that Vlasov's ideology "must be intellectually totally annihilated among us." Hitler had similar concerns, having said in June 1943 that Vlasov was not needed, because Germany "would never build up a Russian army."

It was not until Germany's position was weakened in the spring of 1944 that Himmler began changing his mind, with the encouragement of Gunter d'Alquen and others, and decided to meet with Vlasov. Their meeting was scheduled for the evening of 20 July 1944, but was postponed by the assassination attempt against Hitler until 16 September 1944. When it happened, Himmler promised Vlasov several Russian divisions. Two began to be formed, the 600th Infantry Division in November 1944 and the 650th Infantry Division in January 1945, respectively. He also approved the creation of the Committee for the Liberation of the Peoples of Russia (KONR). Earlier, in the summer of 1944 Vlasov, who had been depressed after the first few years of failing to get German support for the Russian Liberation Movement, was sent to an SS recovery center in Ruhpolding that was run by Heidi Bielenberg, the widow of an SS officer. Several weeks after meeting they decided to get married, even though neither one spoke each other's language and Vlasov probably knew that his first wife was still alive in the Soviet Union. This may have been done under the pressure of the SS. According to the SS liaison officer assigned to Vlasov's staff, the idea for the marriage came mainly from the SS widow, because she liked the idea of her becoming the "first lady" of a future Russian state.

== Commander of the ROA ==
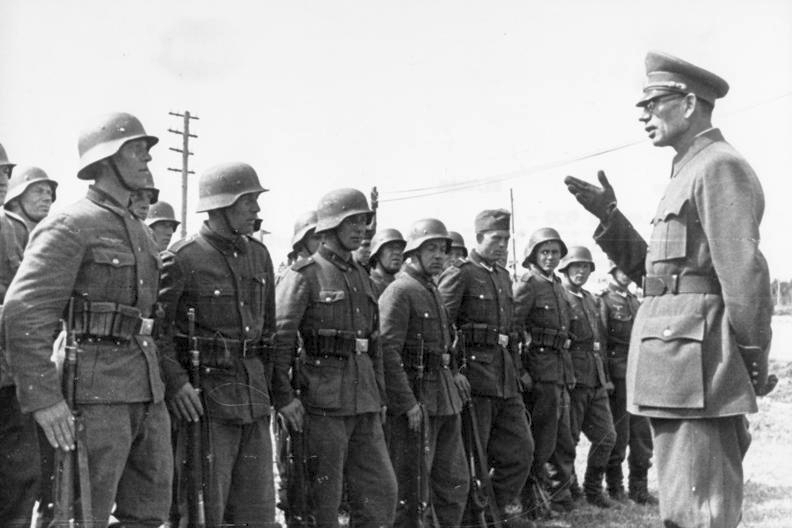
Vlasov with ROA soldiers

The only combat of the ROA against the Red Army took place on February 11, 1945, on the river Oder in Operation April Weather. It was carried out by the 1st Division led by General Sergei Bunyachenko. After three days of battle against overwhelming forces, the division was forced to retreat and marched southward to Prague, in German-controlled Bohemia. In March 1945, Bunyachenko started disobeying the commands of the Wehrmacht; eventually Ferdinand Schörner (and later Rudolf Toussaint) threatened to use armed force against the ROA. Vlasov reprimanded Bunyachenko during their meeting with Schörner in assertion of his loyalty, but privately granted Bunyachenko complete independence in sign of his approval while himself taking care of the rest two incomplete divisions.

During the Prague uprising, the officers of the 1st Division, Bunyachenko and Vlasov discussed whether the division should help the insurgents. Vlasov spoke against joining the uprising, but his position was not supported by the others, and the ROA troops joined the uprising. Two days later, the 1st Division was forced to leave Prague as Communist Czech partisans began arresting ROA soldiers in order to hand them over to the Soviet Union. Vlasov and the rest of his forces, trying to evade the Red Army, attempted to head west to surrender to the Allies in the closing days of the war in Europe.

== Capture by Soviet forces, trial, and execution ==
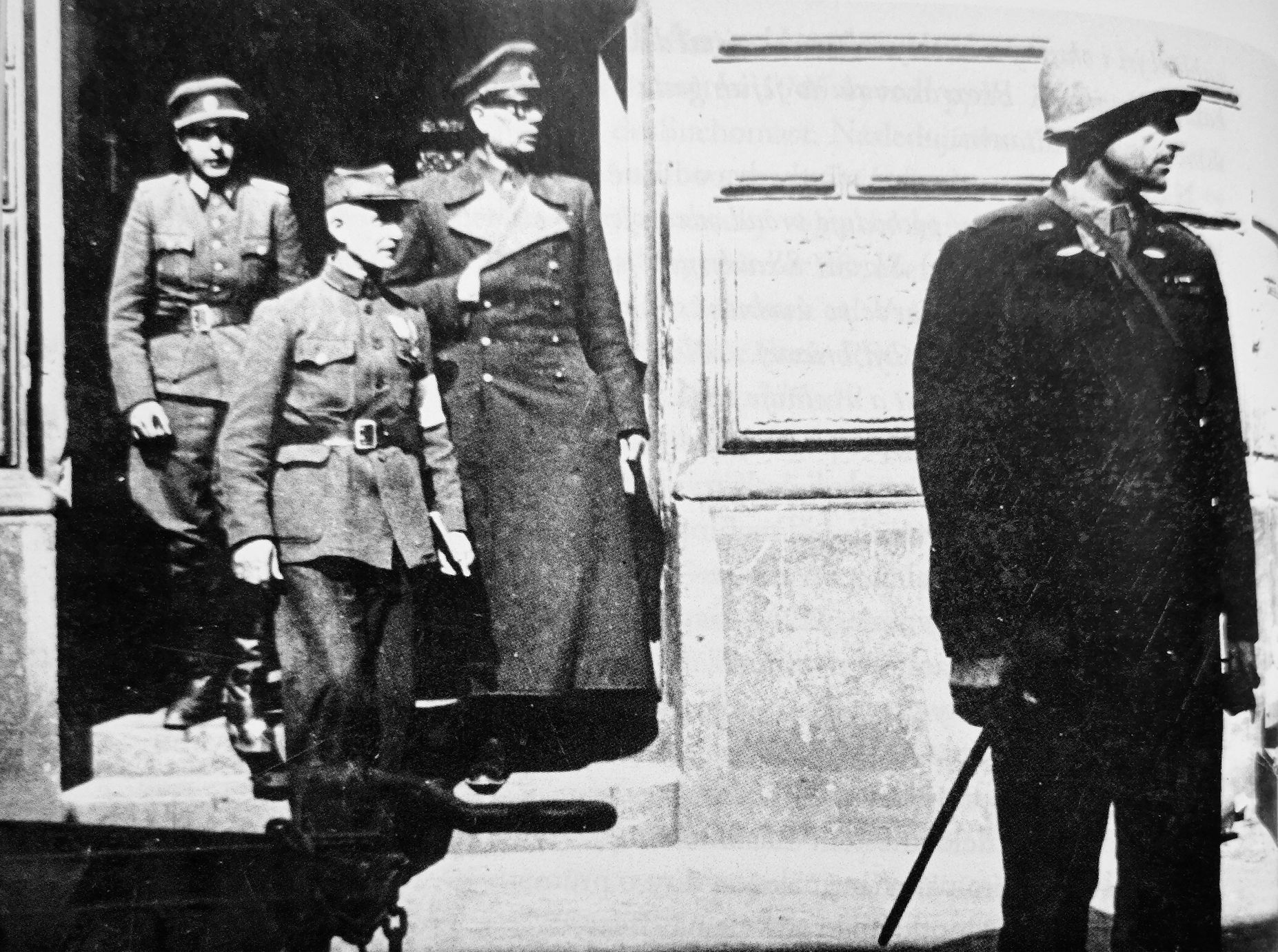
Vlasov leaving the headquarters of the 16th Armored Division of the US Army in Plzeň (May 9, 1945)

Vlasov's division, commanded by General Sergei Bunyachenko, was captured 40 kilometres (25 mi) southeast of Plzeň by the Soviet 25th Tank Corps, after their attempt to surrender to US troops was rejected. Captain M. I. Yakushev of the 162nd Tank Brigade had Vlasov dragged out of his car, put on a tank and driven straight to the Soviet 13th Army HQ. Vlasov was then transported from the 13th Army HQ to Marshal Ivan Konev's command post in Dresden, and from there sent immediately to Moscow.

Vlasov was confined in Lubyanka prison where he was interrogated. A closed trial was held, beginning on 30 July 1946 and was presided over by Viktor Abakumov who sentenced him and eleven other senior officers from his army to death for high treason. Vlasov was executed by hanging on 1 August 1946. His execution was among the last death sentences in the Soviet Union carried out by hanging, after which executions were conducted only by shooting.

== Legacy ==
=== Historiography and memory politics ===
==== 20th century ====
In the USSR, the figure of Vlasov was villainized because of the need to defend the official myth of the Great Patriotic War, which was "created and assiduously supported as a pillar of state legitimacy and national culture in the USSR". However, in the emigration and later in the post-Soviet Russia, he and his movement became objects of various narratives.

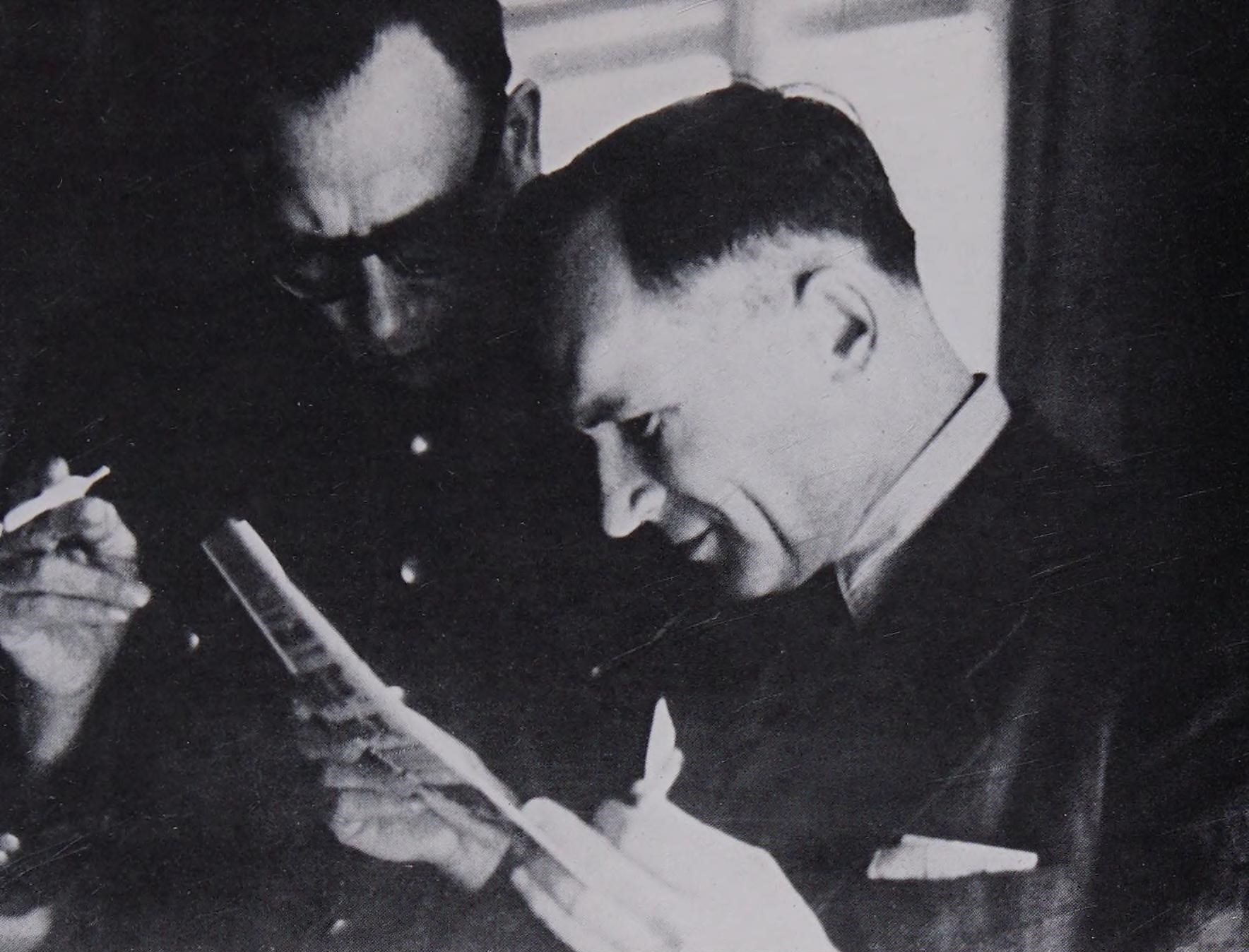
Vlasov and Vasily Malyshkin

The first narrative in the emigration was set up by the former White Guards who served in the ROA or supported Vlasov, although they were a minority in the ROA and had conflicts with the Vlasovites, since the Whites were suspicious of the former Soviet soldiers and sometimes called them "Reds", while Vasily Malyshkin, one of Vlasov's closest associates, charged that the White movement, described by him as a movement of conservative gentry, had remained distant from realities of the USSR, and lacked "any progressive principles", ranging from apoliticism to reaction, and through seeking a "restoration of the old noble-landowning system" did nothing but legitimizing the Bolsheviks. The Vlasovites and the Whites had very different world views, partially because for the Whites struggle against the USSR and collaboration with the Nazis was not a means of survival, partially because the Vlasovites who were grown on the Soviet culture saw conservatism of the Whites as backward-looking and irrelevant, and Malyshkin suggested that the conflict between the Whites and the Vlasovites was rooted in different social backgrounds and class origins and worldviews. However, after the war, the Whites who participated in the Vlasov Movement sought to connect it with their cause: for example, Constantine Kromiadi wrote that the Vlasov Movement was a part of the "Christian war of the 30 years of the liberation movement against communism". The White rightists sought to "offset the opprobrium of collaboration with Germany by viewing World War Two through the prism of the Russian Civil War and the Tsarist period" and alleged that the Soviets, not the collaborators, were the real national traitors. Such ideas were not popular among the majority of the surviving Vlasovites, but for a few years the Whites became their new leaders and even established Monarchist Vlasovite organizations, since they were naturalized citizens of European states and had more chances of surviving, also because of "aristocratic cohesion" and such benefits as knowledge of foreign languages, while the surviving Vlasovites were in danger of being forcibly repatriated to the Soviet Union, with the subsequent punishment for treason. The Whites attempted to unite the whole emigration and get funding by the CIA, and the latter could help Vlasovites survive. However, the Whites failed to get the attention of the CIA, and their narrative was soon rejected. However, it would reemerge in post-Soviet Russia.

To get the interest of the U.S. military intelligence, the post-war Vlasovites stressed the anti-Communist nature of their movement. However, the new narrative was left-wing, being constructed by the Menshevik intellectual and historian Boris Nicolaevsky, who after visiting DP camps came to a belief that the Vlasov Movement was democratic and even anti-Nazi to some extent. His narrative was somewhat closer to the truth, as he, unlike the Whites, could cite Vlasovite documents, like the Prague Manifesto of the KONR. However, it was incomplete and still had some factual errors. Nikolaevsky described the Vlasovites with the word porazhentsy, "defeatists", the word used by the Bolsheviks during World War I towards themselves, as they campaigned against the war efforts of the Russian Empire and for overthrow of the reactionary Tsarist and later imperialist bourgeois government with a revolutionary civil war; Nikolaevsky drew a parallel between Vlasov and Leninists and thought the first to be influenced by the latter, believing that Vlasov's motivation was to begin a similar civil war. The Vlasovites embraced Nicolaevsky's narrative, and he would help them to operate through the CIA-supported AMCOMLIB, however, Roman Gul believed that they were insincere and saw Nicolaevsky only as "a direct and CLEAN entry to Washington" and were interested in the Socialist émigrés, including Nicolaevsky, only as powerful representatives of American power. However, the Vlasovites did not have a necessity to present themselves as left-wing democrats, since the CIA did not scruple to fund the openly far-right collaborators from the Anti-Bolshevik Bloc of Nations, like the Belarusian Central Council.

Nicolaevsky's narrative resulted in a polemics among the émigrés, and opponents of Nicolaevsky among oborontsy, the word from the vocabulary of World War I to indicate the patriotic opposition to the Bolsheviks' defeatism, the supporters of the war effort of the USSR in World War II, attacked the Vlasovites and Nicolaevsky: according to them, the democratic program was just a way to court the West in the face of Nazi defeat, that they were national traitors and mere "powerless pawns" in "organized and merciless destruction" of their own people, a "propaganda trick", and that they were unscrupulous people motivated only by lust for power or physical survival whose movement could not be democratic in any way. B. Dvinov, one of the most harsh Nicolaevsky's opponents, supported his publications with documents. Alexander Dallin called his publications "a documented but one-sided attempt in Russian émigré politics to reduce the Vlasov movement to a German propaganda trick."

Among the positions of the émigrés was a compromise one that 'Vlasovism' may be a democratic movement, but Vlasov and the other leaders should be condemned, and that the Vlasovites should admit that collaboration with the Nazis was a mistake, but the Vlasovites from the SBONR, which joined the AMCOMLIB, refused to admit the latter and continued to idolize their executed leader; they accused their opponents of Communism, while the Socialist émigrés accused Vlasovites of Nazism, and both claims were dangerous since the FBI had been closely monitoring both of the factions. More to it, the SBONR in their responses made nationalist and allegedly antisemitic dog whistles, since they never mentioned the Jewish origins of their opponents, but contrasted the "Russian people" with the American exiles who "long ago forgotten how to understand" the first; later they compromised themselves more with "historical apologies for restoration and reaction", therefore making Nicolaevsky's narrative unable to be adopted as universal, since one of their publications called Kerensky a traitor for preventing the Kornilov coup in 1917. However, after the polemic Nicolaevsky continued his publications about the biographies of the Vlasovite leaders and did not change his opinion, and not all the Socialist émigrés dismissed Nicolaevsky and his narrative.

Benjamin Tromly and other authors believe the description of the ROA as a somewhat revolutionary movement of ideological protest against Stalinism which conflicted with the Nazis to be largely constructed by the Vlasovites themselves, this claim is rather inaccurate, which questions the work of several Western historians: along with the sovietologist Eugene Lyons, the chairman of the AMCOMLIB whose attitude towards the Vlasovites was ambivalent, who also believed the ROA to be influenced with Lenin's revolutionary defeatism, the historians Jurgen Thorwald and Joachim Hoffmann also contributed to the theme; the historian George Fischer, on the contrary, believed the "inertness" and opportunism caused by Stalinist totalitarianism to be the grounds of the ROA, but he saw Vlasov's political career as an overcoming of opportunism and "inertness", although he failed to "overcome" "Bolshevism"; Catherine Andreev agreed with Fischer's last point, but criticized the other two. More to it, Tromly believes that the works of Catherine Andreev and Kirill Aleksandrov keep the "essential contours" of Nicolaevsky's narrative, and that Andreev "bypasses controversial questions about the context in which Vlasov troops were recruited, the émigrés employed in Nazi security agencies, and the deep internal hostilities within the KONR's ranks", as well as the war crimes committed by the soldiers of the ROA. This theme was also explored by Dallin who wrote that "Vlasov was no puppet: therein lay, from the German point of view, both his potential value and his challenge. A relatively 'autonomous' figure, as yet untarnished by association with German abuses and atrocities, he could appeal to the Soviet population more successfully than could the Germans. But as a leader with a will and a following, he and his movement could also develop a dynamic of their own and — precisely because they might be successful — could become potentially distinct from or even hostile to the interests of the German leadership." Dallin also wrote that the idea of the "third force" promoted by the Vlasovites and the NTS was doomed: "no 'third force' could succeed because there was no viable third choice; neither of the titans would tolerate a power vacuum — nor the arrogation of power by a new, autonomous competitor." Most of these historians relied mostly on the Nazi documents and not the Soviet archives, partly because the latter were unaccessible.

A new narrative was constructed in the 1970s and emerged in Aleksandr Solzhenitsyn's book The GULAG Archipelago: while not directly advocating collaboration, he and the later authors labelled Vlasov as "the symbol of the suffering Russian people" and its "victimhood" throughout the 20th century. Solzhenitsyn described the Vlasovite prisoners met by him in GULAG camps and wrote that "it's not the Vlasovites who betrayed Russia - it's the Soviet state which betrayed these soldiers", since "Stalin sacrificed armies meaninglessly. He had treated prisoners of war as traitors", and the World War II became "a double sacrifice. This is the idea that the Soviet people, now increasingly perceived as the Russian people, won the war against Nazism despite the brutality and incompetence of the Soviet state. In this context, Vlasov's sacrifice is entirely appropriate." With all these narratives given, Benjamin Tromly calls Vlasov an "empty signifier". Julia Shapiro writes that Vlasov during his collaboration with the Nazis managed to secure his image for the further generations, but "his intentionally murky beliefs make him a convenient straw man to suit cultural and political agendas. Based on the documents, he can be framed as an anti-Bolshevist crusader, Russian patriot, misunderstood democrat, martyred hero, and fascist puppet. Eighty years on, he still defies categorization." Shapiro believed that Vlasov's motivations were complex and laid between opportunism and ideological opposition; she believes moral relativism and "historical consciousness" to be among his most important qualities.

==== Post-Soviet Russia ====
After perestroika and the fall of the Soviet Union, narratives described above entered Russian historiography and memory politics. These narratives challenge the myth of the Soviet, increasingly perceived as Russian, Victory in the Great Patriotic War, which is significant to Russian national identity. As this myth has been increasingly used by Vladimir Putin and his Putinist regime to legitimize its state and its actions, the figure of Vlasov gains a political value in contemporary Russia. The positive attitude towards Vlasov became visible in the late 1980s, but the majority of Russian society is negative towards collaboration, although there is still no unity on this question. The fall of the Soviet Union did not lead to immediate popularisation of Vlasov among the emerging far-right nationalists, since they preferred the ideals of Pan-Slavism and an Empire to a separatist nation-state. A major liberal politician during the fall of the USSR and the mayor of Moscow Gavriil Popov wrote a complimentary book about Vlasov, but was not supported. In the 2000s various nationalist organizations which associated themselves with the White movement campaigned for rehabilitation of Vlasov; the support for the White narrative in the Church caused a scandal after the reunification of the Orthodox Church in Russia and the Russian Orthodox Church Abroad.

Solzhenitsyn's narrative became more or less convenient, since it did not deny the role of Victory and the Great Patriotic War and united it with criticism of Stalin and the understanding of Vlasov's tragedy which could be reintegrated into national history, making it more inclusive. Yet, it became debated in the 1990s and received a backlash as a "slander of the entire generation" "who had fought in the war". The opponents of such narratives, including the Communist Party of the Russian Federation created in 1993, started connecting the apology for Vlasov and the ROA with the chaos of the 1990s: economic collapse, dissolution of the Soviet Union and the First Chechen War, the rise of organized crime, making Vlasov a symbol "past and current betrayal in Russia"; in the second part of the 1990s, Boris Yeltsin turned back to commemoration of the Great Patriotic War, and after the rise of Putin, "this anti-Vlasov discourse hardens and takes on increasing domestic political uses," connecting Vlasov with the 'collapse of Empire' and influence of the West. Jade McGlynn and Tromly describe how Vlasov's figure became unsuitable for the Putin regime; however, it was not until 2022 when it received significant attention.

Throughout the 2000s, the state-sponsored narratives of World War II villainized Vlasov again whenever his figure appeared in public discourse, although the latter did not happen often. In the 2010s, the debates over Vlasov moved to historiography, and Kirill Aleksandrov was stripped of his PhD by the Ministry of Education in 2016 after writing a dissertation about the ROA; the earlier successful defense of this dissertation was followed with a scandal, as pro-Kremlin organizations, including the CPRF, forwarded the dissertation to Russian prosecutors to inspect for violation of Putin's "memory law", which criminalizes "lies about the activities of the Soviet Union in the Second World War" and held rallies with slogans such as "Bandera in Ukraine - Vlasov in Russia", and Aleksandrov's article about Bandera written back in 2014 was designated as an extremist material; the professional historians who joined the attacks compared the dissertation with "blackening of our history" by foreigners.

After the Annexation of Crimea and the beginning of the War in Donbas in 2014 Putin called the Ukrainian authorities "Banderites", and Kremlin-affiliated media and politicians alike framed the fighting as a rerun of the Second World War; the usage of the word "banderite" became popular in propaganda, and the Russian media and politicians were eager to remind of collaborators of other nationalities, Tatars and Chechens, but avoided Vlasov and the ROA: McGlynn noted that in an analysis of 3,509 comparisons between the 2014 conflict and World War II, Vlasov was mentioned just once, as a reminder of Russian collaboration could "besmirch Russia's moral authority as an heir to the Soviet Union's Great Victory of 1945 and self-appointed defender of the war's memory." According to Tromly, the Russian state avoids the mentions of ethnic Russian collaboration and views "reviving a positive memory of Vlasov" as an "instrument of information war" against itself.

The attention to Vlasov increased after the Russian invasion of Ukraine: McGlynn notes that "written references to Vlasovites have increased to levels that usually accompany the release of a popular new book on the subject." Some of them are related to the Ukrainian units of Russian citizens, like the Freedom of Russia Legion, while prominent nationalist figures have branded Russians fleeing mobilization as Vlasovite deserters, and some media reminded of the connection between Vlasovites and Banderites; after criticizing the war, the journalist Dmitry Kolezev received a flood of messages with the same text: "Only Vlasovites discredit the army." Before the invasion, Alexei Navalny was labelled a Vlasovite, as the official allegations included "memory crimes"; in 2020, the Russian Foreign Ministry officially protested against a monument to the ROA fighters who participated in the Prague Uprising. Putin personally mentioned Vlasov only in 2024, after the presidential elections, during which the Ukrainian units of Russian citizens launched an incursion into Russia; he labelled as "Vlasovites" these units, reminded how the Vlasovites were executed, and ordered the FSB to track down every Russian citizen "fighting against Russia". He said: "We will punish them without a statute of limitations, wherever they are."

=== Attempts of rehabilitation ===
In 2001, a Russian organization "For Faith and Fatherland" applied to the Russian Federation's military prosecutor for a review of Vlasov's case, saying that "Vlasov was a patriot who spent much time re-evaluating his service in the Red Army and the essence of Stalin's regime before agreeing to collaborate with the Germans". The military prosecutor concluded that the law of rehabilitation of victims of political repressions did not apply to Vlasov and refused to consider the case again. However, Vlasov's Article 58 conviction for anti-Soviet agitation and propaganda was vacated.

== Memorial ==
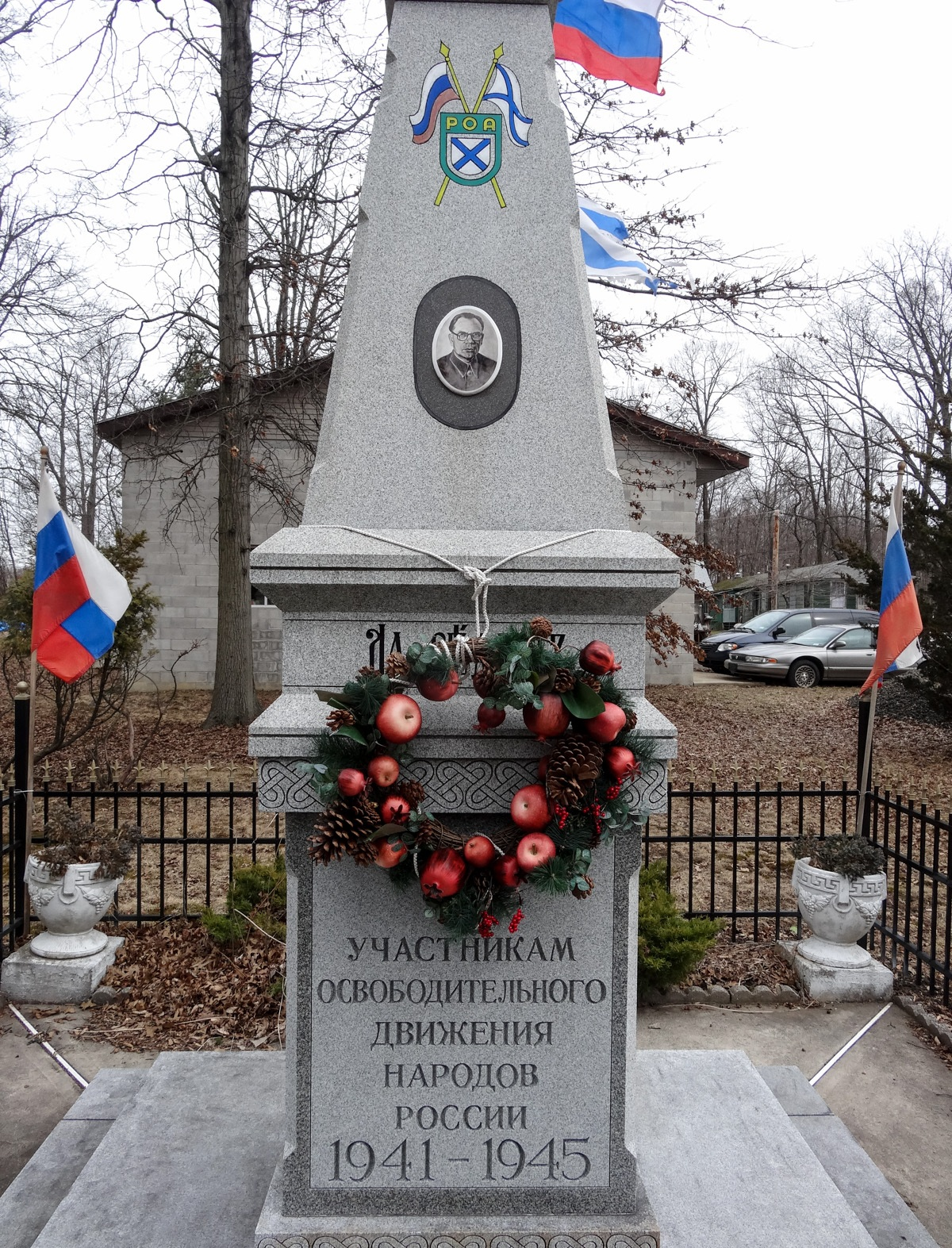
Monument dedicated to Andrey Vlasov and the combatants of the Russian Liberation Army in New York

A memorial dedicated to General Vlasov was erected at the Novo-Diveevo Russian Orthodox convent and cemetery in Nanuet, New York. Twice annually, on the anniversary of Vlasov's execution and on the Sunday following Orthodox Easter, a memorial service is held for Vlasov and the forces of the Russian Liberation Army.

== See also ==
- Engelen des doods (Angels of death)
- Cossack collaboration with Nazi Germany
- National Committee for a Free Germany
- Walther von Seydlitz-Kurzbach
- Friedrich Paulus

Military offices
Preceded by Unknown	Commander of the 99th Rifle Division; January 1940 – 17 January 1941	Succeeded by Eventually Colonel Dionisy Lisetsky (unit reformed in 1943)
Preceded by Major General Mikhail Potapov	Commander of the 4th Mechanized Corps; 17 January 1941 – July 1941	Succeeded by Eventually Major General Vasily Volsky (unit reformed in 1942)
Preceded by Position established	Commander of the 37th Army; July 1941 – September 1941	Succeeded by Major General Anton Lopatin
Preceded by Lieutenant General Nikolai Klykov	Commander of the 2nd Shock Army; 16 April – 1 July 1942	Succeeded by Lieutenant General Nikolai Klykov
Preceded by Position established	Commander of the Russian Liberation Army; February – 12 May 1945	Succeeded by Position abolished
Political offices
Preceded by Position established	Chairman of the Committee for the Liberation of the Peoples of Russia; 14 November 1944 – 12 May 1945	Succeeded by Mikhail Meandrov
