= Jade McGlynn =

British historian and author

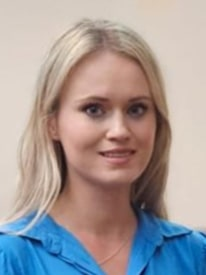
- McGlynn in 2023
- Born: Jade Selena McGlynn
- Education: University of Oxford; University of Birmingham

Jade Selena McGlynn is a British researcher, lecturer, linguist, historian, and author specialising in modern Eastern Europe, particularly Russia under Vladimir Putin. As research fellow at the Department of War Studies, King's College London, her work has focussed on the Russo-Ukrainian War since 2014, as well as identity construction, memory politics, propaganda, and state-society relations in the Russian Federation. McGlynn is also affiliated with the Faculty of Medieval and Modern Languages at the University of Oxford.

== Early life and education ==
McGlynn studied Russian and Spanish at the University of Oxford, obtaining her Bachelor of Arts there, before completing her Russian Studies research Master of Arts at the University of Birmingham in 2017. In the 2010s, McGlynn lived and worked in the Russian cities of Moscow, Saint Petersburg, Voronezh, Pskov, and Sochi for four years, as well as travelling extensively throughout Russia and other post-Soviet states. From 2018 to 2020, McGlynn conducted her PhD studies in Russian at the University of Oxford on the Russian government and media's politicisation and securitisation of history during Vladimir Putin's third presidential term (2012–2018).

== Career ==
McGlynn obtained her DPhil from Oxford for her dissertation Reliving the Past. How the Russian Government and Media Use History to Frame the Present (2020). She analysed that since Putin's return to the presidency in 2012, the Kremlin has put the "Great Patriotic War", a term used in reference to the 1941–1945 fight of the Soviet Union (reduced to Russia in this narrative) against Nazism (conveniently leaving out the 1939 Molotov–Ribbentrop Pact with Nazi Germany), at the centre of Russian identity and politics, thereby arguing that the Russian Federation was entitled to dominate all the lands occupied or essentially controlled by the Red Army at the end of World War II. Whereas Putin in January 2018 compared Russophobia to antisemitism, McGlynn considered conflation of modern Russophobia and Nazi antisemitism to be a part of propaganda strategy that uses historical framing to create a flattering narrative that the Russo-Ukrainian War is a restaging of the Great Patriotic War.

Since the full-scale Russian invasion of Ukraine began in February 2022, McGlynn has made frequent contributions in English-language international media, including the BBC, CNN, Deutsche Welle, Foreign Policy, The Times, The Telegraph, and The Spectator. Writing for The Washington Post, Michael S. Neiberg praised McGlynn's monographs Russia's War (2023) and Memory Makers: The Politics of the Past in Putin's Russia (2023) as being able to explain the reasons why the 2022 Russian invasion of Ukraine happened, which to many "Western eyes ... appeared to make no sense." Instead, she made the case that the war turning into such a catastrophe for Russian society in the present could only be understood from how the Russian government and state-controlled media had been distorting views of the past; these included erroneous notions such as that Ukraine had always been a natural part of Russia, which was destined to be restored as a great power that it once was, and that Russian soldiers were engaged in a heroic struggle against a decadent West rather than in war crimes against those very Ukrainians they considered to be their "Russian brothers".

In The Times, Marc Bennetts wrote that Russia's War demonstrated that most ordinary Russians were not enthusiastic about the war but felt there was nothing they could do about it, and therefore tended to go along with the Kremlin's propaganda, as it provided the common people with comfortable lies in challenging circumstances. Political scientist Leo Goretti added that Memory Makers made the case that the Russian leadership itself had fallen victim. Over time, the historical truth of the Kremlin has acquired such emotional and framing power that in the end, in the author's words, "Putin and those around him have started to believe their own lies." According Goretti, McGlynn's book Memory Makers was "much-needed reading for scholars who want to dig deeper into the discourse underpinning Russia's war of aggression against Ukraine and the political use of history in today's world more generally." Although it was somewhat lacking in cross-examining "how professional and academic historians have reacted to the Kremlin's weaponisation of history", Goretti called her work a "thorough and painstaking analysis", including of "thousands of newspaper articles on the Russia-Ukraine conflict in spring 2014" alone.

== Selected works ==
=== Monographs ===
- McGlynn, Jade Selena (2017). Rewriting the past: how the Russian government and media framed the Ukraine crisis through the great patriotic war (Research Master of Arts thesis). University of Birmingham.
- McGlynn, Jade (2020). Reliving the Past. How the Russian Government and Media Use History to Frame the Present (PhD thesis). University of Oxford. pp. 360. (dissertation).
- Jade McGlynn, Memory Makers: The Politics of the Past in Putin's Russia (2023). xii, 234 p. London, New York, Oxford: Bloomsbury Academic. ISBN 978-1-350-28076-2.
- Jade McGlynn, Russia's War (2023). 264 p. Cambridge, Hoboken: Polity Press. ISBN 9781509556779.

=== Journal articles ===
- McGlynn, Jade (27 September 2018). "Historical framing of the Ukraine Crisis through the Great Patriotic War: Performativity, cultural consciousness and shared remembering". Memory Studies. 13 (6). Sage Publishing: 1058–1080. doi:10.1177/1750698018800740. S2CID 149964916.
- McGlynn, Jade (29 October 2020). "United by History: Government Appropriation of Everyday Nationalism During Vladimir Putin's Third Term". Nationalities Papers. 48 (6). Cambridge University Press: 1069–1085. doi:10.1017/nps.2020.20. S2CID 228974820.
- McGlynn, Jade; Đureinović, Jelena (5 March 2022). "The alliance of victory: Russo-Serbian memory diplomacy". Memory Studies. 16 (2). Sage Publishing: 227–242. doi:10.1177/17506980211073108. S2CID 247248278.

=== Co-authored or co-edited works ===
- (co-edited) Conley, Heather A. (1 September 2020). The Diversity of Russia's Military Power: Five Perspectives. Washington, D.C.: Center for Strategic and International Studies. p. 43.
- (co-edited by Jade McGlynn and Lucian George), Rethinking Period Boundaries: New Approaches to Continuity and Discontinuity in Modern European History and Culture (2022), pp. 267. De Gruyter Oldenbourg. ISBN 9783110632064.
- Co-author of the chapters "Promoting Patriotism" and "Living Forms of Patriotism" in: Félix Krawatzek, Nina Friess, Youth and Memory in Europe: Defining the Past, Shaping the Future (2022), p. 221–246. Walter de Gruyter. ISBN 9783110733501.
- (co-authored by Jade McGlynn and Oliver T. Jones), Researching Memory and Identity in Russia and Eastern Europe: Interdisciplinary Methodologies (2023), pp. 218. London: Palgrave Macmillan. ISBN 9783030999148.
- Maria Snegovaya, Michael Kimmage, and Jade McGlynn, (September 2023). "The Ideology of Putinism: Is It Sustainable?" CSIS website Access 4 October 2026.
