= Mikhail Feofanovich Potapov =

Soviet soldier (1921–1943)

- Born: 23 January 1921; Baklanovskaya, Rostov Oblast, Russian SFSR (now Russian Federation)
- Died: 8 July 1943 (aged 22) near Ponyri Railway Station, Kursk Oblast, Russian SFSR, Soviet Union (now Russian Federation)
- Burial place: Berezovets, Kursk Oblast, Russian Federation
- Military career
- Allegiance: Soviet Union
- Branch: Red Army
- Service years: 1938–1943
- Rank: Captain
- Units: 1188th Anti-Tank Artillery Regiment, 13th Anti-Tank Artillery Brigade, 2nd Tank Army, Central Front
- Conflicts: World War II; Battle of Kursk
- Awards: Hero of the Soviet Union; Order of Lenin; Order of the Red Banner

Mikhail Feofanovich Potapov (Russian: Михаи́л Феофа́нович Пота́пов, 23 January 1921 - 8 July 1943) was a Soviet Red Army artillery captain and commander of an anti-tank artillery battery from the 1188th Anti-Tank Artillery Regiment of the 13th Anti-Tank Artillery Brigade, 2nd Tank Army. Potapov's battery destroyed ten German tanks near the Ponyri railway station at the Battle of Kursk.

Captain Potapov was killed during the battle on 8 July 1943. He was twenty-two years old and had been in the Red Army since 1938.

He had served in the artillery as an officer since graduating from the Moscow Artillery School in 1940 and had received the Order of the Red Banner and other decorations during his war service.

He was posthumously named a Hero of the Soviet Union and awarded the Gold Star and Order of Lenin on 7 August 1943.
