= Gagino, Nizhny Novgorod Oblast =

Rural locality in Nizhny Novgorod Oblast, Russia

Coordinates: 55°13′50″N 45°01′34″E

Gagino (Russian: Га́гино) is a rural locality (a selo) and the administrative center of Gaginsky District, Nizhny Novgorod Oblast, Russia. Population: 3,891 (2010 census); 4,001 (2002 census); 3,865 (1989 Soviet census).
