= Wilfried Strik-Strikfeldt =

German Army officer

Wilfried Karl Strik-Strikfeldt
- Вильфрид Карлович Штрик-Штрикфельдт
- Born: July 23, 1896; Riga, Russian Empire
- Died: September 7, 1977 (aged 81); Oberstaufen, West Germany
- Military career
- Allegiance: Russian Empire (to 1917); Latvia (to 1939); Nazi Germany (to 1945)
- Branch: Imperial Russian Army; German Army
- Rank: Hauptmann (1939-1945)
- Conflicts: World War I; Russian Civil War; World War II

Wilfried Karl Strik-Strikfeldt (Russian: Ви́льфрид Ка́рлович Штри́к-Штри́кфельдт; 23 July 1896 – 7 September 1977) was a Baltic German officer in the Wehrmacht during World War II, known for his involvement with General Andrey Vlasov and the German-sponsored Russian Liberation Army.

== Early years ==
Strik-Strikfeldt was born in Riga, Latvia (then part of the Russian Empire), and attended the Nicholas Cavalry College in St. Petersburg. He attended the centenary celebrations of the Battle of Borodino in 1912, and during World War I volunteered to fight as an officer in the Imperial Russian Army against Germany. During the Russian Civil War he fought against the Bolsheviks in Latvia and Ingria, as a supporter of the White movement.

In 1920 he met Gustav Hilger (later a counsellor to the Nazi German embassy in Moscow in 1939–41) in his capacity as an official co-ordinating efforts to repatriate Austrian and German military prisoners after the war. That same year Strik-Strikfeldt settled back in Riga, in the newly independent Latvia. In the early 1920s Strik-Strikfeldt was involved in Fridtjof Nansen's activities to alleviate the Great Famine in Russia. Between 1924 and 1939 he represented the interests of British and German heavy engineering companies in Latvia. His work was also part of the literature event in the art competition at the 1936 Summer Olympics.

== Germany ==
In late 1939 Strik-Strikfeldt, along with the majority of Latvia's ethnic Germans (Volksdeutsche), was "repatriated" to Nazi Germany following the Molotov–Ribbentrop Pact. His family was settled in Posen (now Poznań), the administrative capital of the Warthegau (today, the Kraj Warty, Poland).

In early 1941 Strik-Strikfeldt was interviewed by a German army staff officer in Posen and asked to undertake an interpreter's examination in Berlin, where he was awarded a certificate as "Interpreter Class A". Due to his service in the former Russian Imperial Army he was only inducted into the Army as a captain. He was initially attached to Field-Marshal Fedor von Bock's HQ in the Warthegau, where he met and worked with Generalmajor (Major-General) Reinhard Gehlen and Generalmajor Henning von Tresckow. Gehlen encouraged him to lecture to other officers during the war on Der Russische Mensch ("The Russian Man") and even helped distribute Strik-Strikfeldt's lecture as an official OKW Propaganda Department paper to intelligence officers along the front line.

Early in 1942 Strik-Strikfeldt was transferred to the Oberkommando des Heeres (OKH) "War Booty Collection Centre" office in Angerburg, East Prussia, to sort through captured Russian military papers and documents for the Fremde Heere Ost ("Foreign Armies East") of the Army General Staff. In the spring and summer he worked briefly with Gehlen and Claus von Stauffenberg.

Over July and August 1942 Strik-Strikfeldt met and interviewed ex-Communist and former Soviet Army General Andrey Vlasov in a German PoW camp in Vinnitsa. The two developed a close rapport, with Vlasov addressing Strik-Strikfeldt privately by the Russian-style patronymic "Wilfried Karlovich". In September 1942 Strik-Strikfeldt was formally seconded to the OKW Propaganda Department office in Berlin as a Betreuer ("Confidante") responsible for Vlasov.

"In August 1942 I arrived in Berlin. The so-called Russian Collaboration Staff of the OKW/Pr was located in the Viktoriastrasse under lock and key. Barred windows, wooden bunks. Straw mattresses. No permission to leave the building. All doors were locked at night. I was shocked."

== Dabendorf ==
Early in November 1942 Gehlen and von Stauffenberg were able to authorize the establishment of a "training camp for Russian volunteers, to be known as Ost-propagandaabteilung ZbV (Eastern Propaganda Department ZbV)…. The proposed camp, with huts, at Dabendorf, was not far from Berlin. In due course the Ostpropagandaabteilung was known simply as Dabendorf."

Propagandaabteilung Dabendorf was granted the status of an independent battalion commanded by Captain Strik-Strikfeldt and although initially conceived as a 50-strong unit, was immediately increased in size to 1,200 on the urging of Strik-Strikfeldt.

"My official task, with that of my German and Russian staff, was to recruit and train 'propagandists', i.e. Betreuer, for the Russian Volunteers and Auxiliaries and the same for all permanent and transit prison camps throughout the whole of German-dominated Europe."

At Dabendorf Strik-Strikfeldt and his staff initiated two Russian language newspapers : Dobrovolets ("Volunteers") for ordinary Russian volunteers and auxiliaries serving in the Army and Zarya ("Dawn") for PoWs. Strik-Strikfeldt also persuaded Vlasov to publish, in March 1943, his article "Why I took up the struggle against Bolshevism" (a bitter attack on the Soviet system) and in April 1943, his pamphlet on the nationalities/minorities issue within Russia and Europe.

In February 1943 Sergei Frohlich, a "resettled" Baltic German Volksdeutsche from Riga working in the HQ staff of the SA, was appointed liaison officer with Vlasov's staff. Strik-Strikfeldt knew Frohlich well as they had played ice hockey in rival teams as youths. Frohlich was able to help provide Strik-Strikfeldt, Vlasov and Dabendorf with small arms, extra food rations and quarters.

In 1943 Strik-Strikfeldt escorted Vlasov to Vienna where he served as an interpreter at an official meeting with Baldur von Schirach. Then he took Vlasov to Munich and the Allgäu in Bavaria. Afterwards they travelled together to Frankfurt and Mainz, and took a steamer down the Rhine to Cologne. Later they met with Dr. Julius Lippert (the Stadtpräsident of Berlin), and also the Minister of Finance, Lutz Graf Schwerin von Krosigk, to discuss the Russian liberation movement and the urgent need to reform the treatment of Russian labourers inside Germany.

"I regarded Dabendorf as the heart of the Russian Liberation Movement and as a purely Russian centre. So that from the beginning I had refrained from any sort of interference in Russian affairs."

By late Autumn 1943 Dabendorf was under constant criticism from the Reich Ministry for the Occupied Eastern Territories (the Ostministerium), the Sicherheitsdienst ("Security Service") of the SS, and even rival elements within the Army who wanted to absorb and "assimilate" Dabendorf. When many Russian Hiwi's were withdrawn from the Eastern Front and sent to work on fortifications in the West, Dabendorf sent propagandists to raise morale and soothe troubled spirits. However several were arrested in France and others sent directly back to Dabendorf. Strik-Strikfeldt was obliged to travel to Paris and liaise with the German military authorities there.

In January 1944 Strik-Strikfeldt was interviewed by General Köstring when the latter was appointed head of the Osttruppen formations. Köstring confirmed that the Führer would never deviate from his Russian policy and told Strik-Strikfeldt : "The fact is that Hitler will have nothing to do with Vlasov."

== The SS ==
In the spring of 1944 Strik-Strikfeldt was introduced to SS-Standartenführer Gunter d'Alquen, the Chief Editor of the SS weekly newspaper, Das Schwarze Korps ("The Black Corps"), and commander of the SS-Standarte Kurt Eggers. Henceforth some senior SS officers began to take a positive interest in Vlasov and his movement. The most interested was Dr. Fritz Arlt, head of the Freiwilligen-Leitstelle-Ost ("Volunteer Central Office - East"). Arlt informed Strik-Strikfeldt that the Waffen-SS intended to make greater use of Soviet and Eastern European minorities under SS auspices. Strik-Strikfeldt also held meetings at this time with SS-Gruppenführer Otto Ohlendorf (the deputy secretary of state in the Ministry for Economics and former commander of Einsatzgruppe D), SS-Brigadeführer Walter Schellenberg (head of Ausland-SD) and Dr. Otto Wächter (creator of the Ukrainian 14th Waffen-SS Division).

Strik-Strikfeldt was even initially interviewed by the head of the SS recruitment office, SS-General Gottlob Berger. Strik-Strikfeldt was then obliged to arrange a personal meeting between Vlasov and Berger where the latter appointed SS-Oberführer Erhard Kroeger as a formal liaison officer between Vlasov and the SS. Strik-Strikfeldt agreed since Kroeger had been involved in the resettlement of Baltic German Volksdeutsche over 1939-1940. At this meeting Berger also proposed a formal meeting between Vlasov and Heinrich Himmler.

"It seemed that the SS now, in the early summer of 1944, were to take the opportunity that the Army had missed back in 1941."

On 16 September 1944 Strik-Strikfeldt and Vlasov met the Reichsführer-SS at the latter's field HQ in Rastenburg, East Prussia. Himmler had been placed in command of the Ersatzheer ("Replacement Army") following the 20 July plot, and was therefore in a position to supply Dabendorf with military equipment and training, and even offered vague political concessions. An official communiqué was issued to mark the occasion. Returning to Berlin in a train, Strik-Strikfeldt shared a sleeper with Dr. Felix Kersten (Himmler's personal masseur and also a Baltic German) who claimed to have been supporting their "good cause". There was an enthusiastic reception for Strik-Strikfeldt and Vlasov at Dabendorf and work began immediately to prepare the ill-fated Manifesto of the Committee for the Liberation of the Peoples of Russia.

"When General Gehlen came back to duty I gave him an unvarnished report. Himmler had appointed the SS General Berger as his plenipotentiary in all Russian affairs. Kroeger was liaison officer. SS Colonel Burg had the task of setting up the Russian divisions. Gehlen asked me to stay with Vlasov for as long as I could."

Late in 1944 Strik-Strikfeldt met the Cossack White Army-era General Pyotr Krasnov and tried to convince him to join Vlasov but to no avail.

Strik-Strikfeldt was not invited to Prague for the formal ceremony declaring the Manifesto of the Committee for the Liberation of the Peoples of Russia. However General Gehlen ordered him to arrange a meeting and translate between Vlasov and General Ernst Köstring, so he was present at the official programme. At the evening banquet Vlasov made a speech and publicly acknowledged an "unnamed German officer of the rank of Captain".

"Later, I was invited to join Vlasov and [Georgii] Zhilenkov at a table where they were sitting with a senior SS officer. He turned out to be deputy head of Personnel Department of the Waffen-SS. They quickly came to the point : I should transfer to the SS and remain with Vlasov. Vlasov emphasized that this was not his proposal, though he would be glad if I were to come back to him."

Strik-Strikfeldt tried to squirm out of the offer and Gehlen arranged for him to take sick leave in Pomerania where he wrote up a rough draft history of the Vlasov movement that would later serve as the basis for his 1970 book "Gegen Stalin und Hitler. General Wlassow und die russische Freiheitsbewegung" ("Against Stalin and Hitler: Memoir of the Russian Liberation Movement"). In December 1944 one of Gehlen's officers visited Strik-Strikfeldt and asked him to help accommodate units of the Russian Liberation Army in the Posen area.

"A fellow-Balt provided an introduction to Greiser, who quickly grasped the position and promised help."

On 20 January 1945 Strik-Strikfeldt's wife, and daughter Dela, were evacuated from Posen. Three days later Sergei Frohlich ordered him to travel to Frankfurt an der Oder immediately, whence he was collected and taken to Dabendorf.

"I went to Zossen to see General Gehlen, who told me to go and find my family. After many adventures I found them in the little village of Sallgast between Finsterwalde and Senftenberg. My mother wanted to stay there, she was tired of being on the move. All her life she had been a refugee."

In early April 1945 Gehlen had Strik-Strikfeldt posted as sick and after some confusion at the OKH, he left and took his family to the Allgäu. On 14 April Vlasov, Kroeger, and a few senior officers of the Russian Liberation Army tracked him down and they had their last meeting. Strik-Strikfeldt agreed to negotiate their surrender with the Western powers. Interrogated by the US Colonel Snyder and later General Patch, Strik-Strikfeldt became a PoW and was moved to Augsburg where he was interned with Göring and Gehlen amongst others. Later he was transferred to Mannheim and interned with Field-Marshals von Blomberg, List, von Weichs and von Leeb; and Generals Guderian and Köstring. Here he also met up with Gustav Hilger again and Hitler's personal photographer Heinrich Hoffmann.

== Death ==
Strik-Strikfeldt died in Oberstaufen in September 1977. His 1970 memoirs, Gegen Stalin und Hitler. General Wlassow und die russische Freiheitsbewegung (Against Stalin and Hitler: Memoir of the Russian Liberation Movement), are an important source regarding the Russian Nazi collaborators and General Vlasov, and also the role played by Baltic Germans.
