= Dietrich A. Loeber =

Dietrich André Loeber (January 4, 1923 in Riga – June 24, 2004 in Hamburg) was a legal scholar and professor of law and legal history.

== Life ==
Loeber was born into a Baltic German family to J. August Loeber, a law professor, senator and member of the Latvian Supreme Court, and Emilie Mentzendorff. After graduating from the Friedrich Wilhelms Gymnasium, Dietrich Loeber served from 1941 to 1945 under Admiral Wilhelm Canaris. After studying law from 1946 to 1953 at the Hague Academy of International Law and Columbia University, he worked as a lawyer in Munich and Hamburg. Loeber was an editor of the journal East European Law from 1955 to 1960, and at the Max Planck Institute for Comparative and International Law from 1958 to 1970. Habilitation at the University of Hamburg was achieved in 1966. From 1966 to 1989, he was a Professor of Law at the Christian Albrechts University in Kiel. Loeber worked as a visiting professor and researcher at the Moscow State University in 1961, the Harvard Law School from 1963 to 1964, the University of California, Los Angeles in 1970 and 1974, at Stanford University in 1971 and 1973, and at Columbia University from 1980 to 1981 and 1983.

== Recognition ==
In 2003, the President of Estonia awarded Loeber the Order of the Cross of Terra Mariana IV Class for his contribution to the development of the law of the state. A memorial plaque was inaugurated in 2010 in Riga.
