= Persecuted kobzars and bandurists =

List of musicians persecuted in USSR

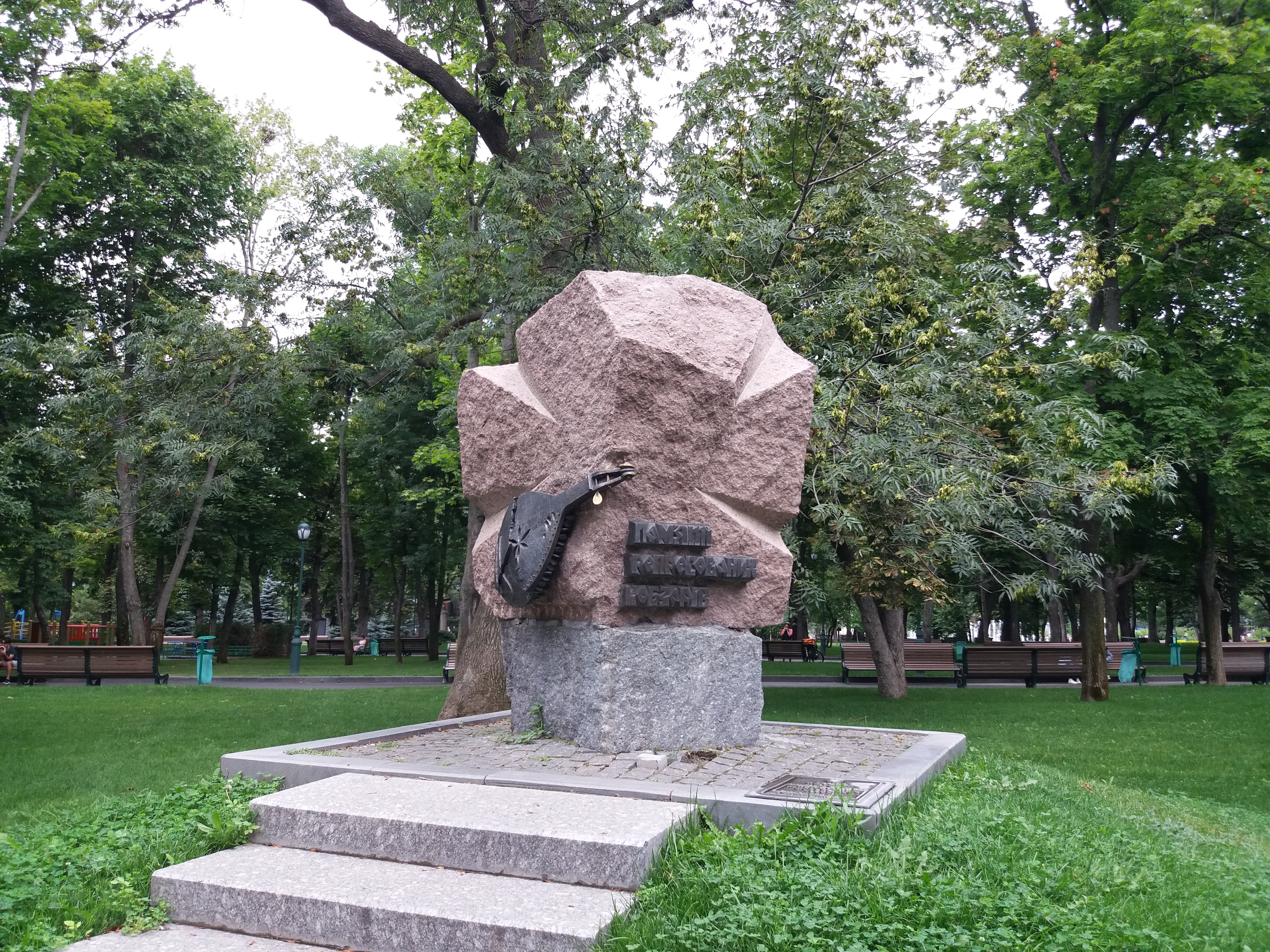
Monument to Repressed Kobzars in Kharkiv, Ukraine.

Kobzars and bandurists were a unique class of musicians in Ukraine, who travelled between towns and sang dumas, a meditative poem-song. Kobzars were usually blind, and required the completion of a three-year apprenticeship in specialized Kobzar guilds, in order to be officially recognized as such.

In 1932, on the order of Stalin, the Soviet authorities called on all Ukrainian Kobzars to attend a congress in Kharkiv. Those that arrived were taken outside the city and were all executed.

Persecution of bandurists and kobzars by the Soviet authorities can be divided up into various periods. These periods differed in the type and length of persecution and punishments were dealt out and also the reason for the punishment. Following is a list of persecuted bandurists sourced from Music from the Shadows by Roman Malko and The Voices of the Dead by Kuromiya Hiroaki.

== A ==
- Andriychyk, Hryhoriy – member of the Kiev Bandurist Capella, arrested in 1937, shot in 1938.
- Andrusenko, Mykhailo – director of the Kryvorih Bandurist Capella – arrested in 1937.

== B ==
- Babych, Andriyan – sentenced to be shot in 1937.
- Balatsky, Dmytro – director of the Kiev Bandurist Capella – arrested in October 1938. Five years' exile to Kazakhstan – rehabilitated on July 13, 1956.
- Bartashevsky, Yuri – director of the Kiev Children's Bandurist Capella.
- Bashtovyj, Davyd – sentenced to be shot in 1938.
- Bayda-Sukhovyj Danylo – arrested in 1937.
- Hryhoriy Bazhul – student of Hnat Khotkevych; spent 2 years in a forced labor camp and 2 years in exile.
- Betz-Kharchenko, S.
- Bezchasnyj, Konon – (1884–1967) – Kuban bandurist; repressed and arrested in 1937.
- Bezpalyj, Ihnat – sentenced to be shot in 1937.
- Mykola Bohuslavsky – funded Bandurist groups in the Kuban. Arrested, believed to have been shot.
- Ivan Boretz – member of the Kiev, Char'kov and later Poltava Bandurist Capellas. Director of the Horiv Bandura Ensemble – arrested on September 21, 1937, and shot on November 11, 1937. Rehabilitated on December 9, 1957.
- Oleksandr Borodai – an American citizen who returned to Ukraine. Arrested in 1919 and shot.
- But, Ivan

== C ==
- Chernihivetz, Tymofiy – arrested October 30, 1937 and sentenced to 10 years' hard labour. Rehabilitated November 27, 1956.
- Chumak, Nykyfor – arrested in 1931 – 3 years' exile. Arrested again on March 30, 1937, and sentenced to death. Shot on March 23, 1938, at 23:00.
- Chumak, I – director of the Myrhorod Bandura Ensemble.

== D ==
- Danylevsky, Borys Ivanovych – arrested on April 22, 1938, shot on July 29, 1938.
- Deineka, Karpo – (b. 1897) from Konotop.
- Derhiy, O.
- Diadurenko, Trohkym – sentenced to be shot in 1938.
- Dibrova, Fedir – member of Kuban Bandura Group – shot in 1919.
- Demchenko, Mykola – (b. 1873) originally from Kharkiv Oblast.
- Domontovych, Mykhailo – shot ca. 1928.
- Doroshko, Fedir Vasylievych – arrested in 1918 for counter-revolutionary agitation, arrested in 1937, shot in 1938.
- Drevchenko, Petro – (b. 1871) kobzar, died in 1934.
- Dumenko, Luka – kobzar.
- Oleksiy Dziubenko – arrested on October 19, 1937.

== F ==
- Fed'ko, A.
- Fedorenko, Vasyl – kobzar.

== H ==
- Halynsky-Lopata, Ivan – arrested in 1938, sentenced to be shot and commuted to 12 years in labour camps in Karelia.
- Oleksander Hamaliya – shot in Kyiv in 1920.
- Pavlo Hashchenko – kobzar.
- Hasiuk, Oleh – given 25 years of incarceration in the city of Inti Komi ARSR from 1949. Rehabilitated in 1956. Originally from the city of Lviv.
- Herashchenko, Oles' – student of Hnat Khotkevych. Arrested 1932.
- Vasyl' Herasymenko – 2 years' incarceration.
- Hlushak, Nykyfor Ivanovych – (b. 1890) arrested in 1931. Arrested again in 1937 and sentenced to 10 years of hard labour.
- Fedir Hlushko – director of the Kharkiv Bandurist Capella – arrested 1937.
- Hlushko, Konstiantyn – sentenced to be shot in 1938.
- Hnylokvas, Semen – arrested in 1938. Arrested again during the German occupation. Arrested again by the Soviets in 1948 and spent time in the very same cell as before. Spent 10 years in camps in Mordovia, later released. Performed in Kiev in 1981.
- Honcharenko, V.
- Hubenko, Mykhailo – (b. 1891) from Myrhorod.
- Hura, (Hurin) Petro Ivanovych – originally from Poltava lived in Yuzivka. Disappeared.
- Huzij, Petro Ivanovych – (1903–37) Kuban bandurist and a bandura maker. Arrested on December 1, 1937. Sentenced to death and shot on December 23, 1937.

== K ==
- Kabachok, Volodymyr – arrested 1934 – 3 months' incarceration, arrested August 1937. Sentenced to 10 years of hard labor.
- Kashuba, Josyp – member of the Kiev Bandurist Capella and later the Char'kov Bandurist Capella.
- Khotkevych, Hnat – tortured, then executed on 8 October 1938. Posthumously rehabilitated in 1956.
- Khrystenko, Makar – (b 1870) from Dnipropetrovsk.
- Khudoriavyj, P.
- Knysh, H.
- Kolesnyk, Panteleimon – sentenced to be shot.
- Kolodub.
- Kononenko, Andriy – arrested in 1938. Member of Poltava Bandurist Capella.
- Kononenko, Pylyp Petrovych – member of Poltava Kapela, Kharkiv Capella, and Konotop Capella. (Possibly mixed up with Andriy?)
- Konoplich, Kindrat – (b. 1900) member of Kyiv Bandurist Capella.
- Kopan, Heorhiy – arrested in 1930. Protested the censorship of Ukrainian songs. Arrested in 1936. Arrested again on March 19, 1938, and shot on March 28, 1938.
- Koretskiy, A.
- Kornievsky, Oleksander – 10 years' incarceration, 15 years' exile.
- Korobka, P.
- Kotelevetz, Josyp
- Krasniak, Marko – sentenced to be shot in 1938.
- Kravchenko, Danylo S. – arrested 1938, sent to Kolyma, later released. Member of the Veresai Bandura Quintet.
- Krutko, Mykola – arrested on February 1, 1938, and sentenced to be shot in the same year. Rehabilitated on March 12, 1959.
- Kryuzhkovenko – sent to Siberia in 1917.
- Kucherenko, Ivan – blind kobzar; people's artist; arrested on November 8, 1937, and shot on November 24, 1937.
- Kuzhkovenko
- Kuzmenko, I.

== L ==
- Lavryk, Teresa – from Lviv. Student of Singalevych. Sent to Siberia 1944.
- Lavrysh, Petro – (b. 1873) Poltava region.
- Liashenko, Ivan
- Lysyj, Stepan – 10 years.
- Lysyj, Vasyl' – 10 years.
- Lystopad, Volodymyr
- Lytvynenko – Odesa.

== M ==
- Matiukha, Maksym – Konotop.
- Mohyl'nyk, Vasyl' – sentenced to be shot in 1938.
- Mota – shot in Lviv by the Soviets in 1939.
- Mykhailov, Mykola – 1936. Died unexpectedly in Tashkent from angina.
- Mykolenko, Z.
- Mynzarenko, Demian – was arrested in 1936.
- Myronenko, Mykyta – was sentenced to be shot in 1938.
- Antin Mytiay (Petukh) – shot by the Bolsheviks near Kiev in 1921.

== N ==
- Nimchenko, Kuzma – bandura maker from the Kuban.

== O ==
- Oleksienko, Petro – participant of the Winter campaign in 1918. Killed in 1919.
- Oleshko, V. – student of Hnat Khotkevych.
- Opryshko, Mykola – arrested in 1931, and in 1937 after directing the Kyiv Capella for 2 weeks.
- Osad'ko, Vasyl' – director of the Reshetylivsky Bandurist Ensemble.
- Ovchinnikov, Vasyl' – arrested in 1916 and exiled to Siberia. Arrested again in 1934. Never heard of again.

== P ==
- Parasochka, Vasyl'
- Panasenko, Josyp – member of the Poltava Bandurist Capella and Ukrainian Bandurist Chorus.
- Panchenko, Fedir
- Paplynsky, Antin – bandura maker.
- Pasiuha, Stepan – kobzar.
- Petukh – see Mytiay – shot in Kiev in 1920.
- Pika, Danylo – arrested numerous times.
- Pobihailo, Oleksij
- Popov, Mykola – was sentenced to be shot in 1938.
- Potapenko, Vasyl' – was arrested on October 15, 1930 – other arrests.
- Povar, Panas.l
- Protopopov, Yakiv – member of the Poltava Bandurist Capella.
- Prudkyj, Nykin – 5/6 years.
- Prystupa, Mykhailo – was sentenced to be shot in 1938.

== R ==
- Rastorhuyev, Serhiy – was sentenced to be shot in 1938.
- Rozhchenko (Rozhko) Pylyp – from Konotop.
- Rudenko, Danylo – kobzar from Chernigov.

== S ==
- Sadovy, Serhiy – sentenced to be shot in 1938.
- Sadovskyj, Hennadiy – Baritone singer; served in the armies of the Ukrainian People's Republic. Arrested and sent to the Solovetsky islands; dug the Belomor canal.
- Salata, D.
- Sarma-Sokolovsky, Mykola – 17 years.
- Shcherbyna, Danylo – arrested on April 19, 1931. Further arrests.
- Shevchuk, H.
- Shuliak, Mykola – 15 years.
- Singalevych, Natalia – was arrested in 1950.
- Siroshtan, Ivan – kobzar.
- Skakun, Andriy – member of the Kiev Capella.
- Skoba, Antin – kobzar.
- Skrypal, N.
- Skyba, Ivan – arrested in 1938.
- Skydan, Petro – murdered in 1920.
- Slidiuk, Andriy – member of Kiev Kobzar Choir – shot by the Bolsheviks in 1919 in Starokonstantynivka.
- Snizhnyj, Josyp – sentenced to camps.
- Sohohub, Viktor – arrested in 1931, re-arrested on 30 July 1937, and shot on 27 November 1937, Chernigov, with his three sons who also played bandura.
- Solomakh, Nykyfor
- Sotnychenko, Svyryd – Kuban bandurist shot 1920.
- Symonenko, Vasyl' – kobzar.
- Syniavsky, Oleksa – philologist – professor at the Char'kov University.

== T ==
- Tabinsky, Mykhailo – Lviv bandurist arrested in 1949.
- Teliha, Mykhailo – shot by the Germans in 1942.
- Tertyshnyj, K.
- Teslia, Omelian – sentenced to be shot in 1938.
- Tokar, Illia
- Tokarevsky, Mykola – arrested on February 14, 1931 – arrested in 1938 and released in 1940.
- Tronevsky, O.
- Tsebrenko, Hryhoriy – member of the Kiev Bandurist Capella.
- Tsybuliv, Isak – member of the Kiev Bandurist Capella.

== U ==
- Ul'chenko, Vasyl' – sentenced to be shot in 1938.

== V ==
- Velykivskiy, A.
- Volodaretz, Petro. – sentenced to be shot in 1938.

== Y ==
- Yatsenko, S.
- Yashchenko, Ovram Semenovych – member of Kyiv Bandurist Capella 1918.
- Yermak, P.

== Z ==
- Zaporozhetz, I.
- Zayetz, Mykola Martynovych – (born 1902) arrested in 1923, re-arrested in 1937, finally arrested on January 29, 1938 and sentenced to be shot.
- Zatenko, – arrested 1938.
- Zelinsky, Ivan – arrested 1938.
- Zharko, Fedir – 6 years in labor camps.
- Zheplynsky, Bohdan – Lviv bandurist. Arrested in 1950 – Siberia.
- Zheplynsky, Roman – Lviv bandurist. Arrested in 1950 – Siberia.
- Zinchenko, A.
- Zinchenko, Illarion – was sentenced to be shot in 1938.
