= Slobozhan kobzars =

Ukrainian bards

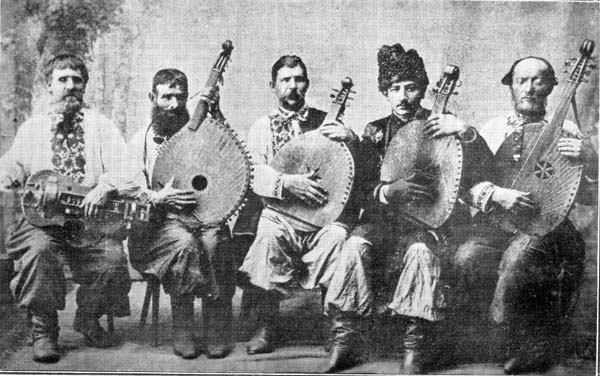
Slobozhan kobzars 1911 Okhtyrka

The kobzari of the Slobozhan bandura tradition were kobzari who lived in Sloboda Ukraine around the city of Kharkiv, Ukraine. They include Petro Drevchenko, Pavlo Hashchenko, Hnat Honcharenko, Horobetz, F. Hrytsenko-Kholodny, Hryhory Kozhushko, Ivan Kuchuhura Kucherenko, Ivan Netesa, Odnorih, Stepan Pasiuha, Mykola Ryhorenko and P. Trotchenko.

The traditions and playing technique used by the Slobozhan bandurists became the basis for the academic Kharkiv school of bandura playing developed by Hnat Khotkevych.
