= Tereshko Parkhomenko =

Ukrainian kobzar (1872–1910)

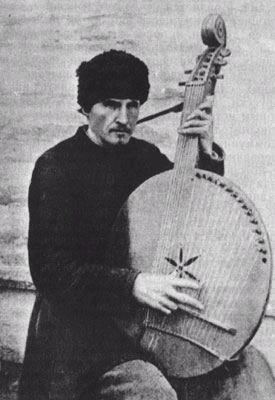
Terentiy Parkhomenko

Terentiy (Tereshko) Makarovych Parkhomenko (1872–1910) was one of the most respected Ukrainian kobzars of the late 19th and early 20th century.

== Biography ==
He was born 10 September 1872 in the village of Voloskivtsi, Sosnytsia county, in the Chernigov Governorate of the Russian Empire (modern Ukraine). He became blind at the age of 11 after a grave illness. He learned to play the bandura from the kobzar Andriy Haydenko and became a sought out performer after his performance at the XIIth Archeological Conference. He had a tenor voice and a loud bandura and played songs with a patriotic content that were rarely performed by other kobzars.

== XIIth Archeological Conference ==
This was the first stage performance of the kobzars organized by Hnat Khotkevych. The performance included the performances of six kobzars, including four from Kharkiv, one from Poltava province and one from Chernihiv province. After both the Kharkiv bandurists played and the Mykhailo Kravchenko played (and demonstrated what they knew) it was time for Tereshko to demonstrate his art.

"So that is the way you play". And for some reason he repeated the statement. And he hit the strings! His bandura was large, and loud. His manner of playing was very specific: his left hand played the basses, and the right using a specific device: the fingers hit in one direction and then the other. (Our kobzars tried it but they could not do it). His voice - a high clear tenor. A song no-one had heard before about "Morozenko". Everything added up to a victory for Tereshko. The Kharkiv kobzars sat quiet. The first place of Tereshko was a given fact, and his song about Morozenko became the most popular song.

In his essay "Some facts about the kobzars and lirnyks" Khotkevych wrote:

"About the kobzars from Chernihiv province I would like to say a bit more because this is a totally new type of bandurist which are establishing themselves and have a great future. This is Terentiy Makarovych Parkhomenko. He is 30 years old and studied under Andriy Hojdenko, however he did not learn any dumy from him nor from his friends. "No matter how much Horilka I gave them, nothing came out of it" - he said. In the meantime Terentiy wanted greatly to learn to perform dumy - something spoke to his soul. I have not seen such a bandurists who listens with such intent to the performance of dumy and historic songs like this Parkhomenko. And his energies did not fall on barren ground: after meeting some Ukrainian intellectuals, he asked that they show him some dumy, he purchased books and song books, and he has a literate guide boy specifically for the reason, that he have the potential to learn dumy and old songs. "I didn't just come to the conference to perform - he said to me - but to learn more songs". And now he has nine dumy in his repertoire, many historic songs - one of which - About Morozenko - you will hear tonight. But taking the melodies of his songs from the intelligentsia which can read and write. Terentiy does not go blindly creating arrangement which are foreign, but gives each song and individuality, returning forgotten recordings, so that the song does not have a bookish character. In such a way we can see that the intelligentsia is able to give back to the people their lost culture, and although it does not look after this culture very well, at least some aspects have been conserved. God grant Terentiy the energy to learn all that he wants. His is the future."

Terentiy knows 25 psalms, folk songs and humorous songs are so numerous in his repertoire. .... Terentiy plays on the bandura very well, and I want you to pay particular attention to the manner of playing the instrument. The matter lies in the fact that his ability to play the bandura has undergone an evolution, and in my opinion Terentiy's manner of playing is very old..."

The successful performance of the kobzars at the XIIth Archeological conference, showed a new direction in the development of kobzar art - the potential to perform this art on the stage. This new found potential was exploited initially by the kobzars that took part in the conference.

Reminiscing the performance of the kobzars after the conference Khotkevych wrote: "the most visible career was made by T. Parkhomenko. A tall with lank appearance he had a nice tenor voice as if made for the stage. He was able to use his talents: performing solo and in groups. In the periodic press there are numerous mentions about his performances in Kremenchuk, Uman', Yekaterinoslav, Vinnytsia, Elizabethgrad, Mohyla-Podilsk and other towns. The magazine "Ridniy krai" write about Parkhomenko's concert in 1908 that "it was a unique in its type: there performed blind kobzars without any intelligentsia influence. The organizer of the concert was a kobzar himself - Terentiy Parkhomenko. (Apart from Parkhomenko the concert had performances by Ivan Kuchuhura Kucherenko, Mykhailo Kravchenko, Pavlo Hashchenko and Petro Drevchenko.)

== Popularity and critics ==
As an artist, Parkhomenko rose to fame in a relatively short period of time. - Notably having cigarette packets with his portrait on them.

Despite the popularity of Parkhomenko, there were anti-Parkhomenko writings in the press. The editor of the magazine "Ridniy krai" - Olena Pchilka - the mother of Lesia Ukrainka after hearing the performance of the kobzar at the Archeological conference in 1905 in Katerynoslav wrote:

..." The Chernihivite Parkhomenko - is of middle age, - this is a new kobzar a concert performer who has now gotten used to performing on stage, he is dress in a theatrical manner. he knows the words of dumy from books, and does not understand the melodies - he sings anything even a dance melody. he sang for us Morozenko."

A similar article was published by Pchilka in a review of a concert by five kobzars in Kyiv on 21 October 1908 - Parkhomenko - she wrote - "He can give to a sad duma a happy accompaniment. This cuts the ear, and only because no-one understands our dumy do people accept this."

Pchilka also wrote that Parkhomenko's voice was not good, but fresher than those other voiceless grandfathers and because of this Parkhomenko is successful. I feel that Parkhomenko gets applause just for the fact that he performs with the bandura and not for his performances. He sings without taste and understanding, and barely is able to play on the bandura."

== Death ==
After a period of success, he wound up living very poorly. In the spring of 1910, Parkhomenko was given a terrible beating by police. He became sick and did not have money to get medical care. At the age of 38, back in his native village of Voloskivtsi, he died of his injuries on 23 March 1910.

== Sources ==
- Mishalow, V. and M. - Ukrains'ki kobzari-bandurysty - Sydney, Australia, 1986
- "Kobzars", "Parkhomenko, Terentii," Encyclopedia of Ukraine, Vols. 2, 3 (Toronto: University of Toronto Press, 1988, 1993).
