= Vasyl' Potapenko =

Ukrainian bandurist (1886–1934)

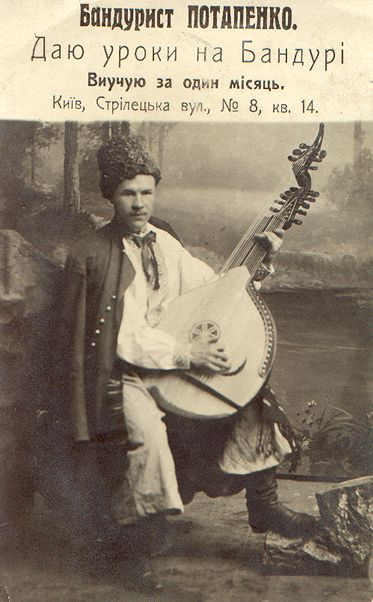
V. Potapenko advertising bandura lessons in 1925.

Vasyl' Potapenko (1886–1934) born in Berezna, Mensk region, Chernihiv province was the guide-boy for the blind kobzar Tereshko Parkhomenko. As a guide-boy he was a participant of the XIIth Archeological congress held in Kharkiv in 1902. He travelled to Halychyna by himself after discovering that Hnat Khotkevych had invited kobzars to perform there in 1909. When he discovered that the audiences in Halychyna had expected blind bandurists, he tried to blind himself by spraying caustic soda in his eyes. He returned to central Ukraine settling in Kiev where he made a living teaching bandura and re-selling banduras. Many of his students joined the Kiev Bandurist Capella in its second incarnation from 1924. He was a participant at the Xth historic-ethnographic concert held in Kiev in 1928. On October 15, 1930 Potapenko was arrested for being a member of "counter-revolutionary" (anti-Soviet) organizations. There were further arrests ending in his unexplained disappearance.

Potapenko made a significant contribution to the art of playing bandura. He was one of the bandurists who cemented the use of the Chernihiv style of bandura playing in Kiev, and in particular the drag technique exploited by Parkhomenko. After his arrest, he was treated typically as a "non-person" and written out of the history books.

== Sources ==
- Kudrytsky, A. V. - Mystetsvo Ukrainy - Biohrafichnyj dovidnyk - Kiev 1997
- Ukrainians in North America, USA
- Литвин, М. – Струни золотії – “Веселка”, К.:1994 (117с.)
- Мішалов, В. і М. Українські кобзарі-бандуристи – Сідней, Австралія, 1986 - 106с.
- Самчук, У. - Живі струни - Детройт, США, 1976 (468с.)
