= Hnat Honcharenko =

Ukrainian kobzar (1835–circa 1917)

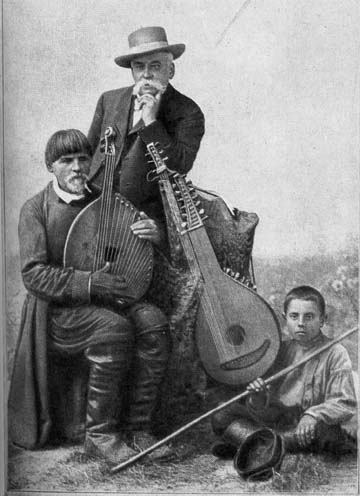
Hnat Honcharenko (left), Oleksandr Borodai with a torban, and Honcharenko's guide boy.

Hnat Tykhonovych Honcharenko (Гнат Тихонович Гончаренко, 1835–c. 1917) was one of the most renowned Ukrainian kobzars (blind itinerant minstrels) of the Kharkiv oblast of the late 19th and early 20th centuries.

== Biography ==
Hnat Honcharenko was born into a serf family in the village of Ripky. He lost his sight at the age of 3 or 4. Despite this adversity, he discovered his passion for music and began studying the bandura at the age of 22 under the guidance of the experienced kobzar Petro Kulibaba. His initial training lasted for four months, and he later continued his musical journey by learning from other kobzars he encountered.

After he married, he settled not far from Kharkiv on the Hubayenko homestead. When he was widowed, he resettled to Sevastopol with his son, a railway engineer. Honcharenko would spend his winters there and return to Kharkiv for the summer months.

Honcharenko had in his repertoire four dumy, epic poems set to music:

1. Oleksiy Popovych
2. The Poor Widow and Her Three Sons
3. The Sister and Brother
4. About the Escape of the three brothers from Oziv

He also sang numerous satirical-humorous songs and played instrumental dance melodies.

Hnat Honcharenko was first mentioned in the press by M. Sumtsov in 1885. In the January edition of "Kievan Antiquities", in the article "About a new variant of Olexiy Popovych", Sumtsov wrote that Honcharenko had visited Kharkiv numerous times and was familiar with various sacred and humorous songs, including the dumy "The Escape of the Three Brothers from Oziv" and "The Poor Widow".

The first recordings of dumy made from Honcharenko were made by Yu. Tykhovsky in 1899. These recordings were given to the organizers of the XIIth Archeological conference, but unfortunately were not published. Tykhovsky noted that Honcharenko was quiet and unassuming, that he played very well and sang distinctly, and that "it would be very nice to record from him his melodies and the musical accompaniment of the dumy".

Hnat Khotkevych regarded Honcharenko's performances very highly: "he is one of the most educated of all the kobzars. His appearance leaves an impression similar to a magical feeling. He, like his colleagues, wandered from village to village, singing at marketplaces and streets, but what is first observed is his cleanliness and outward appearance.... It could be assumed that he was like this at home, that he is always like this, and not just for the observer's eye.... As a virtuoso, with a limited repertoire. He did not have messy parts in his playing. Everything was performed clearly and artistically."

In 1908 Lesia Ukrainka, with her husband Klyment Kvitka, recorded on phonograph the singing of Hnat Honcharenko and these wax cylinders were sent to Filaret Kolessa in Lviv for transcription.

Filaret Kolessa stated:

Honcharenko's technique demonstrated true artistry. The tones from his fingers come out clearly and loudly, evenly played scalic passages changing from p to f, sounding clear chords at the end of periods and discreetly becoming quiet during his singing, giving a harmonic foundation for his recitation, or intertwining with the golden tapestry of fine fiorituras of his passages.... This is not simple accompaniment by repetition of 2-3 chords but an independent accompaniment copying the motives of the recitation, improvised in the same manner, like singing, and very lively: it gives the recitation a multicolored movement and lifted his expression of his musical declamation....

...Despite his limited repertoire, Honcharenko with his archaic method of recitation and bandura playing sets himself apart from the other live kobzars. He sings dumy in a quick recitation, clearly defining the accents, generally in his singing musical declamation takes precedence over the melodic element, the ancient dorian mode, with two melodic centres, with fourth and fifth groupings of the melody, the ending of the melody on the second degree of the scale, these are archaic characteristics, that distinguish Honcharenko as a singer of the old school, the inheritor of the best kobzar traditions...

...Looking at the recordings of his recitations made on phonograph, with his mastery accompaniments, we have the basis to feel that both Ostap Veresai and Hnat Honcharenko were two of the greatest kobzars that we have known.

Honcharenko died sometime around 1917. A more accurate date has not been ascertained.

== Students ==
- Horobetz
- Petro Drevchenko
- Erast Udiansky
- Hryhory Bajdykov
- Mykola Demchenko
- Pavlo Hashchenko
- Ivan Kuchuhura Kucherenko

== See also ==
- Ukrainian folk music

== Sources ==
- Mishalow, V. and M. (1986). Ukrayins’ki kobzari-bandurysty (Ukrainian Kobzars-Bandurists). Sydney, Australia.
- Humeniuk, A. (1967). Ukrayins’ki narodni muzychni instrumenty (Ukrainian folk musical instruments), p 79. Kiev, Ukraine.
