= Soviet kobzars =

Soviet kobzars were musicians in the Ukrainian SSR who performed at a stylised replacement for traditional Ukrainian kobzari, or bandurists. Bandurists were persecuted and executed in large numbers on the order of Stalin, who saw them as dangerous nationalists.

Their repertoire was primarily made up of censored versions of traditional kobzar repertoire and focused on stylized works that praised the Soviet system. Initially, some refused to play the new songs. Most of this music lost its traditional folk characteristics such as modal tunings, traditional folk melodic embellishments, playing style etc. These new performers were often also blind and although some actually had contact with the authentic kobzari of the previous generation, many received formal training in the Folk conservatories by trained musicians and played on contemporary chromatic concert factory made instruments.

The group includes performers such as Yevhen Adamtsevych, Petro Huz, and Yehor Movchan.

== See also ==
- Persecuted bandurists
