= Preservation of kobzar music =

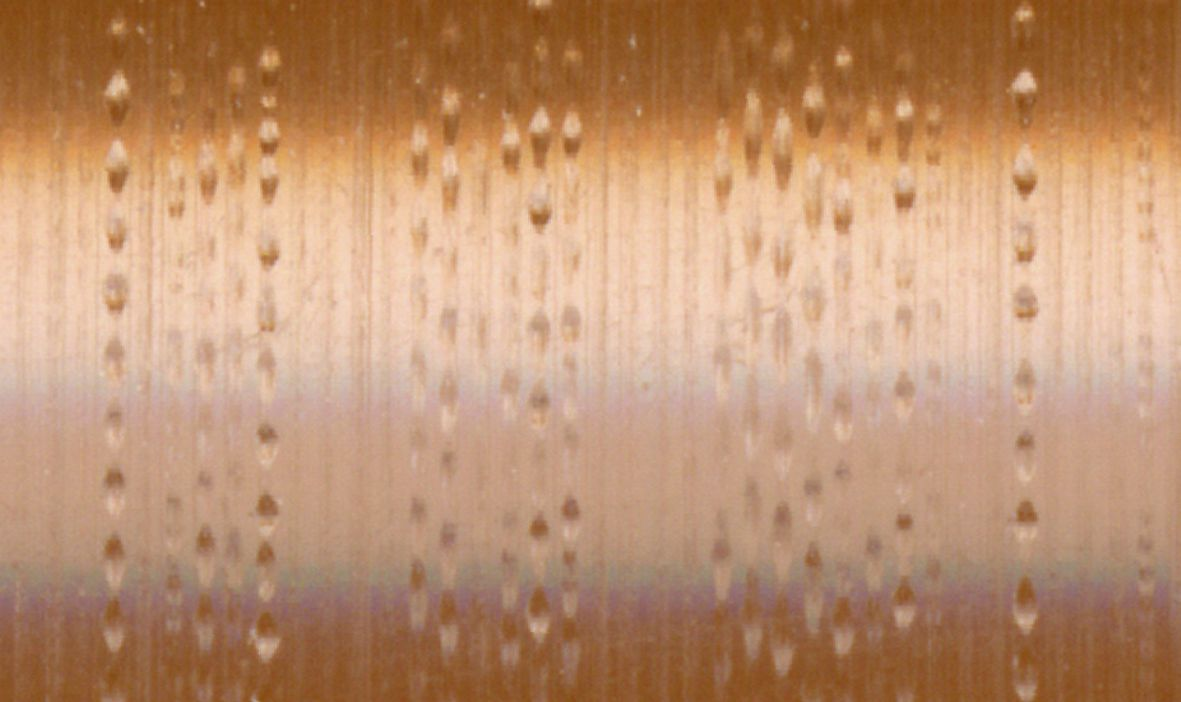
A cylinder from Kolessa's collection

The idea of the preservation of kobzar music by means of sound recording originated in 1901–02. Kobzars were itinerant Ukrainian folk musicians who sung dumas and folk songs to their own accompaniment of kobza, bandura or lira.

The 12th Archeological Congress was held in Kharkiv, now in Ukraine, then part of the Russian Empire. It was dedicated to Ukrainian folk music. During its preparation, the committee discussed a letter from Russian ethnographer Vsevolod Miller with the suggestion to using recently invented graphophone (Alexander Bell's version of phonograph, which used wax-coated cylinders). However, the suggestion was not accepted due to lack of money. Other people came with the same suggestion, both during the preparation and the sessions of the congress.

A team of Hnat Khotkevych (musicologist, bandurist, engineer, and ethnographer), Oleksandr Borodai (engineer and bandurist), and Opanas Slastion (artist and ethnographer), have eventually taken the job. Borodai bought several phonographs in America with his own money. The first records were taken for dumas of the noted kobzar Mykhailo Kravchenko. However, due to the conflict between Borodai and Khotkevych their work stopped in 1904. The work was restarted by the initiative Kvitka family, Kliment Kvitka and poet Lesya Ukrayinka, who put their money into the project. In 1908 they invited Ukrainian ethnographer Filaret Kolessa to do the job.

In later times there were attempts to recast the phonograph records by tape recording the phonograph playback. With the breakthroughs in non-destructive reading of wax cylinders, there were renewed attempts. In 2013, a member of the Wikimedia Ukraine team Yuri Bulka and folklorist Irina Dovgalyuk (who did research on Kolessa's collection) used a Wikimedia grant to digitize 56 cylinders and make the records available under the Creative Commons license.

In 1910 and 1913 Kolessa published two books of music deciphered from the collected phonograms. They were re-issued in 1969 as a book Мелодії українських народних дум (Tunes of the Ukrainian Folk Dumas), now available in "crowd-digitized" form.
