= Mykhailo Kravchenko =

Ukrainian kobzar (1858–1917)

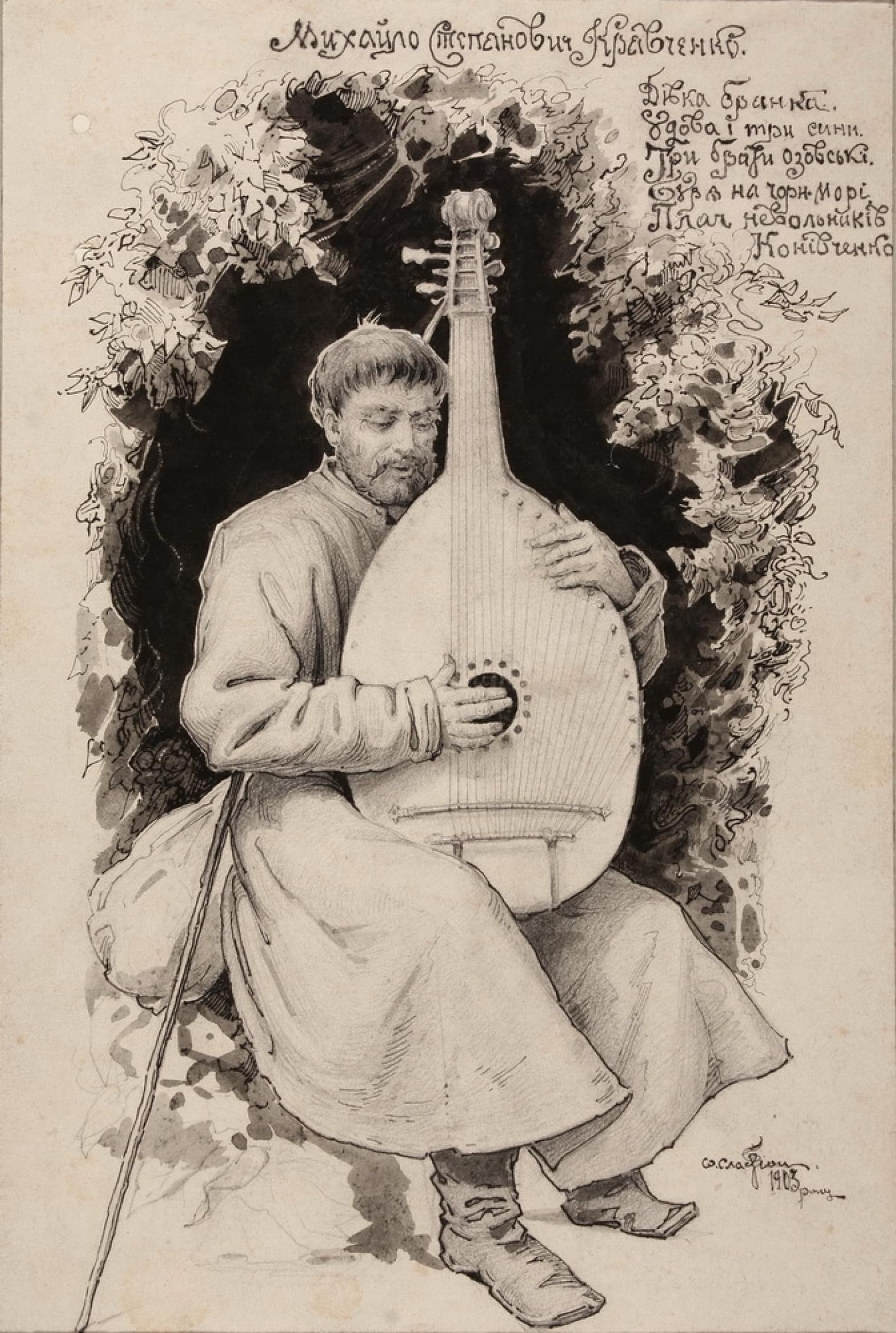
Portrait of kobzar M. Kravchenko by O. Slastion.

Mykhailo Stepanovych Kravchenko (Ukrainian: Кравченко Михайло Степанович; 1858-1917) was regarded as one of the most outstanding kobzars of Poltava province of the late 19th early 20th century.

== Biography ==
Kravchenko was born in Velyki Sorochyntsi, Myrhorod county in 1858. At the age of 15 he caught scrofula and lost his sight. At the age of 17 he began to learn to sing psalms from Samiylo Yashny. Under whom else he studied we do not know. Literature states that he spent 9 months studying under Fedir Hrytsenko-Kholodny, but in his discussion with Hnat Khotkevych, Kravchenko made no mention of this. It is assumed that he spent time with other kobzars after his apprenticeship with Yashny.

He was very poor because he not only supported his own family, but the family of his sick brother. In order to support two families he would also weave ropes for sale. This was a common occupation for the blind, but one which negatively influenced the art of the kobzar - "When you weave a ropes for a month - Kravchenko stated - from your fingertips 20 layers of skin would come off - how can you play?"

The Myrhorod artist Opanas Slastion became interested in Kravchenko in 1900. Slastion highly praised the artism of Kravchenko and wrote about him in an article published in "Kievan Antiquities." The article made Kravchenko famous among folklorists throughout Ukraine and beyond. The Russian Geographical Society invited Kravchenko to Saint Petersburg to take part in an artisans exhibition in 1902. In the fall of that same year he was invited to Kharkiv to the XIIth Archeological Conference. He also performed at the XIIIth Archeological Conference in Yekaterinoslav (modern Dnipropetrovsk) in 1905, and in 1906 at the artisans exhibition in Kiev. He was also invited to Moscow, where he performed at academic gatherings and ethnographic concerts.

At his performances at the XIIth Archeological Conference in Kharkiv, Hnat Khotkevych wrote: "...Extremely valuable in his playing and singing was his ability to sing in Ukrainian, with colorings which are not possible to notate, bending his voice with unusual fine melizmas and with his whole apparatus of performance, which was strikingly different from the professional."

Professor Mykola Sumtsov who was also involved with the organization of the conference wrote that the best performers were Terentiy Parkhomenko, Pavlo Drevchenko and Ivan Kucherenko. He did not include Kravchenko in his list. Kravchenko's renditions did not leave a deep impression on him.

The hard life Kravchenko led left its impact on the life of the kobzar. He died at the age of 59 - on April 22, 1917. Opanas Slastion had painted 5 portraits of the kobzar during the years of the most activity of the kobzar.

Mykhailo Kravchenko's last bandura was given to Opanas Slastion who gave it to the Myrhorod ethnographic museum where it lies today.

== Repertoire ==
During the expedition to collect dumy (sung epic poems) by Filaret Kolessa in Left-bank Ukraine in 1908 he recorded six dumy from M. Kravchenko.

1. The duma about the Captive's lament on a galley
2. The duma about the Captive's lament in Turkish slavery
3. The duma about the Escape of the three brothers from Oziv
4. The duma about Marusia Bohuslavka
5. The duma about the three Samara brothers
6. The duma about the poor widow and her three sons

At the end of 1905 there was a revolt in the village of Sorochyntsi which was brutal suppressed by tsarist Cossacks. The revolt and the subsequent repression were set by Kravchenko into two dumy: "The Sorochyntsi matters of 1905" and "Dark Sunday in Sorochyntsi".

=== Students ===
- Vasyl Shevchenko
- Andriy Voloshchenko
- Hudz

== Sources ==
- Mishalow, V. and M. - Ukrains'ki kobzari-bandurysty - Sydney, Australia, 1986
