= Vasyl Shevchenko =

Ukrainian bandurist and torbanist (1882–1964)

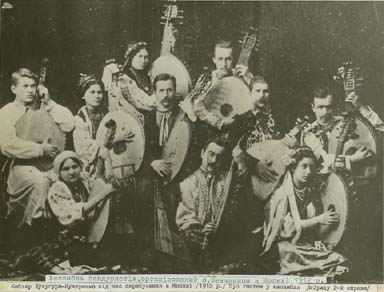
The Moscow Bandurist Capella directed by V. Shevchenko (sitting in the centre).

Vasyl' Kuzmych Shevchenko (Ukrainian: Василь Шевченко; 1882–1964) was one of the most active Ukrainian bandurists and torbanists at the turn of the 19-20th century.

== Biography ==
Very little is known about Schevchenko. We do know that he was a high school teacher in Moscow teaching singing, having also worked as a stagehand at the Bolshoi Theater. In 1904 he traveled to Poltava province and recorded dumy (sung epic poems) from the kobzars, in particular Mykhailo Kravchenko, and performed with his bandura in Poltava, Myrhorod, Reshetelivka and other cities.

From Mykola Lysenko's letters it can be seen that at one time negotiations were taking place for Shevchenko to teach bandura at Lysenko's music school in Kyiv, however it does not seem that they came to an understanding.

In 1912 Shevchenko organized a bandura ensemble in Moscow associated with the musical and dramatic group "Kobzar" which popularized the bandura amongst the general Muscovite population.

In 1914 he published a bandura handbook. It was originally planned in five parts, however the final two sections were not published. The manuscript of Shevchenko's "Bandura Primer" is currently located in the Central Museum of Musical Culture named after M. Glinka in Moscow, which also preserves his torban.
