= Zaporizhian March =

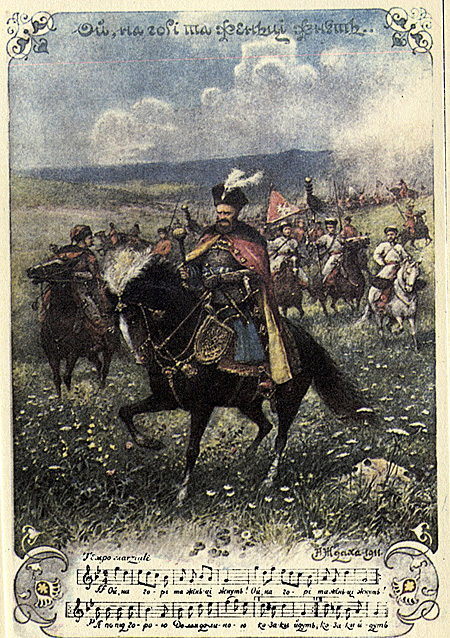
- Postcard «Hey, on the hilltop those reapers reap» with musical note by Amvrosiy Zhdakha (1911)

Instrumental
- Released: 1969
- Songwriter: Oleksa Yushchenko
- Composer: Yevhen Adamtsevych

Audio sample
- Zaporizhian March in the arrangement of Viktor Hutsal: file; help

Zaporizhian March (Ukrainian: Запорозький марш, romanized: Zaporoz'kyi marsh or Запорізький марш, Zaporiz'kyi marsh) is an expressive Ukrainian folk musical composition that was preserved and rearranged by bandurist Yevhen Adamtsevych.

The march became more famous after its arrangement by Viktor Hutsal who merged its tune with the folk song about Doroshenko and Sahaidachny (Hey, on the hilltop the reapers reap).

In modern Ukraine the piece serves as one of the official marches of the Armed Forces.

== History ==
=== Original composition ===
The now-famous instrumental composition was adopted and rearranged by Romny kobzar Yevhen Adamtsevych in 1926. Adamtsevych himself claimed his authorship of the march in his letter to folklorist Oleksandr Pravdyuk:

Now regarding Zaporizhian March.
In 1926 I heard the melody; the first part - from kobzar Ivan Kyrylovych Polozhai, the second part, the major one, I composed and after combining them together, gave the name to Zaporizhian March.

According to Pavlo Okhrimenko, a respected expert on the creativity and heritage of Adamtsevych, the march was co-authored with the bandurist's teacher Musiy Oleksiyenko, with the student picking up the first part of the composition and extending the tune. This point of view is confirmed in the memoirs of Oleksiyenko's children.

Some other sources mention Prokop Mormilya, a native talent from the village Yaduty, Borzna Raion (now Nizhyn Raion), Chernihiv Oblast whom Yevhen Adamtsevych visited, as possible creator of the march.

=== Initial performance and reception ===
Yevhen Adamtsevych first publicly performed the march in 1969 at a concert in the Kyiv Opera Theater of Taras Shevchenko. Eyewitnesses described the concert so:

In incredible gravitation of hearts for the tune people were raising from their seats. There exploded yet unheard under that vault a thunder of ovations.

I can hardly express what happened after the first performance of "Cossack March". Let me just say that the old Adamtsevych performed it at the request of the public three times. The agreement not to perform pieces more than two times was broken, but none of the fellow kobzars blamed Adamtsevych for repeating his performance. Although his music was wordless, but after carefully listening to the melody of "Zaporizhian March", none of the performers insisted on singing over the program.

It was clear: something extraordinary has just happened. Above the fascinated hall sparked and extinguished a wonderful moment which no one could hold or repeat.

— Serhiy Kozak (People's Artist of Ukraine), Polyovyi, R. Romny kobzar Yevhen Adamtsevych. Sumy Historic Portal. "Democratic Ukraine". December 1993.

Adamtsevych performed the march very expressively, vigorously, putting in all his skills and emotional imagery. But the fact that he played by pinching led to a lack of sonority. The conductor of the State Orchestra Viktor Hutsal recollected:

I realized that this piece should sound on a large scale and majestically. Writing a new march based on the old one became my primary objective.

=== Hutsal's rearrangement ===
Subsequently, the march was arranged for an orchestra by the chief conductor of the State Orchestra of National Instruments, Viktor Hutsal. On April 12, 1970, the orchestra performed Hutsal's remake of the march for the first time. The artistic director and conductor Yakiv Orlov repeated the piece ou bis several times.

== Composition ==
The main theme of the composition consists of syncopation and descending melodies created with the help of a technique in which bandurists play with fingers sliding on the strings. That technique was first used by bandura player Hnat Khotkevych in the instrumental accompaniment for his composition of a folk song about Baida (Poem of Baida, 1912), which he orchestrated in 1930.

== History of performances ==
Until 1974 the "Zaporozhian March" was performed at all concerts several times. The public always welcomed musicians standing. The composition became more famous after it was included in the soundtrack of Borys Ivchenko's film Propala Hramota (The Lost Deed) in 1972. After a performance of the march at the Bolshoi Theatre in Moscow, it became a focus of attention for party leaders, who were worried by the extremely heightened spiritual atmosphere among the audience. Communists carefully studied the notes, comparing them with songs of Sich Riflemen. Although no correspondences could be found, the march was banned, while Hutsal had to resign and join another band.

In 1984, "Zaporizhian March" was allowed to be performed again. It was played at rallies during the struggle for independence in the late 1980s. In our days the sounds of the march are used to assemble deputies in the Verkhovna Rada.

An arrangement of the march by S. Tvorun serves as one of the most popular marches of the Armed Forces of Ukraine under the name Cossack March. After 1991, this march replaced Farewell of Slavianka during recruitment days and official events of the Armed Forces.

"Zaporizhian March" entered the repertoire of the Ukrainian Orchestra of National Instruments. Hutsal's arrangement of the tune was published in Kyiv in 1995.

== See also ==
- "Prayer for Ukraine"
