= Petro Tkachenko =

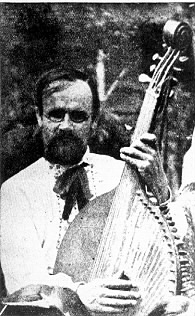
Petro Tkachenko.

Petro Fedorovych Tkachenko (December 21, 1878 in Syniavtsi – January 3, 1919) was a blind kobzar.

== Biography ==
Petro Fedorovych Tkachenko-Halashko was one of the more outstanding kobzars of the Chernihiv region. He was born on December 21, 1878, in the village of Syniavtsi, Sosnytsia county near Chernihiv. At the age of 9 he became blind. At the age of 16 he began an apprenticeship with the kobzar Andriy Hayduk (Haydenko) and after a short period continued with Tereshko Parkhomenko under whom he studied for three years. (Kornievsky states that he was partially sighted).

Tkachenko's repertoire consisted mainly of songs. Opanas Slastion wrote in 1906 that he knew three dumy (sung epic poems):

- The duma about the brother and sister
- The duma about the widow and her three sons
- The duma about the captives' lament

These dumy were performed by Tkachenko rarely, and as a consequence some ethnomusicologists state that he did not know any dumy at all.

Regarding his bandura technique, he played quite well. Although his voice was not the most exciting, he sang with passion and was able to move the listener.

Petro Tkachenko was widely traveled, performing in the cities of Chernihiv, Nizhyn, Konotop, Kharkiv, Poltava, Lokhvytsia, Pryluky, Pryiatyn, Kremenchuk, Mykolayiv and others. In 1905 he lived for two months in the home of the director of the Yekaterinoslav Historic Museum – academic Dmytro Yavornytsky, playing for the visitors of the museum, as an illustration for public lectures by this eminent historian.

Tkachenko died during the prime of his life living only 40 years, after a difficult illness (Typhus) on 3 January 1919.

For his noted accomplishments he was included in a list of prominent international cultural figures to be celebrated by UNESCO in 1977–78.

== Sources ==
- Mishalow, V. and M.- Ukrains'ki kobzari-bandurysty - Sydney, Australia, 1986
- Polotay, M - Kobzar Petro Tkachenko - Narodna Tvorchist' ta Etnohrafiya, 1978 #5 p. 71-2
