= Fedir Zharko =

Ukrainian kobzar and bandurist (1914–1986)

- Федір Жарко
- Born: 17 June 1914; Mykhailivka, Cherkasy province, Russian Empire
- Died: 17 July 1986 (aged 72)
- Education: Cherkasy Pedagogical Institute
- Occupations: Bandurist, singer, music teacher
- Years active: 1930s–1974
- Known for: Performing traditional Ukrainian *dumy*
- Awards: Merited Artist of Ukraine (1965)

Fedir Avramovych Zharko (4(17) June 1914 – 17 July 1986) is a Merited Artist of Ukraine (1965).

Fedir Zharko was one of the most renowned singers of dumy (sung epic poems) in Ukraine. He was born in 1914 in the village of Mykhailivka, Cherkasy province. From 1931 to 1936 Zharko studied at the Cherkasy Pedagogical Institute, completing his studies in Mathematics and Physics. Here he also became acquainted with the bandurist Vusatyj from the city of Chyhyryn, who inspired him to learn to play the bandura. From 1936 to 1940 up until World War II he worked as a village school teacher in Kyiv Oblast (province).

Initially he learned to play the bandura from Fedir Hlushko. After World War II he spent six years incarcerated in Irkutsk and Kolyma for being a village elder during the German occupation of Ukraine.

In 1945, after singing at a concert he was invited to join the Dumka chorus in Kyiv. In 1948 he became a member of the Kyiv Bandurist Capella where he spent some 25 years performing with the group until his retirement in 1974.

== Repertoire ==
From 1958 he recorded a large number of dumy and historic songs for the Melodia company, and published a number of collections of songs and dumy.(1967, 1969)

His repertoire included the following dumy (ten authentic and four contemporary dumy):

1. The Duma about the death of the Kozak Bandurist (Hlushko)
2. The Samara Brothers (Hlushko)
3. Captives lament (Hlushko)
4. Storm on the Black Sea -
5. The Oziv Brothers -
6. Kozak Holota -
7. Fedir the one without kin
8. Marusia Bohuslavka
9. About the sister and brother
10. About the poor widow and her three sons

Contemporary dumy-songs

1. About Lenin
2. It is not the Wind
3. Blood is not water
4. Freedom is coming

Zharko has also been the author of a number of songs and dumy.

=== Publications ===
- Ukrains'ki narodni pisni dlia holosu v suprovodi bandury
- Yuni spivaky-bandurysty

== Sources ==
- Omelchenko, A. F. - Banduryst Fedir Zharko // NTE, 1975 #3
- Omel'chenko, A. F. - Poklykannia // Muzyka, 1979 #2, p. 24
- Nemyrovych, I. - Vziav by ia banduru - Kiev, 1986
