= Borodai =

Borodai or Boroday (Ukrainian: Бородай) is a Ukrainian surname. It may refer to:

- Alexander Borodai (born 1972), Russian politician
- Alexei Borodai (born 1947), Russian cosmonaut
- Oleh Boroday (born 1993), Ukrainian footballer
- Oleksandr Borodai (1844–1919), Ukrainian and American bandurist
- Tatyana Boroday (born 1972), Russian Olympic archer
- Vasyl Borodai (1917–2010), Ukrainian sculptor
