= Petro Drevchenko =

Ukrainian kobzar (1863–1934)

Petro Drevchenko Петро Древченко
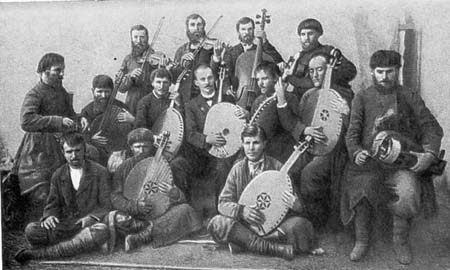
- Drevchenko at the 1902 conference in Kharkiv

Background information
- Born: 1863; Poltava Governorate, Russian Empire (present-day Ukraine)
- Died: 1934 (aged 70–71); Possibly Kharkiv, Ukrainian SSR, Soviet Union
- Genres: Folk
- Occupation: Kobzar
- Instrument: Bandura

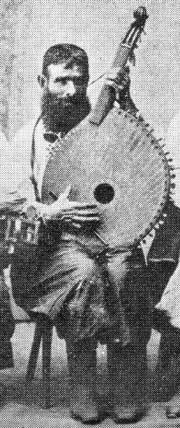
Petro Drevchenko.

Petro Semenovych Drevchenko (Note: Ukrainian: Петро Семенович Древченко, romanized: Petro Semenovych Drevchenko, sometimes given as Ukrainian: Древкін, Дриґавка, romanized: Drevkin, Drygavka) (Ukrainian: Петро Семенович Древченко, 1863 – 1934), was a Ukrainian kobzar.

== Biography ==
Drevchenko was born in 1863 in the Poltava Governorate of the Russian Empire (in present-day Ukraine) to a family of servants. From the age of 12 he lived in Kharkiv, in the area of Zalutin. At the age of 13 he came down with the mumps and lost his sight. At 14 he was apprenticed to kobzar Hnat Honcharenko for 4 years and at 18 completed his apprenticeship and received permission to become an independent kobzar. At the age of 20 he was married.

Kryst wrote that Drevchenko reminded one of his teacher - Hnat Honcharenko. He had a fidgety character and was given the name Drygavka (meaning "spinning top"). He travelled around considerably giving numerous performances. Of the kobzars of the early 20th century he made public significant sections of the Ustynski books. He often performed with lirnyk Ivan Zozulia.

He participated in the XIIth Archeological Congress in Kharkiv in 1902. According to Heorhy Tkachenko Drevchenko's performance in 1922 at the opening of the Artem museum to celebrate the 200th anniversary of Hryhory Skovoroda aided significantly in raising his popularity.

Drevchenko's playing technique was admired by Mykola Lysenko who at one time considered him for a position to teach bandura at his music school in Kiev.

Filaret Kolessa noted that Drevchenko had characteristics of stage performance in his dumy (sung epic poems) renditions but when compared to Ivan Kuchuhura Kucherenko, Drevchenko's recitations were more faithful to their archaic base.

In Soviet times, Drevchenko took up a number of social causes such as the right for kobzars to perform on the streets. Together with the kobzars Pavlo Hashchenko, Stepan Pasiuha, H. Tsybko they created the duma “About the Red Army.” Heorhy Tkachenko regarded Drevchenko to be his teacher.

Drevchenko later was persecuted by the Soviet authorities. He died in 1934, possibly in Kharkiv. The circumstances of his death are not clear but it is assumed that he died during the Holodomor.

== Sources ==
- Черемський, К. П. Повернення традиції / К. Черемський. – Х.: Центр Леся Курбаса. – 1999. – 288 с.
- Черемський, К. П. Шлях звичаю / – Х.: Глас. – 2002. – 444 с.
