= Ostap Veresai =

Ukrainian kobzar (1803–1890)

- Остап Вересай
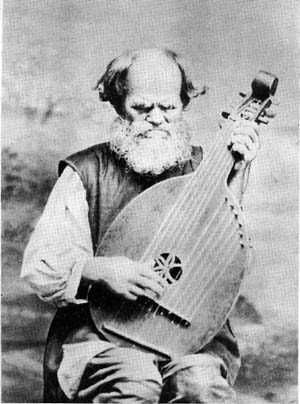
- Veresai in 1890
- Born: 1803 selo Kalyuzhintsy, Priluksky Uyezd, Poltava Governorate
- Died: April 1890 (aged 86–87)
- Occupations: Minstrel; kobzar
- Father: Nikita Veresai

Ostap Mykytovych Veresai (Ukrainian: Остап Микитович Вересай; 1803 – April 1890) was a renowned minstrel and kobzar from the Poltava Governorate (now Chernihiv oblast) of the Russian Empire (now Ukraine). He helped to popularize kobzar art both within Ukraine and beyond. He is noted for influencing both scholarly and popular approaches to minstrelsy.

== Biography ==
=== Childhood ===
Veresai was born in 1803 in the village of Kaliuzhentsi, Pryluky county, Poltava Governorate into a family of musicians. He was the only child of a serf family. His father, Mykyta Veresai, was a congenitally blind violinist. At age 4, Veresai fell ill and lost his sight.

From an early age, Veresai was interested in music and the bandura. He was quoted later in life: "...when a kobzar came to my father's house, I would stand near him, and I do not know who was more excited. The kobzar would suggest: 'You Mykyto give this boy to learn, maybe he becomes a kobzar.'"

At age 15, Veresai's father apprenticed him to a kobzar in the village of Berezivka, where Veresai spent only one week. After spending four years at home, Veresai again attempted to undertake studies under a kobzar; he and a neighbor traveled to the market in Romen, where many kobzars would gather. There, Veresai met the kobzar Yefym Andriyshevsky and became formally apprenticed to him. For several months, the apprenticeship was successful with Veresai learning much from his mentor. However, after several months, Andriyshevsky died.

After Andriyshevsky's death, Veresai was apprenticed to Semen Koshoviy from the nearby village of Holinka. Veresai spent 9 months apprenticed to Koshoviy, who he found to be strict and exploitative. Veresai thus spent a total of nine months in apprenticeship instead of the traditional three years. After this, Veresai decided to embark a musical career on his own. For a time, he was merely a simple entertainer in villages without any hope of a further career. This changed when he befriended the Russian folklorist and painter Lev Zhemchuzhnikov.

=== Popularity ===
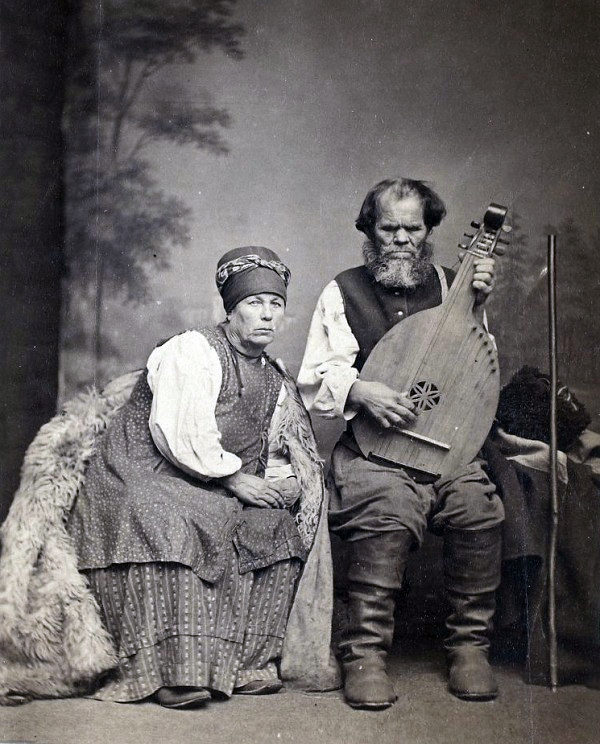
Ostap Veresai with his wife. Photo taken in 1873 during the Archeological Congress in Kyiv.

Veresai first attracted the attention of Zhemchuzhnikov during his Sabbatical in Ukraine between 1852 and 1856. The painter visited the Galagan estate in Sokyryntsi, Ternopil Oblast, where Veresai was married and lived at the time. After their meeting, Zhemchuzhnikov and Veresai became friends.

In 1871, Hryhoriy Galagan took Veresai to Kiev for the opening of the "Pavlo Galagan Collegium" to introduce the kobzar from Sokyryntsi to his guests. Veresai had, up until that moment, only performed in a village setting. It is possible that it is on this trip Mykola Lysenko recorded the melodies of dumas (sung epic poems) and songs which became the basis for his monograph The characteristics of musical peculiarities of Ukrainian dumas and songs performed by the kobzar Veresai. The ethnographer Pavlo Chubinsky also recorded almost all of the texts to the songs and dumas which Veresai had in his repertoire.

In 1873, the directors of the Southwestern Branch of the Imperial Russian Geographic Society, chaired by Galagan, held an unscheduled meeting of the Society at Galagan's request with the goal of introducing Veresai to its members as an example of ancient Ukrainian poetic works. At the meeting, which was attended by 28 members and 60 invited guests, the following papers were read:

1. "Ostap Veresai – one of the last Ukrainian kobzars", by O. Rusov
2. The Characteristics of musical peculiarities of Ukrainian dumas and songs performed by the kobzar Veresai", by Mykola Lysenko.

At this meeting, Veresai performed the dumas The Escape of the three brothers from Oziv from Turkish Captivity, About Fedir the one without kin (Fedor Bezrodny), the humorous song Shchyhol, and the dance melody Kozachok. Veresai received significant attention and was claimed to be the last of his kind. After this meeting, Veresai performed at a number of other academic conferences.

Veresai gained further fame for his performance of Duma about Fedor Bezrodny and other works on August 29, 1874, at the third Russian Archaeological Conference, which began on August 14, 1874, in Kiev. His performance in this event attracted European interest in Ukrainian Duma. It was covered by the London magazine Atheneum, which published both a summary of the conference as well as an article by the folklorist and writer William Ralston Shedden-Ralston, which compared Veresai to the rhapsodes of ancient Greece. French conference delegate Alfred Rambaud also wrote of Veresai's performance in an article titled "Ukraine and its historic songs":

One wonderful summer evening we gathered in the University garden to listen to the kobzar; he was seated on a stool, and the listeners, whose numbers continued to grow, sat down around him. One lamp, hiding in the greenery, lit up the face of the kobzar, whose voice sounded clearly like the song of a nightingale ... When Ostap performed one of his humorous songs, it is worth while looking at the way he would dance to the accompaniment of the music, while playing difficult notes on the bandura. The same can be said about the dancing motive, to which he would beat time with his foot; at this time one could take him as a young kozak, watching how he would make knee bends as if doing kozak dances ... His life is different from those Homeric tales. The villager Ostap Veresai is a direct descendant of the ancient Slavonic singers, he is the legal inheritor of the Boyan and other nightingales of the past...

In February 1875, Veresai was invited by the ethnographic sector of the Russian Geographical Society to Saint Petersburg. There, he performed at meetings of the ethnographic sector and the painters' guild; at a breakfast organized in memory of Taras Shevchenko; and at the Winter Palace before Princes Sergey and Pavel Alexandrov. Veresai was received by full halls and positive reviews by Saint Petersburg press outlets. The newspaper Novosti wrote:

The singer—a seventy-year-old man, is able to capture the listeners sympathy, and his singing, which is marked by deep artistry and much feeling leaves a deep impression with the listeners. According to the experts, Veresai as a singer, was born with a talent and through his dumas would bring to life ancient Ukraine, with numerous reminiscences of the past

Veresai's popular success in Saint Petersburg allowed him to pay for the construction of a larger house for his family of 15 in Sokyryntsi. Like Hnat Honcharenko, Veresai was persecuted in Russia as a propagator of Ukrainian interest and historical memory.

=== Later life and death ===
In the autumn of 1881 and spring of 1882, Veresai traveled to Kiev, where the folklorist K. Ukhach-Oxorovych made a complete recording of his repertoire; in comparison with that made by Pavlo Chubinsky in 1873, it showed that the 70-year-old kobzar was able to expand his repertoire to include three additional dumy. At the beginning of the 1880s, Veresai had in his repertoire nine dumy:

1. Storm on the Black Sea
2. The recruitment of the Kozak
3. The Escape of the three brothers from Oziv
4. The poor widow and her three sons
5. The Hawk and the Hawklette
6. Fedir the one without Kin
7. The Captive's lament, son of a widow
8. Ivan Konovchenko

Veresai died in April 1890 at the age of 87 in Sokyryntsi.

== Cultural impact ==
Through his performances, Veresai inspired the creation of the genre known as dumky (small dumy). Following his performances in Saint Petersburg, Eastern European composers such as Antonín Dvořák, Peter Tchaikovsky, Modest Mussorgsky, Leoš Janáček, Bohuslav Martinů, Mykola Lysenko, Vasyl Barvinsky, Mily Balakirev, Maria Zawadsky, Vladislav Zaremba, and Sylvia Zaremba wrote many dumky.

Veresai's performances in Saint Petersburg may have influenced the creation of the Ems ukaz in 1876, which banned the use of the Ukrainian language in print. Paragraph 3 specifically banned the performance of vocal works in the Ukrainian language on stage, which may have been a direct response to Lysenko and Veresai's lectures and performances. Stage performances by kobzars were only allowed again in 1902 after the XIIth Archeological conference.

== Books ==
- Mishalow, V. and M. - Ukrains'ki kobzari-bandurysty – Sydney, Australia, 1986
