= Russian Archeological Congress =

A series of Russian Archeological Congresses began in 1867. The aim of these conferences was to discuss and to make public studies dealing with matters of antiquity and ethnography. The Conferences were held in a different city every three years.

== The IIIrd Archeological Congress ==
The 3rd Archeological Congress was held in Kiev in 1873 and featured performances by the renowned kobzar (traditional Ukrainian Cossack bard) - Ostap Veresai.

== The XIIth Archeological Congress ==
See 12th Archeological Congress for more detail The XIIth Archeological Congress was held in Kharkiv in 1902, and again featured kobzar and bandurist performances and detailed discussions of this traditional art form.

== The XIIIth Archeological Congress ==
The XIIIth Archeological Congress took place in Yekaterinoslav (modern Dnipropetrovsk) in 1905.

== Sources ==
- Humeniuk, A. - Ukrainski narodni muzychni instrumentsy - Kiev 1967, p. 79.
