= Heorhy Tkachenko =

Ukrainian bard (1898–1993)

- Георгій Ткаченко
- Born: May 5, 1898; Glushkovo, Russian Empire (now Russia)
- Died: 1993 (aged 94–95); Kyiv, Ukraine
- Occupation(s): Bard, bandurist

Heorhiy Kyrylovych Tkachenko (Note: Ukrainian: Георгій Кирилович Ткаченко, romanized: Heorhii Kyrylovych Tkachenko) (5 May 1898 – 1993) was a Ukrainian bard and bandurist.

== Biography ==
Tkachenko completed his secondary education in the Kharkiv Art School before continuing in Moscow, where he completed his tertiary education in Vkhutemas, graduating as an architect in 1929. He continued to live in Moscow where he designed many of the parks around the city centre. He also professionally worked as a painter, teacher of aquarelle at the Moscow Architectural Institute before he moved to Kyiv in 1964.

Tkachenko was also known as a bandurist. He was the last living example of the Slobozhan bandura tradition playing on a traditional folk bandura. His repertoire included many spiritual works and dumy. He had a significant following amongst the Ukrainian intellectuals from the mid 1960–1990s and is considered the founder of a movement of authentic performance practice on Ukrainian folk instruments.

Tkachenko studied the kobzar art from Slobozhan kobzar Petro Drevchenko. Tkachenko's repertoire included eight dumy (sung epic poems), five psalms, twelve historic songs 29 folk songs and 5 dances.

== Recordings ==
Numerous non-professional recordings have been released on CD and a number of Tkachenko's performances have been recorded on film and video. A number have been uploaded to YouTube.

== Publications ==
- Ткаченко Г. Зустріч з Єгором Мовчаном // Народна творчість та етнографія (Київ). – 1978. – № 3. – С. 49-54.
- Акварелі Георгія Ткаченка.– К.: Мистецтво, 1989. – Комплект із 15 листівок з передмовою та коментарями укр. і рос. мовами. – Упорядник і автор тексту М. Селівачов.
- Ткаченко Г. Струна до струни // Україна (Київ).. – 1988. – № 19, травень. – С. 24-25.
- Георгій Ткаченко: Автобіографія. Школа гри на народній бандурі. Репертуар / Упорядкував М. Селівачов // Родовід. – 1995. – № 11. – С. 111-114
- Ткаченко, Г. К. Струна до струни / Г. Ткаченко // Егор Мовчан. Спогади. Статті. Матеріали. – Суми: Собор, 1999. – 64 с.
- Ткаченко, Г. К. Основи гри на народній бандурі / Г. Ткаченко // Черемський К. Повернення традиції. – Х.: Центр Леся Курбаса, 1999. – С.224-225

== Sources ==
Акварелі Георгія Ткаченка.– К.: Мистецтво, 1989. – Комплект із 15 листівок з передмовою та коментарями укр. і рос. мовами. – Упорядник і автор тексту М. Селівачов.

- Вітрук Володимир. Творчість Єгора Ткаченка // Наша культура (Варшава). – 1969. – № 2 (130). – С. 7-8.
- Голець Ярослав. Мальовнича Україна // Україна (Київ). – 1978. – № 40. – С. 17.
- Грица С. Й. Епос у виконанні Георгія Кириловича Ткаченка // Народна творчість та етнографія (Київ). – 1988. – № 2. – С. 52-60.
- Каталог виставки акварелей Георгія Кириловича Ткаченка (до 90-річчя від його народження) / упорядник Н. Селівачова. – К., 1988. – 25 с., портрет Г. Ткаченка (ксилографія) роботи В. Перевальського. – Бібліографія – с. 10-13.
- Лавров Федір. - Кобзарі: нариси з історії кобзарства України. – К.: Мистецтво, 1980. – С. 170.
- Литвин Микола. - Довгожитель пензля і пісні // Україна (Київ). – 1984. – № 47, 25 листопада. – С. 22 і 4 стор. обкл.
- Литвин Микола. - Кобзарі задивлені в майбутнє // Жовтень (Львів). – 1986. – № 11. – С. 85-96.
- Мішалов, В. – Георгій Кирилович Ткаченко – Останній кобзар – ж. Молода Україна, Червень, 1985
- Мішалов, В. – Останній кобзар – Нарис про Г. Ткаченка - "Bandura", 1985, №13.14, (С.49-52)
- Піаніда Б. М. - Виставка творів Г. К. Ткаченка // Народна творчість та етнографія (Київ). – 1978. – № 4. – С. 103-106.
- Selivatchov M. - His unique world // Ukraine (Kyiv). – 1985. – № 8. – P. 13-15.
- Селівачов М. - Відзначення 100-річчя від дня народження Георгія Ткаченка // Родовід. – 1999. – № 1 (17). – С. 98-99.
- Селівачов М. - Вічна загадка любові // Київ. – 1984. – № 2. – С. 155-159.
- Селівачов М. - Георгій Ткаченко // Ант. – 1999. – № 1. – С. 35.
- Селівачов М. - Георгій Ткаченко: особистість, паломник, художник, музикант (спогади про незабутнього друга та його розповіді) // Лаврський альманах. Випуск 25. – К., 2010. – С. 135-153, іл; репринт: // Сучасні проблеми дослідження, реставрації та збереження культурної спадщини. Випуск 7. – К., 2010. – С. 394-427.
- Фисун Олександр. Етнографічні акварелі Георгія Ткаченка // Народна творчість та етнографія (Київ). – 1968. – № 6. – С. 82-87.
- Селівачов М. - Останній бандурист // Родовід. – 1993. – № 6. – С. 55-60;
- Селівачов М. - Пам’яті найстарішого кобзаря України Георгія Ткаченка // Народна творчість та етнографія. – 1994. – № 2-3. – С. 88-89.
- Селівачов М. - Співець рідної землі // Життя і слово (Торонто). – 1974, 7 січня.
- Христенко Інна - Дзвін кобзи // Літературна Україна. – 1983. – 10 лютого, № 6 (3999). – С. 8.
