= Yevhen Adamtsevych =

Ukrainian bandurist (1904–1972)

Yevhen Adamtsevych Євген Адамцевич

Background information
- Born: 1 January 1904; Solonytsia, Russian Empire (now Ukraine)
- Died: 19 November 1972 (aged 68) Kholmivka, Ukrainian SSR, Soviet Union (now Autonomous Republic of Crimea, Ukraine)
- Genres: Folk music
- Instrument: Bandura
- Years active: 1927–1972

Yevhen Oleksandrovych Adamtsevych (Ukrainian: Євге́н Олекса́ндрович Адамце́вич; 1 January 1904 [O.S. 19 December 1903] – 19 November 1972) was a Ukrainian blind bandurist.

== Biography ==
Yevhen Oleksandrovych Adamtsevych was born in the village of Solonytsia on 1 January 1904, not far from the town of Lubny, in what is now Ukraine's Poltava Oblast. His father, who came from Snovsk, worked at one time at the railway station at Solonytsia, possibly as the station master. His mother was Maria Mykhailivna (née Bilan), the middle class daughter of a tailor whose five children were all educated at home.

Adamtsevych became blind at the age of two. He was educated at a school for the blind in Kyiv. He lived in Romny where from 1925 he was apprenticed to the kobzar Musii Petrovych Oleksienko, who taught him to play the bandura.

Adamtsevych began to perform as a soloist in 1927, where he led a group of bandurists. In 1927 he married Lidia Dmytrivna Paradis; her relatives did not approve of this marriage and were only reconciled years later. During the 1930s, he was a travelling kobzar. In 1939 he participated in the conference of kobzars which took place in Kyiv, and he participated in a 1940 conference on folk singers in Moscow.

During the Second World War, Adamtsevych travelled around Ukraine, performing patriotic songs, including his own composition, the song "Unwillingly". During the 1950s and 1960s, he and other bandurists gave concerts in Ukraine and Russia.

In October 1972, Adamtsevych and his wife moved to live with their daughter in the village of Kholmivka, Bakhchysaray District, Crimea. Three weeks later, he was hospitalized with acute pain caused by a stone in his gall bladder, but died during the early hours of 20 November whilst on the operating table. He bequeathed his bandura to the Taras Shevchenko Museum in Kaniv.

== Playing and singing style ==
Adamtsevych acted as a bearer of the national Ukrainian traditions of singing and playing the bandura, which he learned his repertoire directly through oral transmission. A characteristic feature of Adamtsevych's singing style was his ability to highlight syllables or words; the range of his voice covered two octaves. he was known for being able to easily memorize the music and lyrics of any songs that he listened to.

== Personality ==
Adamtsevych's daughter recalled her father as being was energetic, cheerful, and neat. He did not have a haircut, but shaved his head "according to Kotovskyi". According to his daughter, "He did everything himself: he sawed and chopped firewood, repaired the house, built it, even roofed the house himself with iron, dug cellars and covered it with bricks." Adamtsevich attempted unsuccessfully to teach his daughter Tetyana to play the bandura.

== Repertoire ==
Adamtsevych's repertoire included many historic Ukrainian folk songs, but lacked any authentic dumy (sung epic poems). Yevshan-Zillia, the single epic work in his repertoire, was structured like a duma.

Adamtsevych composed the "Zaporizhian March", which was orchestrated by Viktor Hutsal. The march was played regularly by the Ukrainian State Orchestra of Ukrainian Folk Instruments in Kyiv. Other compositions include the songs "In Captivity" (1941), and "Thoughts about I.F. Fedka" (1966).

== Sources ==
- Skrypnyk, Anna, ed. (2006). "Adamtsevych, Yevhen Oleksandrovych". Encyclopedia of the Music of Ukraine (PDF) (in Ukrainian). Vol. 1. Rylsky Institute of Art Studies, Folklore and Ethnology. pp. 29–30. Archived from the original (PDF) on 7 January 2021.
- Zheplinsky, B.M.; Kovalchuk, D.B. (2011). Українські кобзарі, бандуристи, лірники: Енциклопедичний довідник [Ukrainian kobzars, bandurists, lyrniks: an encyclopedic guide] (PDF). Lviv. pp. 1–135. ISBN 978-966-1633-26-0.
