= Stepan Pasiuha =

Ukrainian kobzar

Stepan Pasiuha Степан Пасюга
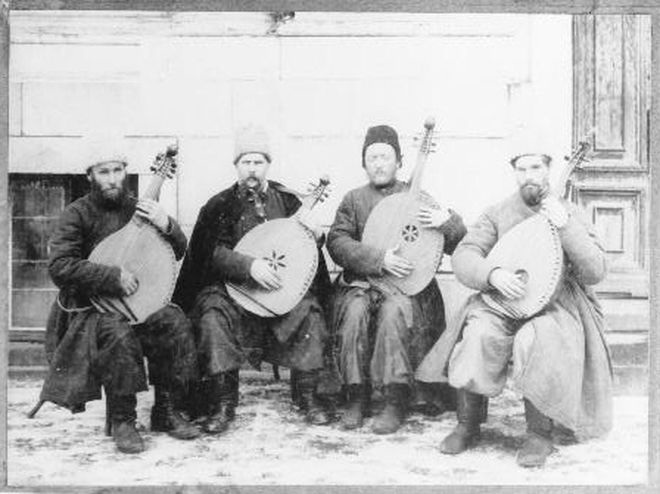
- Pasiuha (left) in 1912

Background information
- Born: 11 December 1862; Velyka Pysarivka, Kharkov Governorate, Russian Empire (present-day Ukraine)
- Died: 1933 (aged 70–71)
- Genres: Folk
- Occupations: Kobzar; Bandurist
- Instrument: Bandura

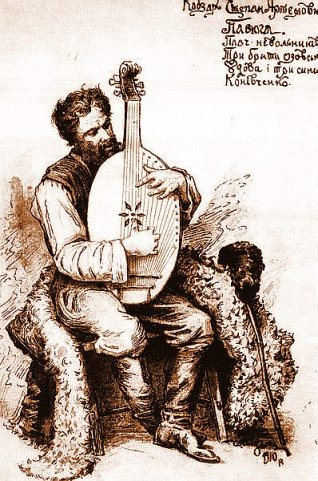
Portrait of Stepan Pasiuha by Opanas Slastion, 1910

Stepan Artemovych Pasiuha (Note: Ukrainian: Степан Артемович Пасюга, romanized: Stepan Artemovych Pasiuha) (11 December 1862 – 1933) (Note: Zheplynsky states that he was born on 29 November 1862, which is the Julian date. The Gregorian calendar is ten days ahead of the Julian Calendar) was a Ukrainian kobzar.

== Biography ==
Stepan Pasiuha was born in the town Velyka Pysarivka, Bohodukhiv County, in the Kharkov Governorate of the Russian Empire (present-day Ukraine). He learned to play the bandura from Dmytro Trochenko. He had seven dumy (sung epic poems) in his repertoire:

- 1. Marusia Bohuslavka
- 2. The Widow and Her Three Sons
- 3. The Sister and Brother
- 4. Oleksiy Popovych
- 5. Captives lament
- 6. Ivan Konovchenko, the Widow's Son
- 7. The Escape of the Three Brothers from Oziv

The first three dumy were recorded on a phonograph by Opanas Slastion and sent to Filaret Kolessa in Lviv. Filaret Kolessa wrote that : "In his recitations, sung with a nice baritone, we hear the importance of the recitative above the melody. The singing and playing of Stepan Pasiuha makes a nice artistic impression."

Yehor Movchan was a student of Pasiuha, and highly praised him as a teacher of singing and playing, and also as a kobzar who demonstrated great artistry in his performance of dumy. He often spoke: "there probably was never such a kobzar like Pasiuha and in the future there never will be."

In 1915, Pasiuha was arrested and spent time incarcerated.

From graphic sources his bandura had:

- Portrait 1 – 4 basses and 14 treble strings (16 pegs)
- Portrait 2 – 6 basses and 14 treble strings

== Students ==
- Hryhory Kozhushko
- Yehor Movchan
- Heorhy Tkachenko

== Sources ==
- Mishalow, V. and M.: Ukrains'ki kobzari-bandurysty, Sydney, Australia, 1986
