= Sokyryntsi, Ternopil Oblast =

Sokyryntsi Сокиринці
- Village
- Location within Ternopil Oblast
- Coordinates: 48°56′55″N 26°12′17″E
- Country: Ukraine
- Oblast: Ternopil Oblast
- District: Chortkiv Raion
- Area: 1.270 km^{2} (0.490 sq mi)
- Elevation: 217 m (712 ft)
- Population: 253
  - Density: 199.21/km^{2} (516.0/sq mi)
- Website: село Сокиринці^{(Ukrainian)}

Sokyryntsi (also Sokyrynci, Ukrainian: Соки́ринці, Polish: Siekierzyńce) is a village located at the Zbruch River in Chortkiv Raion (district) of Ternopil Oblast (province in western Ukraine). Local government — Sokyrynetska village council. It belongs to Husiatyn settlement hromada, one of the hromadas of Ukraine.

The village of Sokyryntsi is situated in the 99 kilometres (62 mi) from the regional center Ternopil, 42 kilometres (26 mi) from the district center Chortkiv and 23 kilometres (14 mi) from Husiatyn.

The first mention of Sokyryntsi dates from the year 1493. The Archeological sights from Trypillian and Chernyakhov culture were found near the village.

== Literature ==
- History of Towns and Villages of the Ukrainian SSR, Lvov region. — К. : ГРУРЕ, 1968 р. (in Ukrainian)
- (in Ukrainian) Н. Совінська, Б. Хаварівський, В. Ханас, Сокиринці // Ternopil Encyclopedic Dictionary: in 4 v. / editorial board: H. Yavorskyi and other, Ternopil: "Zbruch", 2008, V. 3: П—Я, S. 306. — ISBN 978-966-528-279-2.
- Holos narodu N 34 (8318), August 24, 2011. “My kraplyny yedynoyi riky” (in Ukrainian)
- Sabine von Löwis. "Phantom borders and ambivalent spaces of identification in Ukraine". L'Espace géographique, Volume 46(2), 2017.
