= Maria Bohuslavka =

Legendary heroine

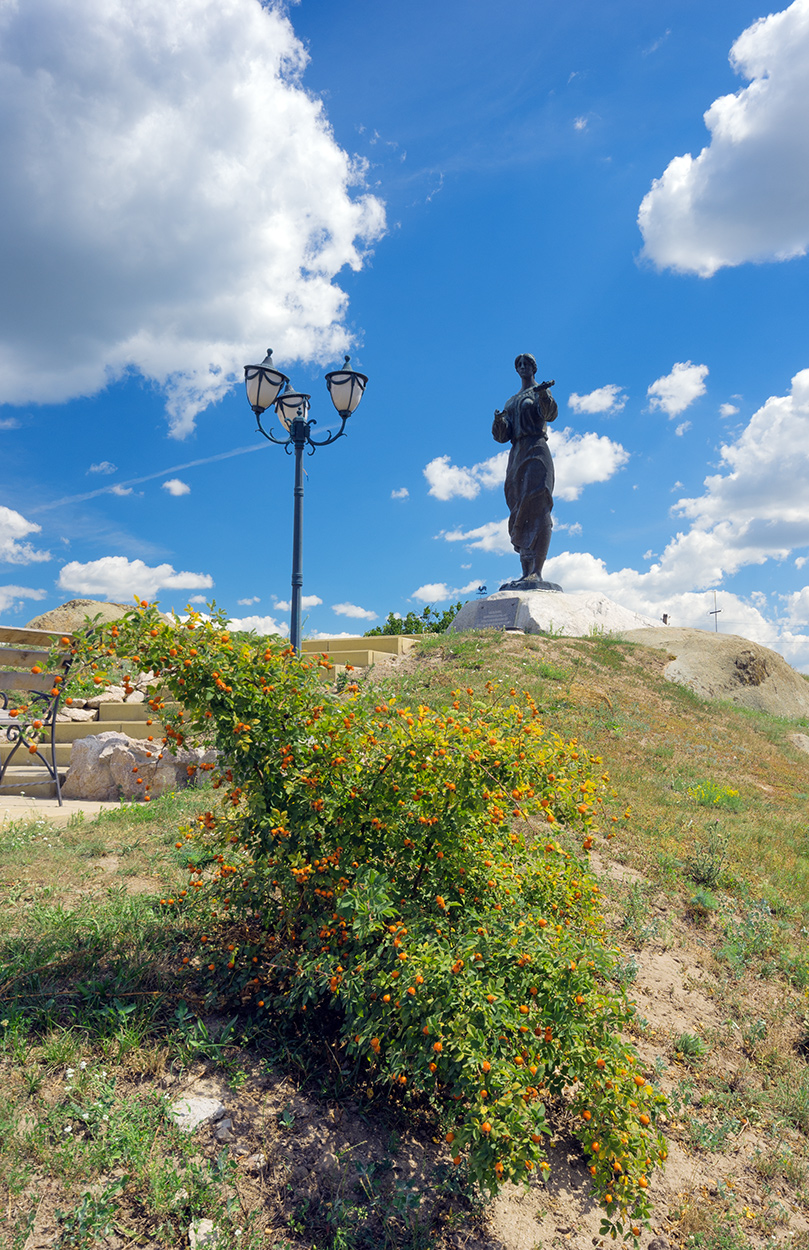
Statue of Marusia Bohuslavka in a local park in Bohuslav

Marusia Bohuslavka was a legendary heroine who lived in Ukraine in the 16th or 17th century. She is primarily known from many dumas, usually referred to as the Duma about Marusya Bohuslavka. Her nickname Bohuslavka refers to her origin, the city of Bohuslav.

The Duma about Marusya Bohuslavk was first written down during the first half of the 1850s by the kobzar Ryhorenko, who came from the village of Krasnokutsk. It was printed in Notes on Southern Rus. More than 25 versions of the duma were recorded between 1850 and 1932. The Ukrainian poet Taras Shevchenko reprinted it in his primer, the playwright Mykhailo Starytsky wrote his drama Marusia Boguslavka based on the story, and the Soviet composer Anatoly Svechnikov wrote a ballet, "Marusya Boguslavka".

== Legend ==
Marusya was kidnapped during the Crimean slave trade and sold into a Turkish harem. The duma tells how she earned the trust of her husband and gained access to the keys of the palace, including the prison. She used them to free a group of Ukrainian Cossacks who had been imprisoned for 30 years. However, she did not flee with them but remained in the harem since this was now the only life she knew.

In comments to the dumas about Marusya, her high status is compared to that of Roxelana.
