= Oleksandr Borodai =

Ukrainian-American engineer, bandurist, and activist

- Олександр Бородай
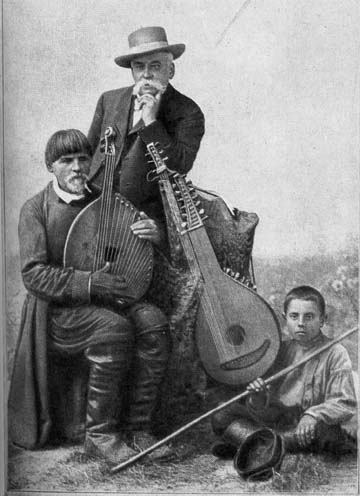
- Kobzar Hnat Honcharenko (left), Oleksander Borodai with a torban, and Honcharenko's guide boy
- Born: 1844; Poltava Governorate, Russian Empire (now Ukraine)
- Died: 1919 (aged 74–75)
- Occupations: Engineer, Bandurist, Political and cultural activist

Oleksandr Ivanovych Borodai (Note: Ukrainian: Олександр Іванович Бородай, romanized: Oleksandr Ivanovych Borodai) (1844–1919) was a Ukrainian-American engineer, bandurist, and political and cultural activist.

Borodai was born Oleksandr Ivanovych Borodayevski (Ukrainian: Олександр Іванович Бородаєвський, romanized: Oleksandr Ivanovych Borodaievskyi) in the Poltava region of the Russian Empire (now Ukraine). After studying in the Cadet Corps he became an officer. Later he graduated from a polytechnical institute and became a military engineer electrician. In the 1870s, he emigrated to the United States and changed his last name to Borodai. In the 1890s, he returned to Ukraine and took part in political and cultural activities.

He took interest in Ukrainian folk music and became a teacher of kobza music in Lysenko Music and Drama School in Kiev. In 1902 and 1903, he was at the forefront of the preservation of kobzar music by means of sound recording, using the recently invented phonograph.

In 1919, he was shot by the Bolsheviks.
