= Pavlo Hashchenko =

Ukrainian bard

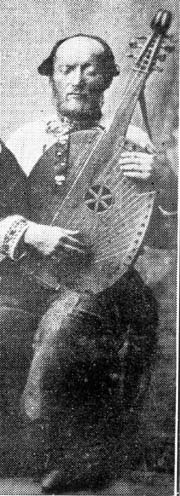
Pavlo Hashchenko.

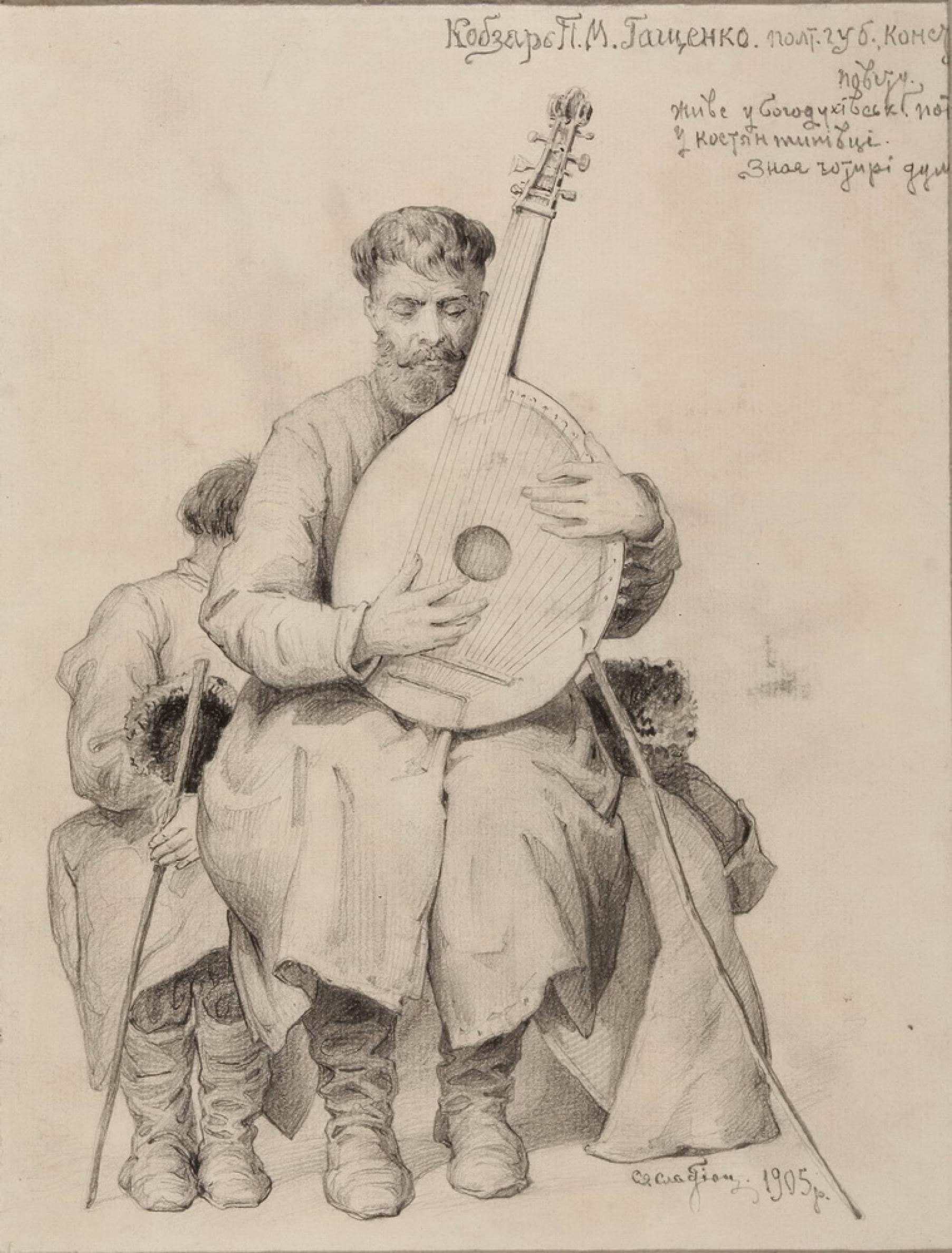
Pavlo Hashchenko as depicted by Opanas Slastion

Pavlo Ivanovych Hashchenko ( -1933) was a Ukrainian kobzar and bandura player.

Hashchenko was originally from Poltava province but lived most of his life in the village of Konstantynivka, Bohodukhiv county, Kharkiv province.

Among the kobzars of the Slobozhan region he was thought of as one of the best, and consequently he was invited to perform at the XIIth Archeological Conference held in Kharkiv in 1902.

At that concert Hashchenko's solo performance included the satirical song "Popadia" and he performed in the ensemble with other kobzars.

In 1905 Opanas Slastion painted a portrait of Hashchenko and noted that Hashchenko knew four dumy (sung epic poems).

After the performance at the XIIth Archeological Conference Hashchenko performed at a numerous other kobzar concerts, but without much fanfare, quietly and unobtrusively. There unfortunately is scant information in written sources about this kobzar.

== Students ==
- Makarij Tymofiyevych Khrystenko (1914)
- I. Kuchuhura-Kucherenko
- S. Hryn'ko
- A. Maliovanyj

== Sources ==
- Mishalow, V. and M. - Ukrains'ki kobzari-bandurysty - Sydney, Australia, 1986
- Khotkevych, Hnat - Materialy pro kobzariv ta lirnykiv - Lviv, Fond #688
- Humeniuk, A. - Ukrainski narodni muzychni instrumentsy - Kyiv 1967, p 79
