= Ivan Kuchuhura-Kucherenko =

Ukrainian kobzar (1878–1937)

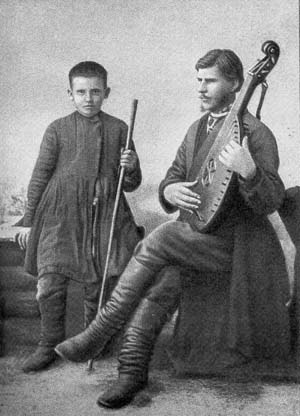
Ivan Kuchuhura-Kucherenko (right).

Ivan Iovych Kuchuhura-Kucherenko (Ukrainian: Іван Іович Кучугура-Кучеренко; Russian: Иван Иович Кучугура-Кучеренко; July 7, 1878 – November 24, 1937) was a Ukrainian minstrel (kobzar) and one of the most influential kobzars of the early 20th century. For his artistry he was awarded the title "People's artist of Ukraine" in 1919 and later "People's Artist of the Ukrainian Soviet Socialist Republic" in 1926.

== Biography ==
=== Childhood ===
Ivan Kucherenko (or as he later became known, Kuchuhura-Kucherenko) was born on July 7, 1878, in the village of Murafa of Bogodukhovsky Uyezd in the Kharkov Governorate of the Russian Empire. At the age of 3, he became fully blind in his left eye and had some damage in his right eye. At the age of 8, he lost his father and became an orphan.

The young Kucherenko had exceptional musical talent which directed him to the lifestyle of a kobzar. He was apprenticed to the kobzar Pavlo Hashchenko and began to perform as a kobzar at the turn of the 20th century.

=== Education and performances ===
In 1902, Kucherenko participated in the 12th Archeological Conference held in Kharkiv where he was the youngest participant — at age 24.

The performance at the conference was organized by Hnat Khotkevych who noticed that the kobzar was exceptionally gifted artistically, and during the preparation of the concert, spent a considerable amount of time with him. This association with Khotkevych left a significant impression on Kucherenko as he was able to learn much from Khotkevych. Khotkevych wrote in his memoirs:

I did not teach him my performances specifically, but he listened to my performance, and as a talented individual, independently copied me.

In 1906, Kucherenko was performing at the market in Yekaterinoslav (now Dnipropetrovsk) and was heard by the renowned historian Dmytro Yavornytsky. Kucherenko's high artism left a deep impression on Yavornytsky. Yavornytsky wrote:

To me he was a costly diamond who would only show his colours after polishing by a master.

He invited Kucherenko to his home and later sent him to Myrhorod to further master his bandura performance under the guidance of Opanas Slastion. For three months Kucherenko lived and studied at Slastion's house, whereupon he returned to Yekaterinoslav and thanked the professor for his fatherly guardianship. Kucherenko demonstrated his newly acquired artistic skills to the professor, who was extremely satisfied, and very moved. Yavornytsky organized a concert for the kobzar in Yekaterinoslav, which was a resounding success and helped elevate the popularity of Kucherenko as an exceptionally talented folk singer.

In 1908, Kucherenko was invited to work as a teacher at the Mykola Lysenko's music school in Kiev. Here he worked for a period of 18 months. The work was difficult, and he was unable to continue it. He resumed his concertizing where he remained a master performer.

Kucherenko was a virtuoso player of the bandura and had an exceptional baritone voice which left an excellent impression on the audience. Khotkevych noted:

While Parkhomenko was alive, Kucherenko took second place to his performances, but after his death, Kucherenko remained the most renown(sic) bandurist.

In 1913, Kucherenko traveled to Saint Petersburg on the invitation of T. Pryvalov, on the recommendation of Hnat Khotkevych where he had over 40 concerts, mainly at educational establishments. After Saint Petersburg, Kucherenko was invited to Moscow by the "Kobzar" Society where he also performed at ethnographic concerts and evenings organized by the society.

In 1915, Kucherenko gave a highly successful concert at the Kharkiv Public Library.

During the brief period of Ukrainian independence, Kucherenko toured Ukraine with concerts supporting the government of Symon Petliura whom he knew personally. For his activity in supporting the government he was awarded the title "People's Artist of Ukraine" by the then Ukrainian government.

=== Soviet period ===
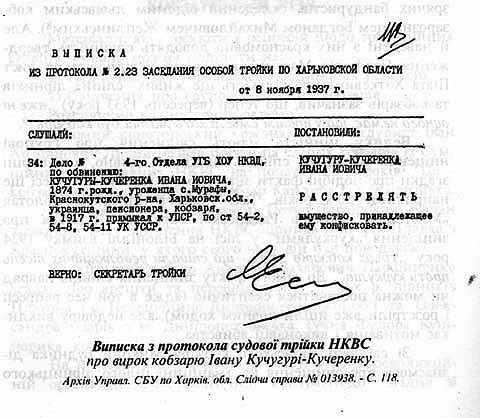
A NKVD document issued sentencing Kucherenko to death by firing squad.

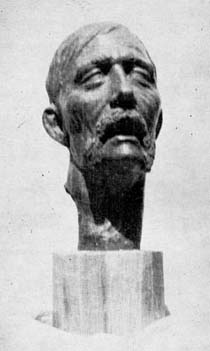
Death mask of I. Kucherenko done by Fedir Yemetz.

During the Soviet period, Kucherenko was able to perform even more often. Initially the government supported many of these performances. In 1921, in the city of Bohodukhiv, a special concert was organized to celebrate his 25th anniversary of being a kobzar and he was one of the first artists to receive the prestigious title of People's Artist of the Ukrainian Soviet Socialist Republic in 1926.

After 1928 Kucherenko began to perform on the grave mound monument of Taras Shevchenko in Kaniv. In the 1930s it is known that he secretly became ordained as an orthodox priest in the Ukrainian Autocephalous Orthodox Church.

Until recently Kucherenko's true date of death was not officially known. Soviet sources such as the Soviet Encyclopedia stated that he died in 1943 in Kharkiv during the German occupation. Recently, it has become known that Kucherenko was arrested and after a period of eight months of prolonged torture was finally shot by the NKVD in 1937. His body was buried in a mass grave on the territory of the KGB recreational facility in the area of Piatykhatky on the outskirts of Kharkiv.

== Repertoire ==
Kucherenko's repertoire included six dumy (sung epic poems):

1. Oleksiy Popovych (probably from Khotkevych)
2. About the Poor Widow and her three sons
3. Captives lament (from Slastion)
4. Khmelnytsky and Barabash (from literary sources)
5. The death of Bohdan Khmelnytsky (from literary sources)
6. The death of the kozak-bandurist. (from Khotkevych)

Many of the texts of these dumy he learned from books, and the accompaniment he composed himself or sometimes borrowing from other bandurists. His repertoire also included numerous songs of literary origin and songs which he composed himself.

All this, as with his level of intelligence, much of which he picked up in his associations with other intellectuals, we see in Kucherenko a new type of kobzar where the folk tradition intertwine with the newest cultural developments, no longer totally pure. When singing dumy, Kucherenko uses a long melodic line as compared to recitation; he is a true concert performer and performs in the larger towns, but for the ethnographer is less interesting.

— Filaret Kolessa

Khotkevych also noted that Kucherenko had lost much of his folk character in his renditions of Ukrainian folk songs.
