= 12th Archeological Congress =

The XIIth Archeological Congress Kharkiv, 1902 was one of a number of Archeological Conferences known as Congresses held in Russian Empire. These Conferences were hosted by a different city of the Russian Empire every three years.

The 1902 the XIIth Archeological Congress was notable for a performance by kobzars from a number of regions of Ukraine, organized by writer and bandurist Hnat Khotkevych, who also wrote an accompanying paper. The success of this concert performance elevated the status of the kobzars, who had been persecuted by the Russian tsarist authorities.

== Kobzar performers ==
For the conference six kobzars were invited; four from the regions around Kharkiv: Petro Drevchenko, Pavlo Hashchenko, Ivan Kuchuhura Kucherenko, Hrytsko Netesa; one from Poltava province; Mykhailo Kravchenko; and one from Chernihiv province: Terentiy Parkhomenko. To this group of six were added three lirnyks.

== Aftermath ==
A review of the concert appeared in the journal "Etnograficheskoe Obozrenie".

Hnat Khotkevych attempted to organize a large concert tour of Ukraine featuring the kobzars, but was blocked by regional governors.
