= Duma (epic) =

Sung epic poem originating in Ukraine

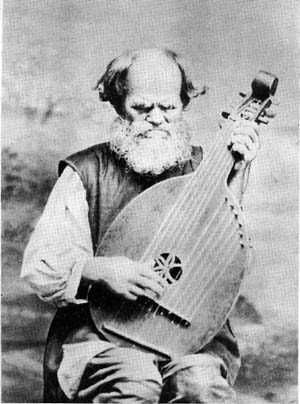
Kobzar Ostap Veresai – One of the finest exponents of Dumy in the 19th century

A Duma (Ukrainian: дума, plural dumy) is an oral epic poem which originated in Ukraine during the Cossack era, possibly based on earlier Kyivan epic forms. Historically, dumy were performed by itinerant Cossack bards called kobzari, who accompanied themselves on a kobza or a bandura and were often blind; or by lirnyks, players of lira (also known as relya), a Ukrainian variety of hurdy-gurdy. Dumas are sung in recitative, in the so-called "duma mode", a variety of the Dorian mode with a raised fourth degree.

Dumy were vocal works built around historical events, many dealing with military action in some forms. Embedded in these historical events were religious and moralistic elements. There are themes of the struggle of the Cossacks against enemies of different faiths or events occurring on religious feast-days. Although the narratives of the dumy mainly revolve around war, the dumy themselves do not promote courage in battle. The dumy rather impart a moral message on how one should conduct oneself properly in the relationships with family, community, and church. However, the kobzari did not play only religious songs and dumy. They also played "satirical songs (sometimes openly scabrous); dance melodies; either with or without words; lyric songs; and historical songs".

== Origin ==
The first historical mention of duma songs comes from Stanisław Sarnicki's Annals under the year 1506. First mention of the term "Duma" in the meaning of epic song comes from a Polish translation of the Bible published in Kraków in 1561. The word duma originates from Polish rather than from Ukrainian (or Ruthenian). The word duma was already used in Old Polish literature (Old Polish literature spanned from the medieval period through the Baroque era). Polish Dumas typically told of the deeds of a historical hero or an otherwise unknown person who had achieved something noteworthy. Its action was usually set in an atmospheric landscape and included reflections on the past. The style of the duma was simple, often drawing on elements of everyday speech. Later, Polish dumy were also written with elements of the supernatural—centered on meditations over knights’ graves, ruins, or nocturnal settings—as well as romantic dumy recounting the amorous adventures of knights. Poles used the word duma for their own ballades as well as foreign ballades (including Ukrainian ones), from very early on, Mikołaj Rej called Ukrainian epics dumy. Some popular Polish dumy include "Duma o Żółkiewskim", "Duma o Chodkiewiczu", and "Duma Kamieniecka."

While the name ”duma” for Ukrainian epic songs is a Polonism (a name borrowed from Polish), the songs themselves do not derive from Polish literary or musical traditions. Ukrainian dumy constitute an indigenous oral-epic form rooted in the historical and social experience of the Cossack Hetmanate and transmitted by itinerant bards known as kobzari and bandurysty. In terms of their origin, dumas are connected with holosinnia (Ukrainian: голосіння), traditional laments for the dead similar to keening. Their poetic features have also been influenced by hagiographic literature of Kyivan Rus', as well as by Cossack Baroque aesthetics. Duma as a genre became widespread around the areas of Central and Central-Eastern Ukraine following the Cossack wars. The first known recording of the text of a duma comes from 1684 Duma of Cossack Holota.

The relationship between the military and the religion with dumy originated in the times of the Cossack rebellion of 1648. Ukraine fell under the control of the Catholic Polish-Lithuanian Commonwealth, that imposed discriminatory measures on the Eastern Orthodox Church. This rebellion was followed by “partition and eventual subjugation of the Ukrainian lands and the Ukrainian church. The Cossacks rebelled against the religious oppression and their lands were eventually lost to the oppressor. This causes a great dilemma in the church because the Cossacks were defenders of the faith, and since they lost, and the faith is infallible, the Cossacks themselves must have done something sinful. This is why a duma has a great religious undertone and is a song that tells of death and defeat, not of victory. Pavlo Zhytetsky suggested that the style of duma's evolved as a unique combination of folk and educated cultures.

== Structure and classification ==
Duma about Morozenko as performed by Ivan Kuchuhura-Kucherenko

Duma songs are characterized by an abundance of original poetic methods, such as employment of free verse, use of parallelisms, paronymical contructions and synonyms, rhyming verbs placed at the end of the sentence etc. Distinct poetic and musical phrases of a duma form into clusters separated by caesura. Independently of their content, all dumas have a common melodical model consisting of two or three musical formulas, whose variation contributes to pathos and emotional expressiveness. As a result, duma songs can be described as a cycle of variations typologically close to some genres of Eastern music.

Characteristic for dumas is the employment of Dorian mode with a raised 4th scale degree and use of chromaticism (see Ukrainian Dorian scale). Performance of a duma typically starts from an exclamation and has a recitative form. The ending part of the duma is usually dedicated to glorification of its heroes, containing ornamental cadences and instrumental sections.

Dumas are chronologically classified into two major groups: older examples are topically related to the fight against Turks and Tatars, meanwhile the newer ones are connected to the events of Khmelnytsky's uprising against Polish rule. An intermediary group is represented by dumas dedicated to social topics and everyday life of Cossacks.

== Legacy ==
Dumas have played an important role in the development of Ukrainian folklore and musical craft. Among famous performers of songs in this genre were kobzars Ostap Veresai, Andrii Shut, Hnat Honcharenko, Mykhailo Kravchenko and Yehor Movhchan, as well as lirnyks Antin Skoba, Ivan Skubii and Avram Hrebin.

In the early 19th century, the Russian poet Kondraty Ryleyev applied the term duma to historical or heroic songs in East Slavic culture, following his translation of Niemcewicz's “Duma o Michale Glińskim” (“Duma about Michał Gliński”). This adaptation popularized the word across the Slavic literary world, where it came to denote epic or patriotic songs associated with national history and heroism. The first modern publication of Ukrainian dumas was made in 1819 by Nikolai Tsertelev.

The term "duma" was introduced into scientific usage by Mykhailo Maksymovych. Among other notable ethnographers, who collected and studied Ukrainian dumas were Platon Lukashevych, Panteleimon Kulish, Izmail Sreznevsky, Mykola Kostomarov, Amvrosy Metlinsky, Mykola Lysenko, Pavlo Zhytetsky, Vasyl Horlenko, Mikhail Nestorovich Speransky, Filaret Kolessa, Klyment Kvitka, Kateryna Hrushevska, Maria Hrinchenko and others. Major collections of dumas were published in 1874-1875 by Volodymyr Antonovych and Mykhailo Drahomanov.

Duma songs produced a major effect on the development of Ukrainian art and literature, influencing the works of authors such as Nikolai Gogol, Panteleimon Kulish, Andrii Malyshko, Maksym Rylsky, Mykhailo Starytsky, Pavlo Tychyna, Taras Shevchenko, Yurii Yanovsky, as well as paintings by Mykhailo Derehus, Lev Zhemchuzhnikov, Ivan Yizhakevych, Opanas Slastion and Mykhailo Khmelko. Elements of duma genre are present in the musical compositions by Artemy Vedel, Mykola Lysenko (particularly in the opera Taras Bulba), Anatolii Sviechnikov, Virko Baley, Lesia Dychko, Borys Liatoshynsky, Levko Revutsky, Myroslav Skoryk, Hnat Khotkevych and others.

== Notable Dumas ==
Duma about Marusia Bohuslavka
A 1909 recording of kobzar Stepan Pasiuha performing the Duma about Marusia Bohuslavka

- Duma of Cossack Holota (Ukrainian: Дума про козака Голоту) - earliest fully recorded Ukrainian duma, whose text was published in 1684
- Duma of Marusia Bohuslavka
- Duma of Samiylo Kishka
- Duma about Morozenko
- Hetman Mazepa's Duma (created c. 1698)

== See also ==
- Preservation of kobzar music
