= Hnat Khotkevych =

Ukrainian writer and bandurist 1877–1938

- Гнат Хоткевич
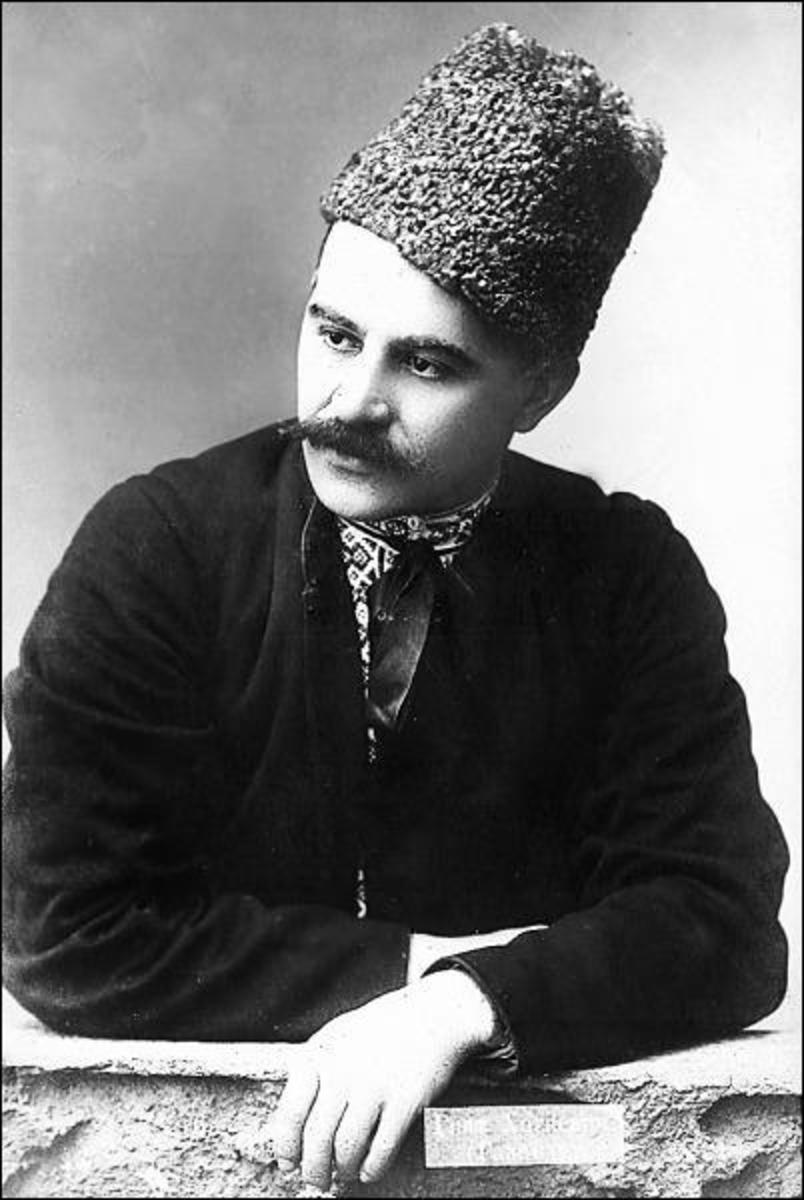
- Khotkevych in the early 1900s
- Born: 31 December 1877; Kharkov, Kharkov Governorate, Russian Empire
- Died: 8 October 1938 (aged 60); Kharkov, Ukrainian SSR, Soviet Union
- Cause of death: Shot by the KGB
- Education: Kharkov Polytechnic Institute
- Occupations: Theater and public figure; engineer; inventor; writer; historian; translator; ethnographer; art critic; playwright; screenwriter; composer; musicologist; violinist; pianist; baritone; bandurist; teacher

Hnat Martynovych Khotkevych (Note: Also Gnat Khotkevich or Hnat Khotkevych) (Ukrainian: Гнат Мартинович Хоткевич; 31 December 1877 – 8 October 1938) was a Ukrainian theater and public figure, engineer, inventor, writer, historian, translator, ethnographer, art critic, playwright, screenwriter, composer, musicologist, violinist, pianist, baritone, bandurist, and teacher. He was shot by the NKVD, like many other members of the Executed Renaissance, during Joseph Stalin's Great Terror in the Soviet Union.

Khotkevych was a Renaissance man and was multi-talented. Although he was trained as a professional engineer, he is known more as a prolific Ukrainian literary figure, and also as a dramatist, composer, and ethnographer, and father of the modern bandura.

== Early life and education ==
Khotkevych was born in Kharkiv in 1877. His mother was a domestic worker, though little is known about his father, who left the family in the mid-1880s. As a youth, he learned to play the piano and violin and later learned to play the bandura through observing the blind folk kobzars of the region. He completed his tertiary studies in engineering at the Kharkiv Polytechnic Institute in 1900 and then worked as a railway engineer.

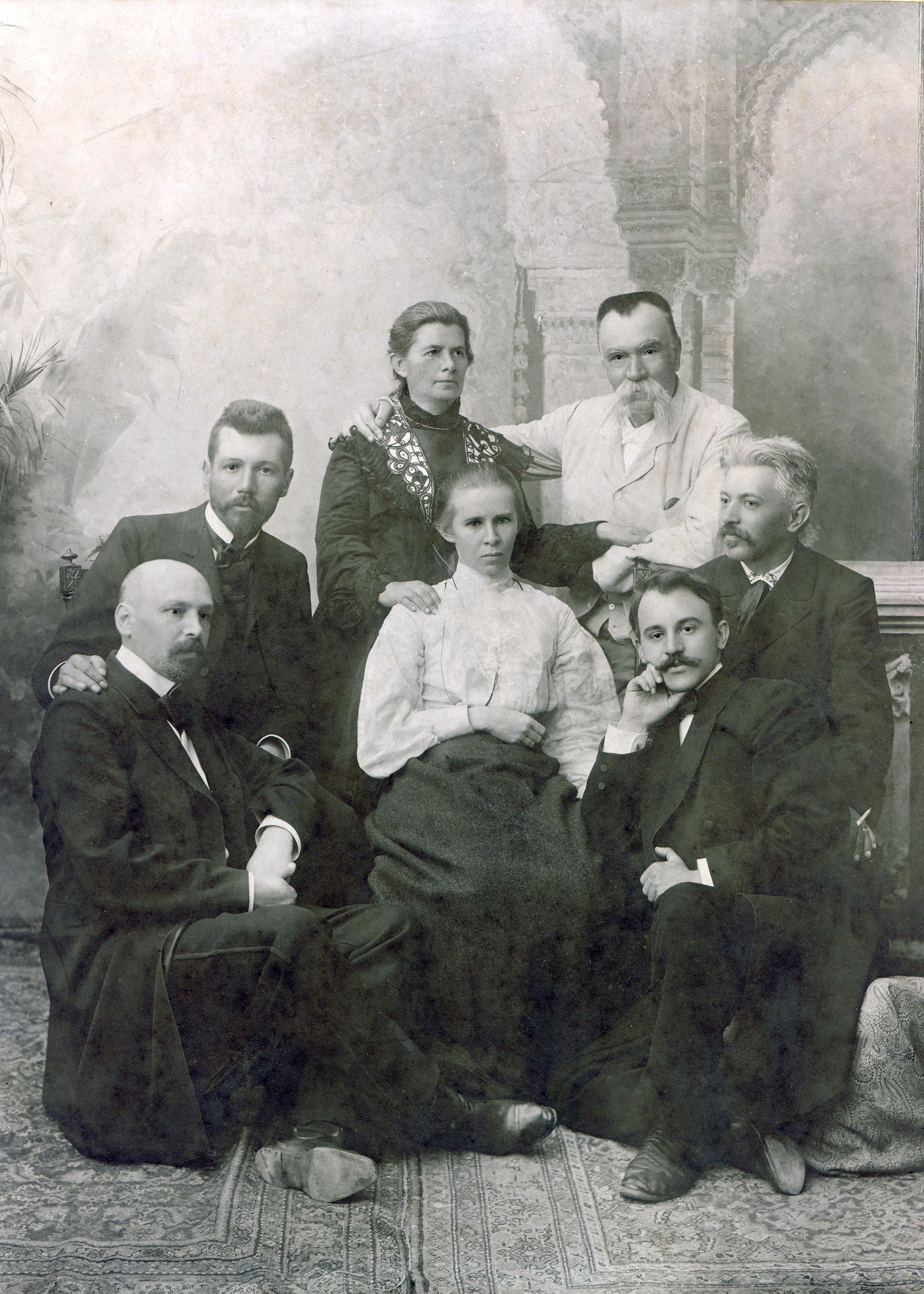
A group of Ukrainian writers gathered in Poltava to inaugurate a monument to Ivan Kotliarevsky, 1903. From left: Mykhailo Kotsiubynsky, Vasyl Stefanyk, Olena Pchilka, Lesya Ukrainka, Mykhailo Starytsky, Hnat Khotkevych, Volodymyr Samijlenko.

== Literature ==
Khotkevych began writing as a student and had his first story published in 1897, "The Georgian Lady". Later, there appeared "The Prodigal Son" (1898), "Analogies of Life" (1901), and "Mountain Aquarelles" (1914). His first major successful work was a novel about life in the Carpathian mountains, The Stone Soul, which was published in 1911. Other novels followed: Aviron (1928), Berestechko, and Tarasyk. An eight-volume collection of his writing was published in 1928; many of his unpublished works have been lost.

Khotkevych incorporated original folkloric and ethnographic material, in particular folk songs, tales, customs, and even dialectical and linguistic differences of the region or time which he was writing about. He included many aspects of the modernist style popular in Ukraine at the time.

=== English Translations ===
English translations of Hnat Khotkevych's works include:

- Short stories: "The Hunger Strike", "In a Free Country p. 260", "The Three", "Facing the Door" and "It Had To Be Thus".

== Theatre ==
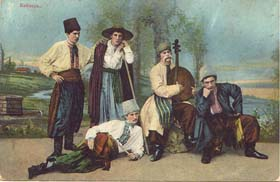
H. Khotkevych playing bandura in a student play in 1899

As a youth, he had the chance of seeing a number of theatrical performances in Kharkiv. He was so taken by these performances that in the summers he organized a theatre in the village of Derkachi for the peasants.

In 1903 he organized a Ukrainian workers' theatre in Kharkiv which was also hugely successful. He produced and wrote over 50 plays. Because his activities addressed social and national issues, he was forced to emigrate in 1905 to Halychyna (part of Western Ukraine), which at that time was under Austro-Hungarian rule.

In 1910, whilst in Halychyna, he once again organized a theatrical troupe made up of illiterate Hutsuls who had great success touring Western Ukraine performing the ethnographic plays he had created.

In 1912, he returned to Kharkiv and, after being released from incarceration, renewed the activities of the Kharkiv Ukrainian Theatre until his internal exile to Russia in 1914.

He continued writing plays; the most interesting was the work Bohdan Khmelnytsky, which chronicles the life and times of the renowned Cossack leader in the mid-17th century.

In 1936, he played a role in the film Nazar Stodolya, which appeared in 1937, but after being shown briefly for two weeks was removed from showings.

Khotkevych wrote a number of studies on the history of theatre in Ukraine such as "The Folk Theatre in Galicia" and "The Theatre in 1848".

== Music ==
As a student, Khotkevych became well known for his bandura playing. He first purchased an instrument in 1894, and first performed on stage as a soloist in 1896. When he was expelled from the Kharkiv Polytechnical Institute, he joined Mykola Lysenko's touring choir as a bandura soloist. At a young age, he was renowned as a virtuoso of the bandura.

In 1902, he was asked to read a paper on the music and traditions of the folk bandurists known as kobzars at the XIIth Archeological Conference held in Kharkiv in 1902. He prepared a paper and also organized a concert which became the first performance of a bandura ensemble in history. During the congress, he was one of the initiators of the idea of the preservation of kobzar music by means of sound recording using the recently invented phonograph.

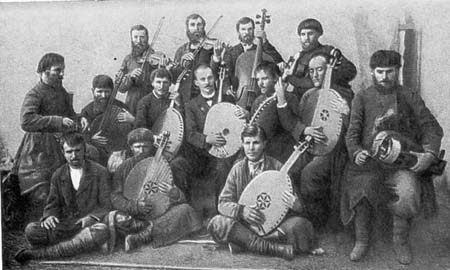
The Kobzar ensemble at the XIIth Archeological Conference in Kharkiv in 1902.

Since that time, this art form became hugely popular throughout Ukraine.

After emigrating to Austria-Hungary in 1906, he traversed Halychyna with solo recitals of bandura music. In 1907, he wrote the first bandura handbook, which was published in 1909 in Lviv.

In 1910, he had one of his bandura compositions – "Odarochka" – published in Kyiv, which became the first composition published for the instrument. He returned to Central Ukraine in 1912 and was soon arrested, jailed, and later exiled to Russia. He returned to Kharkiv only in 1917, where he taught Ukrainian Literature and Language at the Kharkiv Zoological College.

In 1920, he organized a Ukrainian choir that performed ethnographic choral works and, in the 1920s, had numerous compositions published.

From 1926 on, he taught the first conservatory-level courses in bandura at the Kharkiv Music and Drama Institute. A new textbook for the bandura was partially published (the 3 final books were lost at the publishing house). A collection of his compositions for the bandura was prepared but was also lost by the publishing house. Only a handful of students completed these courses, such as Leonid Haydamaka, O. Herashchenko, O. Hayevsky, I. Oleshko, and Hryhory Bazhul. Most were arrested in the early 1930s; however, some found their way out to the West during World War II.

In 1928, Khotkevych became the director of a special bandura studio, organized to retrain and convert the Poltava Bandurist Capella to play in the Kharkiv style. He composed and arranged numerous works for this ensemble. In 1931, the ensemble received the privilege of being the first Soviet ensemble to be invited to tour North America. Unfortunately, the tour did not take place, and Khotkevych was removed from the directorship of the ensemble in 1932. All of his pieces and arrangements were subsequently banned.

Apart from his musical performance and compositions, Khotkevych also produced a number of books on Ukrainian folk instruments, and the bandura specifically. These books were openly criticized in the Soviet press and also banned in 1932.

== Persecution ==
As an ethnographer, he saw the type of persecution that blind kobzars suffered from Tsarist police whenever they visited the city. He was persecuted by Tsarist authorities because of his association with Ukrainian culture and the bandura. He was removed from studies in 1899, and in 1905 was forced to emigrate.

When he returned from Austria-Hungary, he was followed by police and incarcerated, and with the outbreak of World War I was forced into internal exile to Russia.

From 1928, Khotkevych again had difficulties in all his publishing endeavors. Initially, manuscripts began to disappear at publishing houses and in the mail. Works had to be submitted three or four times, and then they were often sabotaged in the publishing houses. Khotkevych wrote numerous letters to complain, but little was done.

From 1931, he suffered numerous personal attacks in the Soviet press, which ultimately resulted in all his music and writing being banned in 1932 and him losing all employment.

In 1933, his family starved during the Holodomor, as he was not given ration cards because he was officially unemployed. In 1934, someone tried to kill him by pushing him under the wheels of a train. As a result, he was hospitalized for a period with moderately severe injuries to his leg.

In February 1938, during the Great Purge, he was arrested and tortured. In 1938, an NKVD tribunal in Kharkiv sentenced him to be shot and his property confiscated. The execution was carried out on 8 October 1938, and his body was buried in a mass grave on the outskirts of Kharkiv.

Soviet sources initially falsely stated that he was sent to Siberia for 10 years without the right to correspond. False death certificates were issued to state that he died in 1943.

== Postmortem ==
Khotkevych was politically rehabilitated by the Soviet government in 1956; however, only a small part of his literary output was republished. In 1977, despite being on a UNESCO list of noted cultural figures to be commemorated, nothing was published.

In post-1991 Ukraine, numerous works by this author have been republished, and many manuscripts have found their way from the archives into publications due mainly to the efforts of the Khotkevych foundation in Kharkiv.

In 1989, a film was made after the Khotkevych book Kaminna Dusha. directed by Stanislav Klymenko. A documentary about Khotkevych's life, "Sledovat' na sever mozhet'" was made in 1991.

== See also ==
- Hnat Khotkevych Ukrainian Bandurist Ensemble
