= Kobzar =

Ukrainian minstrel and historical social institution

Kozak Mamai playing a kobza

A kobzar (Ukrainian: кобзар [kobˈzɑr]; pl. кобзарі, kobzari) was an itinerant Ukrainian bard who sang to his own accompaniment. The professional kobzar tradition was established in Ukraine during the Cossack Era around the 16th century. Kobzari were often blind and became predominantly so by the 1800s. The word kobzar literally means 'player of kobza', a Ukrainian stringed instrument of the lute family. More broadly, the term is given for a performer of the musical material associated with the kobzar tradition.

== History ==
=== Kozak Mamai and early origins ===
Kozak Mamai (Ukrainian: Козак Мамай) is a popular and iconic image that has many variants, but usually features a man sitting cross-legged and playing a kobza. The hairstyle is often a chupryna of Kozak style. Various items often surround Kozak Mamai including a horse, a tree, a rifle, a sword, and a gunpowder horn, and sometimes a bottle and cup. Sometimes other individuals such as a woman or other Cossacks surround Kozak Mamai, who is deep in thought and reflection. While the historical certainty of this image cannot be established, it represents the assumption that the original composers and singers of dumy were military musicians associated with the Cossacks. Kobzari also played the bandura, an instrument which was likely developed from the kobza.

=== Blindness ===
While prior to the 1800s, there is evidence of performers able to see, blindness was a requirement to become a kobzar in the 1800s, as the social role of kobzar was both profession and social welfare for those who were unable to contribute to farm work. Only men could become kobzari.

In the 1800s, infant mortality was around 30%, with 40% of children dying before age two. Of those that survived, an unusually high number were blind due to the effects of poor health and disease.

As Natalie Kononenko writes, being a blind musician was both a qualification for traditional kobzari, and also part of their effectiveness:

"The restrictions placed on traditional minstrelsy, the restrictions that permitted only blind people to become minstrels and kept ordinary folk from performing a certain set of songs, did not inhibit the profession. Rather, they contributed to its artistic power and especially to its spiritual effectiveness."

=== Apprenticeship ===
In rural life, everyone was expected to contribute to survival, with farm labor being the most important. The blind, unable to help with these tasks aside from rope work, developed an alternate source of income as performers. To learn the necessary skills, blind children could be apprenticed to a professional beggar, either a kobzar or lirnyk. The first stage of training consisted of how to physically live and survive in the world being blind. Next, the apprentice would learn songs to be performed, and the etiquette of begging. The normal time for an apprenticeship was three years. Training for girls ended with singing; only males were allowed to learn to play instruments and learn to sing epic songs. Because apprentices could not see, they had to be taught to play instruments by touch.

Learning the skills to be a kobzar took time and effort, and apprentice needs varied. Apprentices' intelligence and aptitude would affect the length of the apprenticeship. Older students might have a shorter apprenticeship because they'd already learned needed skills for survival while blind. Some apprentices with less aptitude might set out on their own without learning difficult songs including dumy. Others might seek an additional apprenticeship for additional skills. Upon completing an apprenticeship, apprentices were given the status of minstrel during a secret and closed initiation rite called a vyzvilka, following which they were allowed to perform as kobzar or lirnyk.

=== Repertoire ===
Songs sang by kobzari can be categorized as zhebranka, psalmy, istorychni pisni, dumy, and satirical songs. Zhebranka were begging songs often highlighting the fleeting nature of life, a description of life with the disability of blindness, an apology for seeking alms, and a cultural or religious reference to cloth (rushnyky). Psalmy were religious songs, not necessarily psalms, on the subject of the Bible or religion. Like zhebranka, psalmy also often repeated the theme of the brevity of life, in addition to the afterlife, and hope and help in the form of the women (Mary and Mary Magdalene) and Saint Nicholas (Mykolai). Istorychni pisni and dumy are historical songs of form similar to psalmy, and related historical events and epic stories of Cossack heroes which were important on a personal or national level. The satirical songs were not performed by all minstrels, and always outside serious performance.

=== Social role and travel ===
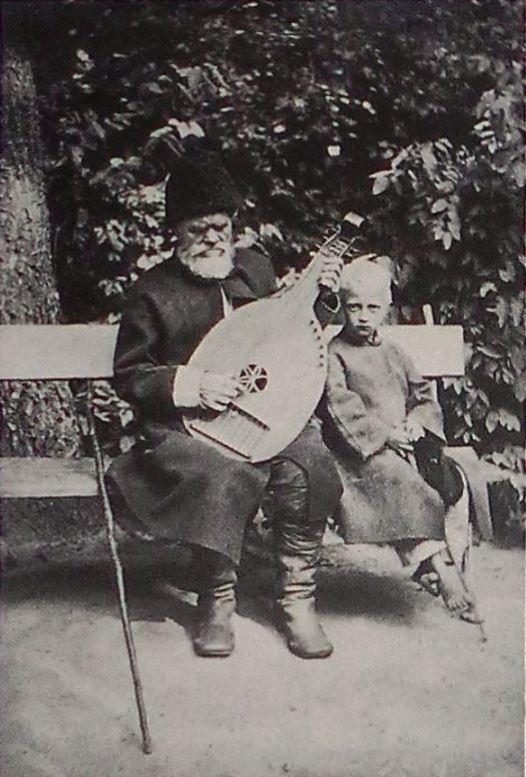
Kobzar Ostap Veresai with his guide boy, 1871

Kobzari were generally itinerant, tending to have a "circuit" of villages that would be visited regularly, going house to house until finding company that had something to share and welcomed the visit. They would not beg in their own village, and when traveling, would stay in the home of a fellow kobzar or lirnyk. They would sometimes perform at fairs, religious festivals, and weddings. Kobzari traveled from town to town, sharing news from village to village.

=== Role of guides ===
Being blind, kobzari would often require assistance in their travel, and would often hire a boy or girl to serve as a guide (povodyr). These children were often orphans or disabled themselves so that they likewise could not contribute to farm labor. The guide would often assist the kobzar until old enough to learn a skill or trade, which was often making musical instruments due to their experience from kobzari. A kobzar's own children might serve as guide while still too young to provide farm labor, though would not usually follow their father into the minstrelry. The children of a kobzar would often try to convince their father to stay home as soon as they were able themselves to earn enough money for them to do so.

=== Contribution of women ===
Many kobzari were married, and a kobzar with a wife and children was considered normal.

While boys, girls, men, and women could all be blind, only boys and men were allowed to learn and play instruments, and to sing epic poetry or other historical songs with relatively higher professional status. Though girls and women could be taught and allowed to sing, guilds believed men were more in need of money than women in order to support dependents, and as a result prohibited girls and women from performances with instruments or of epic poetry or historic songs (which earned performers more money). Women were considered to have better voices, which compensated for being restricted in what they were allowed to learn and perform.

Though poorly documented, there is evidence that women also learned epic poetry, historical song, and also learned to play the instruments, though they had to do so outside of guilds, and could only perform in the privacy of their homes. This privately held knowledge by women contributed to documentation and preservation of the tradition.

== Organization ==
The term Kobzarstvo refers to the art and related culture of singing to the accompaniment of the Ukrainian plucked string instruments. More specifically, it can refer to the culture of Ukraine's pre-Second World War blind professional itinerant folk singers.

=== Schools ===
At the turn of the nineteenth century there were three regional kobzar schools: Chernihiv, Poltava, and Slobozhan, which were differentiated by repertoire and playing style.

=== Guilds ===
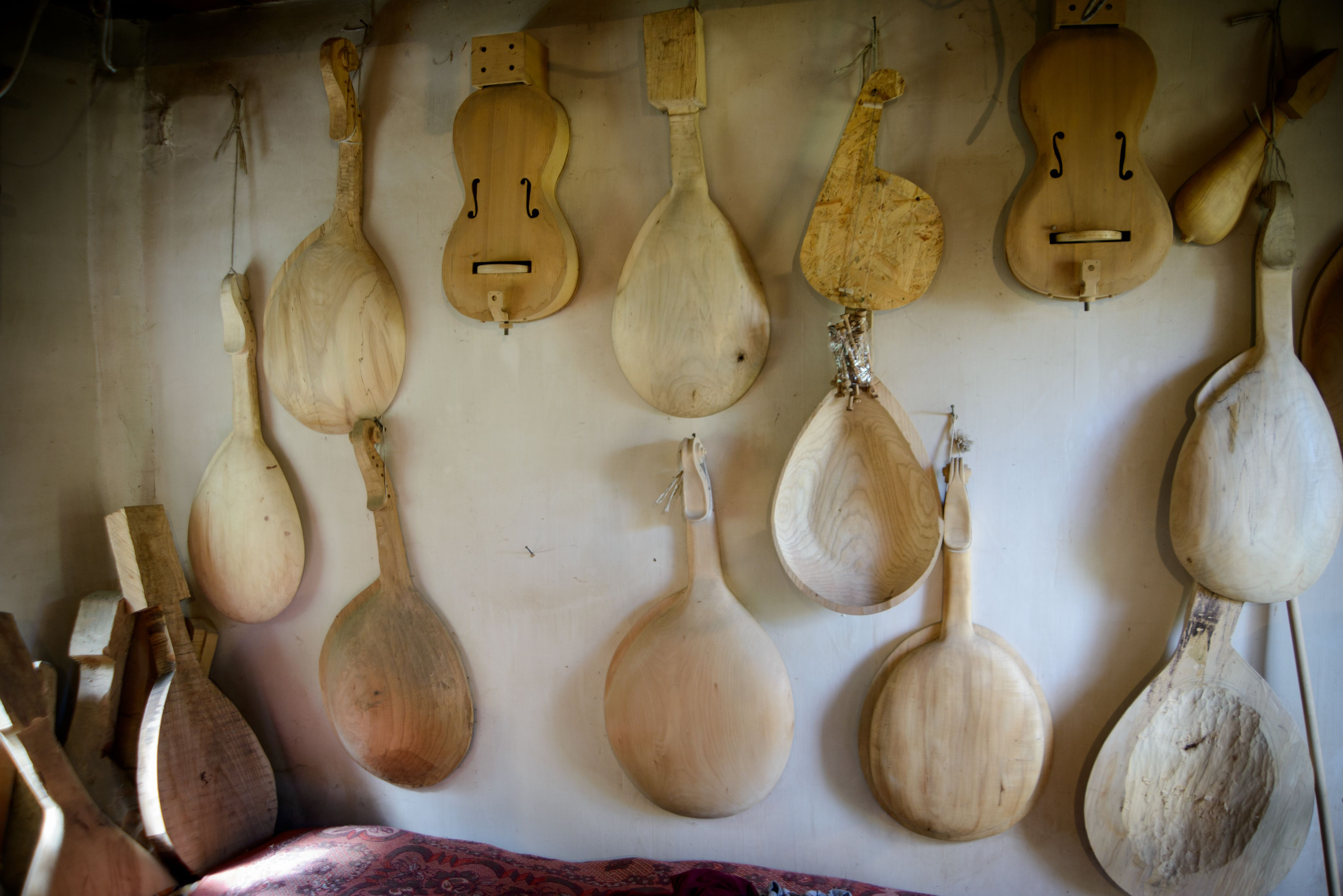
Interior of a modern kobzar guild in Poltava region

In Ukraine, kobzars organized themselves into regional guilds or brotherhoods, known as tsekhs (tsekhy). They developed a system of rigorous apprenticeships (usually three years in length) before undergoing the first set of open examinations in order to become a kobzar. Among the marks of professional competence necessary to gain entry to a guild was mastery of a secret guild language known as the lebiiska mova.

These guilds were thought to have been modelled on the Orthodox Church brotherhoods as each guild was associated with a specific church. These guilds then would take care of one church icon or purchase new religious ornaments for their affiliated church (Kononenko, p. 568–9).

=== Kobzari and lirnyky ===
While some sources suggest that kobzari were not always blind, lirnyky were likely disabled, and in general to be considered a kobzar or lirnyk, the minstrel was blind. Kobzari and lirnyki were considered the same category of minstrel, belonging to the same guilds and sharing songs.

== End of kobzardom ==
The institution of the kobzardom essentially ended in the Ukrainian SSR in the mid 1930s during Stalin's radical transformation of rural society which included the liquidation of the kobzars of Ukraine. In the 1930s during the period of the Holodomor, on the order of Stalin, the Soviet authorities called on all Ukrainian Kobzars to attend a congress in Kharkiv. Those that arrived were taken outside the city and were all put to death. This event was not covered in the Soviet press which complicates precise documentary evidence.

Despite this effort and other efforts to eliminate kobzari through execution, kobzari were found difficult to eliminate. Other tactics used to end kobzardom included required registration of musical instruments, prohibition of begging, restrictions on musical performance, destruction of instruments, and imprisonment without food or water.

== Soviet appropriation ==
Kobzar performance was replaced with stylized performances of folk and classical music utilising the bandura conforming to Marxist-Leninist ideology. Rather than learning songs through oral tradition as had the kobzari, only officially approved written texts could be used to learn songs, which were carefully censored and modified to become approved content such as "Duma about Lenin."

Soviet kobzars were stylised performers on the bandura created to replace the traditional authentic kobzari who had been wiped out in the 1930s. Early Soviet minstrels included Ehor Movchan, Fedir Kushneryk, Yevhen Adamtsevych, and Avram Hrebin. These performers were often blind and although some actually had contact with the authentic kobzari of the previous generation, they were mostly self-taught, without apprenticeships, and worked from officially approved written texts. Their successors were likely not aware that oral transmission was possible.

Some received formal training in conservatories. Bandura performers during this era often performed in ensembles, different from the kobzari solo tradition. Their repertoire was primarily made up of censored versions of traditional kobzar repertoire and focused on stylized works that praised the Soviet system and Soviet heroes, including pressure to compose new dumy about Lenin and Stalin.

== Re-establishment of the tradition ==
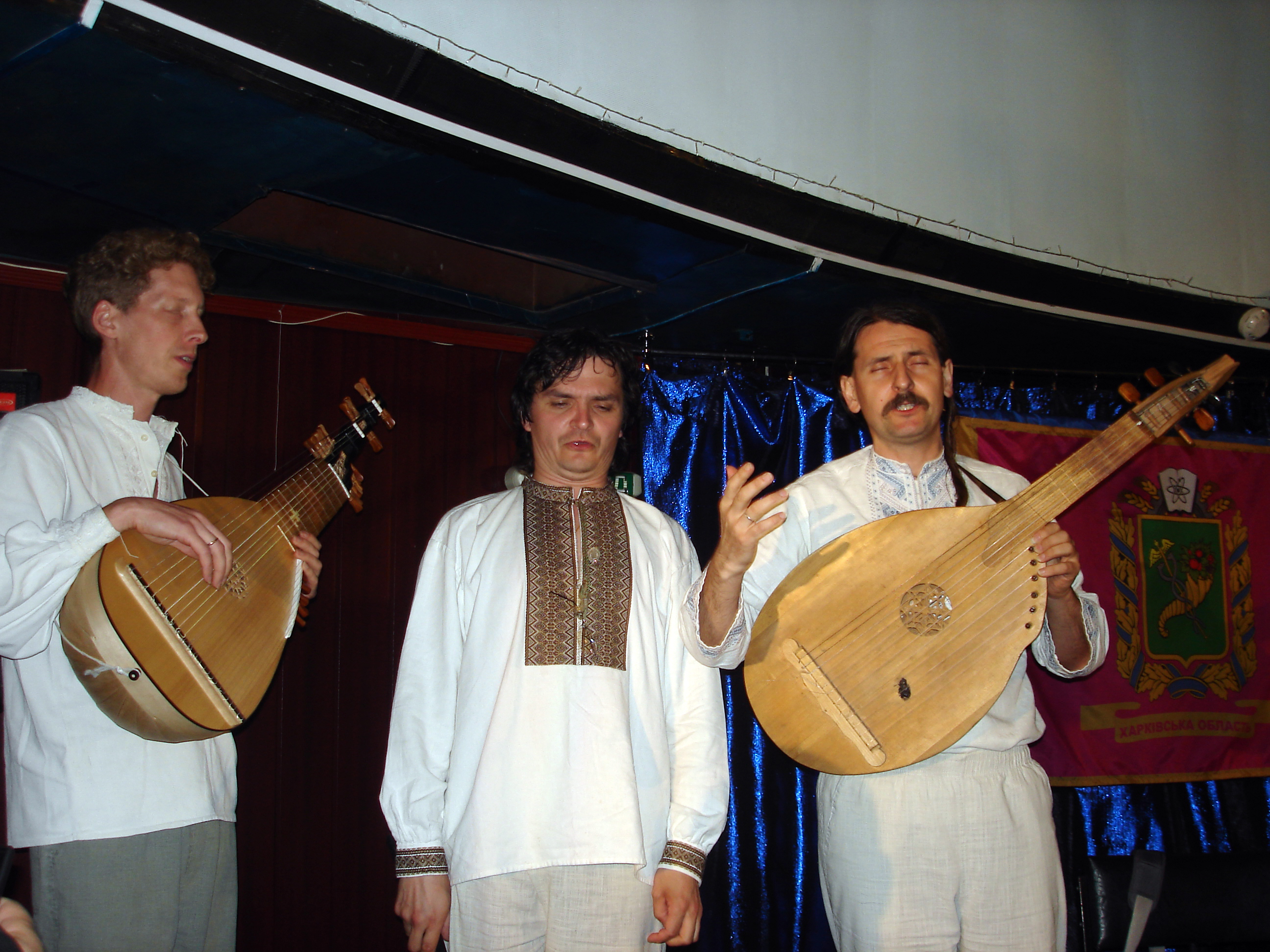
Members of Khorea Kozatska, a modern-day Ukrainian band performing kobzar songs

In recent times, there has been an interest in reviving of authentic kobzar traditions which is marked by re-establishing the Kobzar Guild as a centre for the dissemination of historical authentic performance practice.

While traditional kobzari were blind, those reviving the tradition tend to be young, able to see, and with a focus on Ukrainian independence, seeking to celebrate Ukraine's history and nationhood.

In 2024, the Safeguarding programme of kobza and wheel lyre tradition was inscribed on the UNESCO Register of Good Safeguarding Practices.

== Preservation of kobzar music ==
Safeguarding programme of kobza and wheel lyre tradition
- UNESCO Intangible Cultural Heritage
- Country: Ukraine
- Reference: 02136
- Region: Europe and North America

Inscription history
- Inscription: 2024 (19th session)
- List: Good Safeguarding

The idea of the preservation of kobzar music by means of sound recording originated in 1901–02.

The 12th Archeological Congress was held in Kharkiv, now in Ukraine, then part of the Russian Empire. It was dedicated to Ukrainian folk music. During its preparation, the committee discussed a letter from Russian ethnographer Vsevolod Miller with the suggestion to using recently invented graphophone (Alexander Bell's version of phonograph, which used wax-coated cylinders). However, the suggestion was not accepted due to lack of money. Other people came with the same suggestion, both during the preparation and the sessions of the congress.

A team of Hnat Khotkevych (musicologist, bandurist, engineer, and ethnographer), Oleksandr Borodai (engineer and bandurist), and Opanas Slastion (artist and ethnographer), have eventually taken the job. Borodai bought several phonographs in America for his own money. The first records were taken for dumas of the noted kobzar Mykhailo Kravchenko. However due to the conflict between Borodai and Khotkevych their work stopped in 1904. The work was restarted by the initiative Kvitka family, Kliment Kvitka and poet Lesya Ukrayinka, who put their money into the project. In 1908 they invited Ukrainian ethnographer Filaret Kolessa to do the job.

In later times there were attempts to recast the phonograph records by tape recording the phonograph playback. With the breakthroughs in non-destructive reading of wax cylinders, there were renewed attempts. In 2013, a member of the Wikimedia Ukraine team Yuri Bulka and folklorist Irina Dovgalyuk (who did research on Kolessa's collection) used a Wikimedia grant to digitize 56 cylinders and make the records available under the Creative Commons license.

In 1910 and 1913 Kolessa published two books of music deciphered from the collected phonograms. They were re-issued in 1969 as a book Мелодії українських народних дум (Tunes of the Ukrainian Folk Dumas), now available in "crowd-digitized" form.

== Notable kobzars ==
Notable kobzars prior to the end of the institution in the mid 1930s include Ostap Veresai, Petro Drevchenko, Hnat Honcharenko, Mykhailo Kravchenko, Petro Tkachenko, Stepan Pasiuha, and Ivan Kuchuhura-Kucherenko. Notable modern-era musicians include Yuriy Fedynsky, Taras Kompanichenko, and Eduard Drach.

== Other uses of the term ==
The term kobzar has on occasion been used for hurdy-gurdy players in Belarus (where the hurdy-gurdy is often referred to as a 'kobza'. In Poland, the bagpipe is referred to as a 'kobza' or 'koza'.

== In media ==
In 2014, director Oles Sanin released The Guide (Povodyr) about the guide of a kobzar during the 1930s period of Stalin's holodomor in Soviet Ukraine. The film was nominated for a best foreign-language Oscar. It features a boy whose father is executed by Stalin's secret police and who is then saved by a blind kobzar.

== See also ==
- Bard
- Ashik
- Minstrels
- Troubadour
- Lirnyk

== Sources ==
- Dicaire, David (2010). The Early Years of Folk Music: Fifty Founders of the Tradition. Jefferson, North Carolina: McFarland. ISBN 978-0-7864-4431-1.
- Kononenko, Natalie O. (1998). Ukrainian Minstrels: And the Blind Shall Sing. Folklores and folk cultures of Eastern Europe. Armonk, New York; London: M.E. Sharpe. ISBN 978-0-7656-0144-5.
- Kononenko, Natalie O. (2019). Ukrainian Epic and Historical Song: Folklore in Context. Toronto; Buffalo; London: University of Toronto Press. ISBN 978-1-4875-0263-8.
