= Kharkiv-style bandura =

Kharkiv-style banduras are banduras that allow for the playing of the Kharkiv style, i.e. using the left hand to play melodic figures primarily over the side of the instrument as opposed to the Kyiv style where the left hand primarily plays the basses. To allow for the added required dexterity of the left hand, the instrument is held parallel to the body of the player.

These instruments are in comparison quite rare because they are all individually crafted primarily made by craftsmen outside of Ukraine. In recent times, they have become quite sought after in Ukraine. They are strung either diatonically (with 31–36 strings) (8 basses and 23 prystrunky) or chromatically (with 61–65 strings).

== Early instruments ==
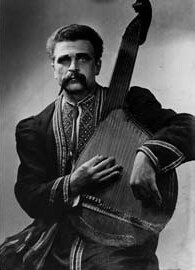
Kharkiv style bandurist on an instrument made by Kruhovy-Hryhory Bazhul

The first standard Kharkiv bandura was designed and manufactured in 1926. This instrument was based on the Starosvitska bandura used by Hnat Khotkevych and was modified somewhat by Leonid Haydamaka. It was intended for use by the bandura students of Hnat Khotkevych at the Kharkiv Mus-dram Institute.

The first instrument was made by Kharkiv instrument maker Snehiriov. This instrument had a diatonic tuning with 31 strings. The back was hewn out of maple.

In the 1930s a workshop for the serial manufacture of diatonically tuned Kharkiv banduras was established by Leonid Haydamka in Kharkiv and later another by Paliyivetz in Poltava. As a result, most players from Kharkiv and Poltava played on Kharkiv-style instruments. Modifications in the construction were gradually introduced such as glued backs, a mechanism for the rapid retuning of the instrument and a dampening mechanism.

Instruments were used by the Kharkiv and Poltava Bandurist Capella and also the Kharkiv Bandurist Quartet and Kharkiv Orchestra of Ukrainian folk instruments.

After the war, unfortunately, many of the diatonic banduras were remade into chromatic Kyiv-style banduras and were destroyed in the process.

== Post war development ==
=== In the diaspora ===
Kharkiv bandura manufacture was continued by the Honcharenko brothers who took the standard Kharkiv bandura as the basis for their design. They improved on the acoustics and construction of the instruments adding a chromatic row of strings, placing the tuning pegs on the lower shemstok and improving the retuning mechanism. This instrument became the standard instrument of the Ukrainian Bandurist Chorus. Honcharenko's designs were later taken and improved by the next generation of makers such as William Vetzal and Ken Bloom.

=== In Ukraine ===
In Ukraine attempts were made to bring the Kharkiv bandura's construction into line with the developments in the Kyiv concert bandura. These attempts were initially made by Perekop Ivanov and Ivan Skliar and resulted in the development of the Kyiv-Kharkiv bandura which did not have a residing success. In recent times, music professor Vasyl Herasymenko in Lviv made attempts to revive the instrument. Attempts were also made to have instruments serially manufactured in the Melnytso-Podilsk Musical instrument workshop.

=== The future ===
As scholarship reveals more of what Hnat Khotkevych's original ideas were, and as interest grows more players will turn to the Kharkiv bandura. Currently, Canadian bandura maker William Vetzal has established serial manufacturing of Kharkiv banduras with backs made of fiberglass which were ordered by the Canadian Bandurist Capella. Two of these newly designed instruments have recently been sold to bandurists in Ukraine.
