= Bandurist =

Player of bandura musical instrument

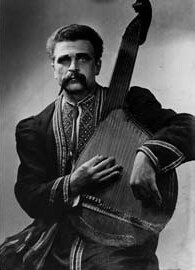
Kharkiv bandurist H. Bazhul

A bandurist (Ukrainian: бандурист, romanized: banduryst) is a person who plays the Ukrainian plucked string instrument known as the bandura.

== Types of performers ==
There are a number of different types of bandurist who differ in their particular choice of instrument, the specific repertoire they play and manner in which they approach their vocation.

- Kobzari, who play authentic ethnographic instruments or copies. This group can also be further categorized into authentic, reproduction, and stage performers.
- Academic players, playing more sophisticated contemporary concert banduras. These performers have a tertiary education majoring in bandura performance and typically perform works by Western classical composers in addition to, or instead of, Ukrainian folk music. This category can be further divided into instrumentalists (who only perform instrumental works) and vocalists (who primarily use the bandura to accompany their voice). The most common academic bandurists play in the Kyiv academic style. There are also a number of Kharkiv style academic bandurists.
- So-called "Fakeloric" performers, who play stylized songs and repertoire on contemporary instruments. Often these performers refer to themselves as contemporary kobzars. Many contemporary blind bandurists can be placed into this category.
- Ensemble performers - performers who sing in a choir and accompany their choral performance with their own playing on the bandura.

=== Ensembles ===
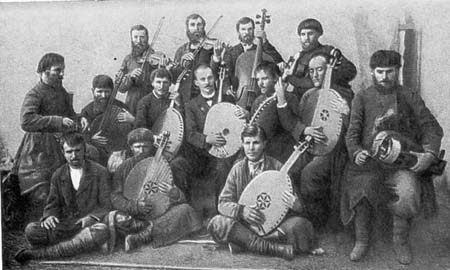
Performance at the XIIth Archeological conference in 1902.

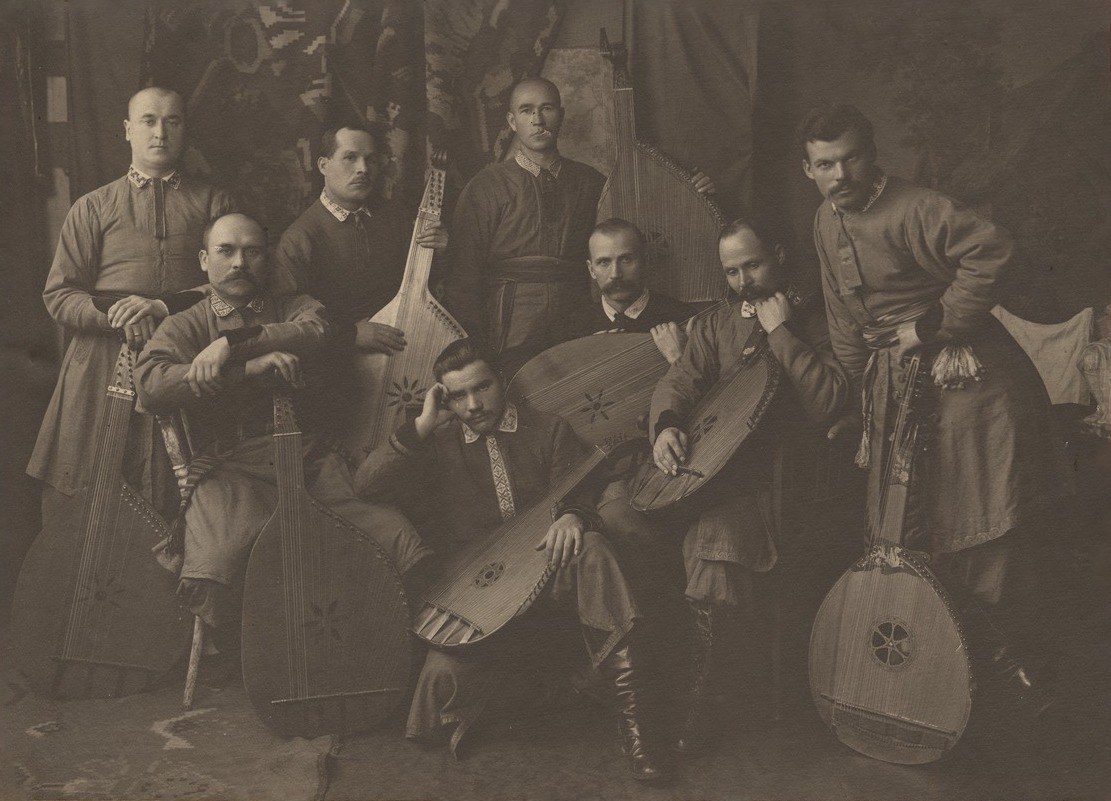
The Kyiv Bandurist Capella in 1924.

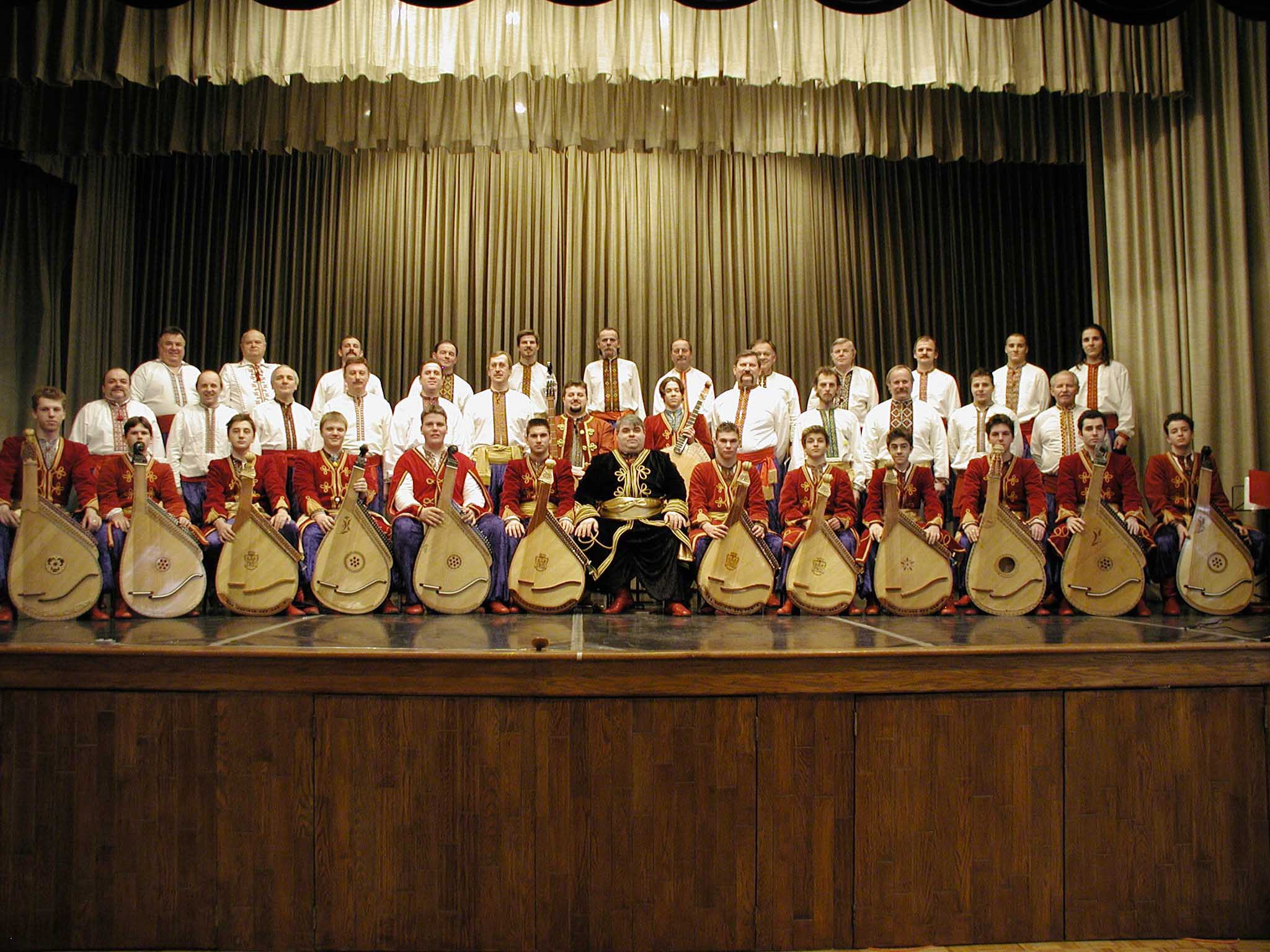
The Canadian Bandurist Capella.

Evidence of ensemble playing prior to the 20th century is scarce, although there do exist accounts of two or sometimes three kobzars playing together at bazaars, especially in the area around Kharkiv.

The first documented performance by a bandura ensemble however took place in Kharkiv in 1902, at the XIIth Archeological conference. The performance had a very positive effect on the popularity of the bandura and ensemble bandura playing. Attempts were made by Hnat Khotkevych to repeat the performance and take the ensemble on tour throughout Ukraine, but permission was not obtained from the Russian authorities.

In 1905 there is evidence of the first performance of a bandura quartet of non-blind bandurists performing in Moscow. From 1906 small bandura ensembles began to form not just from kobzars who had participated in the Kharkiv performance of 1902 but also from non-blind bandurists and had become interested in the instrument. Groups were established by M. Domontovych in Kiev and V. Shevchenko in Moscow and the Kuban.

What is considered to be the first professional (in the sense that this was their main livelihood) bandurist ensemble was established by Vasyl Yemetz in 1918 and became known as the Kiev Bandurist Capella. Despite periods in which the ensemble did not function due to the political turmoil within the country, the ensemble re-established and re-defined itself on numerous occasions and through its concerts stimulated the establishment of many other similar bandura groups. By 1928 there were over 900 bandura ensembles in Ukraine.

Active persecution of bandurists in the 1930s resulted in many players being murdered or persecuted in the 1930s. Many of those that continued playing took the opportunity of seeking freedom emigrating to the West. The Ukrainian Bandurist Chorus which was originally established in 1941 during the Nazi occupation emigrated as a group. It settled in Detroit in the USA where it continued to actively propagated the art form in the West.

The Kiev State Bandurist Capella was re-established in Kiev in 1948 under the direction of Oleksander Minkivsky. Many members after being mobilized to the front in 1941 had died. Others had emigrated. It currently has over 70 members. Numerous other bandurist Capellas exist in Ukraine throughout the country having all male membership, mixed membership, or just female membership. A capella made up of blind bandurists also exists in Lviv.

Bandurist choruses, ensembles and capellas were also established in Argentina, Australia, Canada, France, Germany, Paraguay, Poland, The United States, and Venezuela.

=== Renown exponents ===
Polish court bandurists	Albert Dovhohrai
Russian court bandurists	Alexey Razumovsky
Prominent kobzari	Honcharenko Hnat, Ivan Kuchuhura Kucherenko, Pavlo Hashchenko, Petro Drevchenko, Ostap Veresai
Prominent reconstructive kobzari	Opanas Slastion, Volodymyr Kushpet, Tkachenko Heorhy
Prominent blind bandurists	Yevhen Adamtsevych
Prominent early 20th century bandurists in Ukraine	Fedir Zharko, Hnat Khotkevych, Mykhailo Domontovych, Omelchenko Andriy, Serhiy Bashtan, Volodymyr Kabachok, Adamovych-Hlibiv
Prominent 20th century bandurists outside of Ukraine	Hryhory Bazhul, Yevhen Ciura, Leonid Haydamaka, Petro Honcharenko, Hryhory Kytasty, Petro Kytasty, Volodymyr Luciv, Hryhory Nazarenko, Zinoviy Shtokalko, Mykhailo Teliha, Vasyl Yemetz, Volodymyr Yurkevych
Prominent contemporary active bandurists in Ukraine	Oksana Herasymenko, Roman Hrynkiv, Taras Lazurkevych, Kost Novytsky, Stepan Scherbak, Oleh Sozansky, Volodymyr Voit, Ostap Stakhiv
Prominent contemporary active bandurists outside of Ukraine	Peter Deriashnyj, Mykola Deychakiwsky, Marko Farion, Ola Herasymenko-Oliynyk, Andrij Kytasty, Julian Kytasty, Victor Mishalow

== Persecution ==
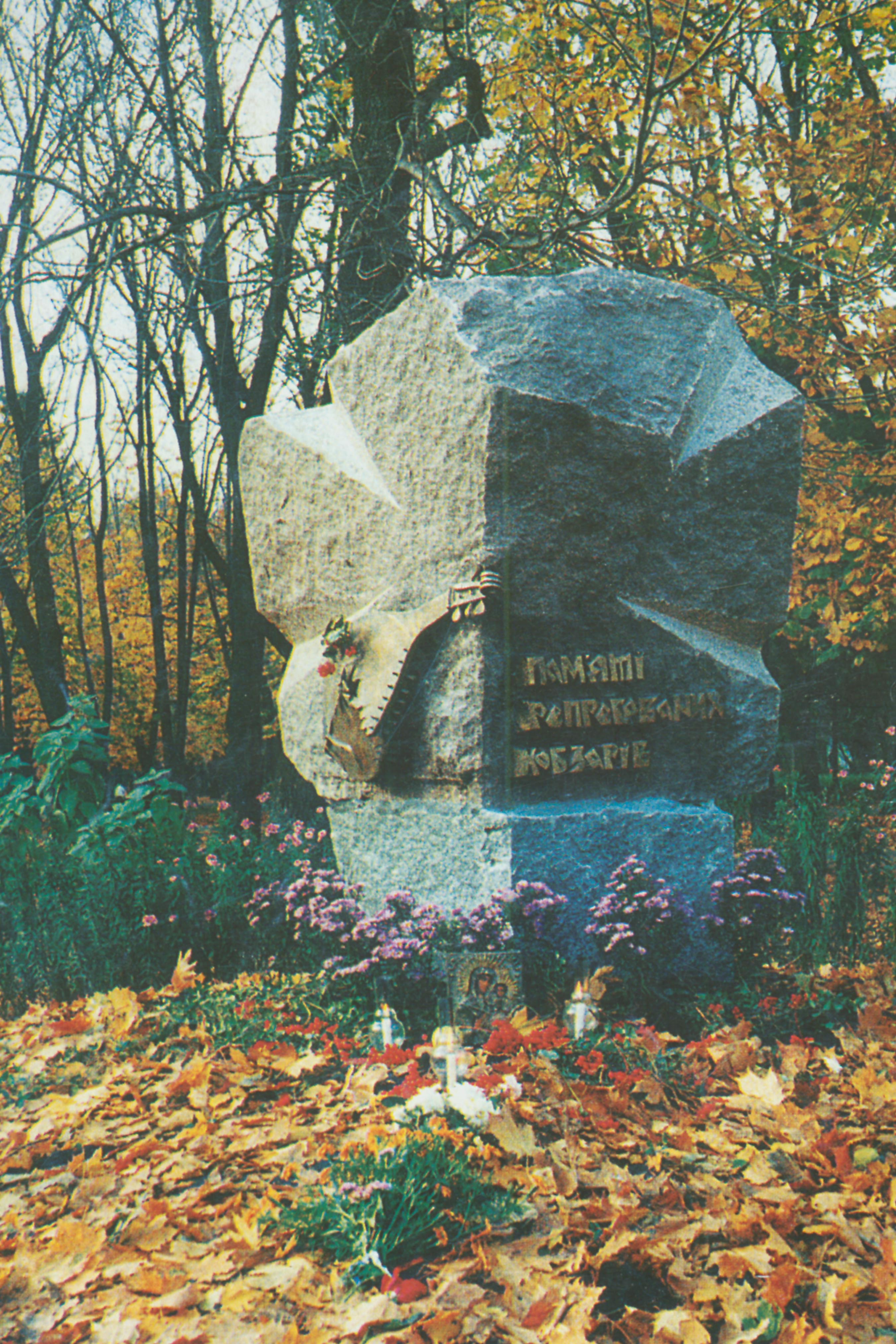
Monument to murdered kobzars in Kharkiv

Many bandurists and kobzars were persecuted by authorities that controlled Ukraine at various times because of the association of the bandura with growing Ukrainian national self-awareness.
