= Honcharenko brothers =

Ukrainian bandura makers

The Honcharenko Brothers—Alexander (1913–2005) and Peter (11 December 1910 – 19 September 2000)—became the dominant bandura-makers (bandura luthiers) and designers in the Ukrainian diaspora.

== Formative years ==
Peter was born in the village of Olshanytsia near Kyiv, in the Russian Empire. His interest and aptitude towards music were demonstrated at an early age. When he first saw and heard the bandura at the age of 12, he set forth to build his own. With diligence and persistence, Honcharenko mastered playing his wonderful instrument without formal training. Unknowingly, he had dedicated himself to a lifetime of perpetuation of the bandura art.

== Bandura design ==
They first set up a workshop in Germany at the end of World War II. They were not just bandura makers, but innovative constructors who developed new types of instruments. In the workshop of the Ukrainian Bandurist Chorus and the Leontovych Bandurist Capella they designed and developed a new type of instrument which combined the best aspects of both the Kyiv and Kharkiv style banduras. In the workshops they made over 50 instruments.

Initially they spent their time repairing instruments, and then began making new instruments for chorus members whose instruments were no longer salvageable. After making a few Kyiv style instruments and a copy of a Hryhory Paliyivetz instrument for Josyp Panasenko a conflicting question arose - "What type of instrument was the best to make?" The Kyiv style players insisted on Kyiv style instruments which had a longer and louder sound because of their longer strings and larger body and had chromatic strings. The players who had been members of the Poltava Capella insisted on Kharkiv-style banduras - diatonic instruments with a mechanism which allowed the players to play in different keys easily. The Kharkiv instruments had a shorter sound and both hands could play over the full range of the instrument. The retuning mechanisms however buzzed and were not reliable.

With this information the Honcharenko brothers designed an instrument which suited both playing styles. It allowed the players to play Kharkiv-style and have access to chromatic strings. They also designed a number of different mechanisms which were more reliable and did not buzz. These new instruments became very popular and were more sophisticated than the previous instruments. In time the whole Chorus received a full complement of new instruments.

The brothers established a workshop in Ingolstadt which served the Shevchenko Bandurist Chorus. They made a large number of instruments and this meant that much experimentation in internal strut design was possible. At that time the brothers would get a carton of cigarettes for a bandura.

This Kyiv-Kharkiv style bandura is often referred to as the "Poltavka" in recognition of the input from the members of the Poltava Bandurist Capella.

In time the brothers both left the Shevchenko Bandurist Chorus (they were upset because they had not been paid for instruments which they had made for the Chorus) and together with Hryhory Nazarenko established a second Bandurist Capella named in memory of the Ukrainian composer Mykola Leontovych in the British occupational zone. They established another workshop in Goslar once again making banduras and in addition, trained craftmen in the art of making high quality concert banduras. In Goslar, the Honcharenko brothers also developed bass and contrabass orchestral banduras.

After the war they rejoined the Shevchenko Bandurist Chorus and moved to Detroit where they continued to train bandura craftsmen such as Vasyl Hirych, Pavlo Stepovy and William Vetzal.

The instruments and mechanism designed by the Honcharenko brothers were used by bandurists in the Ukrainian Bandurist Chorus and became a standard design made by most bandura makers in the West.

In 1980, Olexander retired from his tool and die business and returned to bandura construction. He designed an updated version of their instrument with a more elaborate mechanism and soundbracing system. This design was the design used by Bill Vetzal.

== Administration ==
Mykola Kaharlytsky, writing in (1995) cites Petro Honcharenko as saying that the UBC had become his beloved wife. As president and administrator he had endless responsibilities, ranging from soliciting sponsors and operating funds, to planning concerts and tours; from acquiring costumes and instruments to producing records and audio cassettes. Petro Honcharenko was quoted as saying: "I think I succeeded, for our concert performances were successful with rave reviews from the press. I invested my health and energy in the best interest of the UBC's tradition of instrumental and choral excellence."

Mr. Honcharenko dedicated over 40 years to the Ukrainian Bandurist Chorus. From 1949 to 1989 he oversaw 34 concert tours on three continents and arranged 550 concerts. But Mr. Honcharenko's dedication and vision did not concern itself only with the present, but also the future. To assure that the UBC had future generations of instrumentalists and vocalists, he supported and encouraged the organization of bandura camps. He provided instruction, and shared his engineering skills in bandura construction with academics and future bandura builders, among them Yukhym Pryjmak, Pavlo Stepovy, Vasyl Hirych and Bill Vetzаl, who still continues the tradition of crafting the chromatic Kharkiv style bandura.

In 1992 Ukraine's Ministry of Culture recognized Petro Honcharenko for furthering the refinement of the bandura instrument, and the propagation of "the art of the kobzari" by naming him Merited Artist of Ukraine. With this decree, the government of Ukraine underscored Petro Honcharenko's lifetime achievements as important and significant in the annals of bandura development and artistry.

== Bandura types ==
- Early Kyiv bandura
- Diatonic Kharkiv bandura
- Semi-chromatic Kharkiv bandura
- Peter Honcharenko's bandura
- Alex Honcharenko's concert bandura
- Orchestral Bass bandura
- Honcharenko mechanism
