= Volodymyr Yurkevych =

- Володимир Юркевич
- Born: December 2, 1912; Lviv, Russian Empire (now Ukraine)
- Died: July 7, 1985 (aged 72)
- Occupation: Bandurist

Volodymyr Ivanovych Yurkevych (Note: Ukrainian: Володимир Іванович Юркевич, romanized: Volodymyr Ivanovych Yurkevych) (December 2, 1912 in Lviv – July 7, 1985) was a Ukrainian-American bandurist.

He met up with Yuri Singalevych and began to take lessons from him. Together with Zinoviy Shtokalko they organized a bandura trio. Later they were joined by Stepan Hanushevsky and Semen Lastovych. His original bandura was made for him by S. Lastovych based on an instrument made by Kost Misevych.

During the war he enlisted into the 1st Ukrainian Division and fought at Brody. Later he joined the Ukrainian Insurgent Army. In Germany he performed in a trio with Volodymyr Maliutsa and Zinoviy Shtokalko. Later he joined an ensemble with D. Kravchenko and Hryhory Bazhul.

In 1950 he emigrated the United States. He performed in an ensemble directed by S. Hanushevsky which recorded an album of UPA songs in 1952. In 1972 he organized a Bandurist Capella made up of members of the First Ukrainian Division who lived in NY. He also performed in a quartet with Roman Levytsky. He moved to New York City, where he became director of the New York School of Bandura. He played on a bandura made by Vasyl' Hlad from Gloucester.

He died July 7, 1985.

== Students ==
Andrij Horniatkevych, A. Stusyk, V. Kovar, M. Stocko

== Sources ==
- U pamiati bandurysta Volodymyra Yurkevycha - Bandura 53-54, 1995.
