= Mykola Bohuslavsky =

Kuban Ukrainian activist (1850–1933)

Mykola Bohuslavsky Микола Богуславський
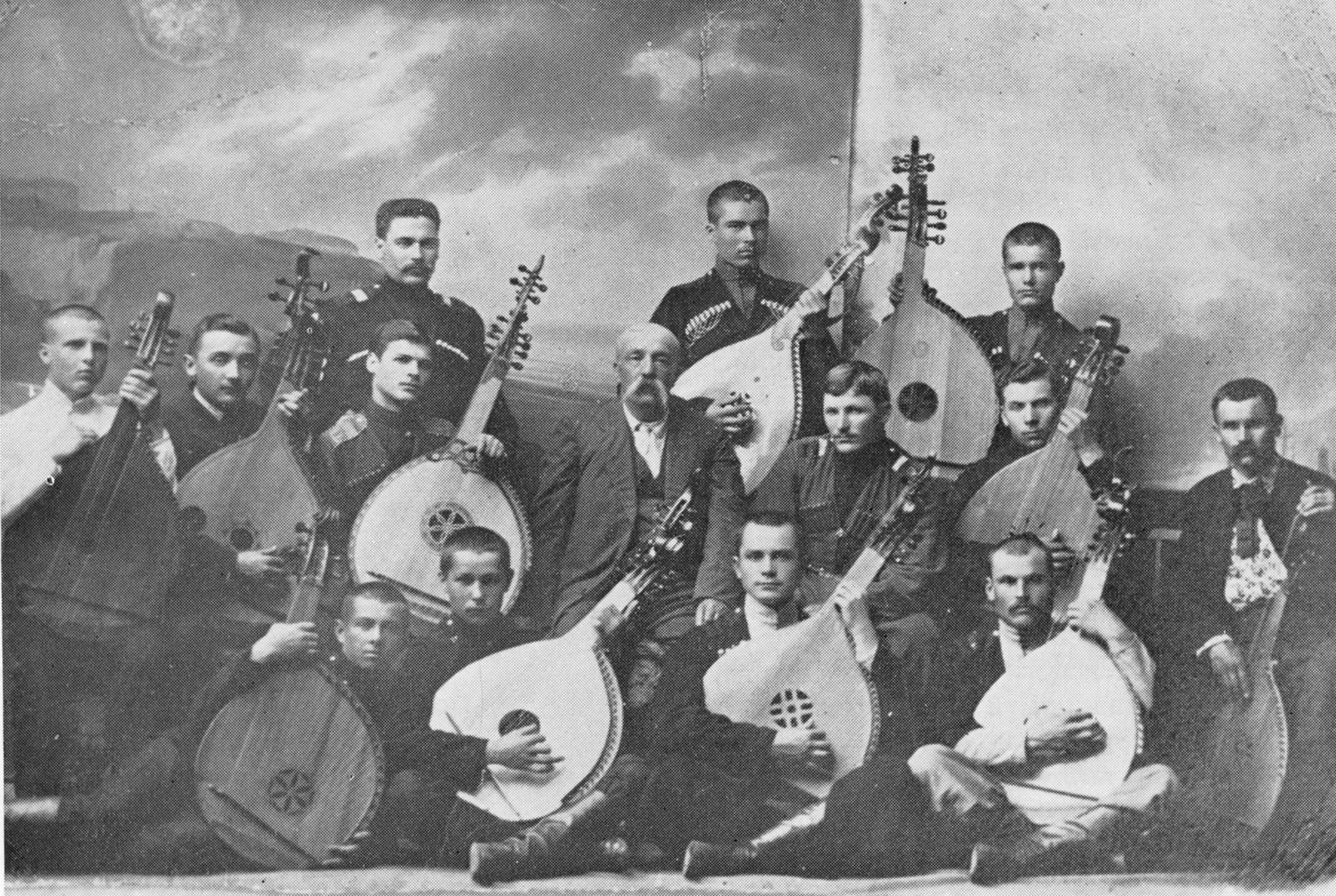
- Bohuslavsky (center) at the second summer bandura school in Yekaterinodar

Background information
- Born: 1850
- Died: 1933 (aged 82–83) Krasnodar, Russian SFSR, Soviet Union
- Genres: Folk
- Occupation: Kobzar
- Instrument: Bandura

Mykola Oleksiiovych Bohuslavsky (Note: Ukrainian: Микола Олексійович Богуславський, romanized: Mykola Oleksiiovych Bohuslavskyi) (1850 – 1933) was an organiser and sponsor of the kobzar renaissance in the Kuban, a community leader, publisher. Bohuslavsky organized the first (1913) and second (1916) schools of kobzar art in the Kuban. Under his support bandura playing in the Kuban became a popular movement.

He was an active member of the Prosvita organization in Yekaterinodar, and the owner of the Ukrainian-language illustrated weekly "Dniprovi khvyli" (1910–14), which was edited by Dmytro Doroshenko. D. Doroshenko regarded Bohuslavsky as "a tireless agitator of the youth who was able to get young people involved in working on community causes."

Bohuslavsky worked as an official in the Kuban-Black Sea Railway. The cossacks called him the "bandura father" because of his deep love for the instrument. As a result of his efforts bandura groups were established in most Stanitsas in the Kuban. He was arrested in 1930–33 and died in the Krasnodar prison in 1933.

== See also ==
- Adamovych-Hlibiv, one of Bohuslavsky’s students

== Sources ==
- Poliovyj Renat Kubanska Ukraina . Kyiv, Diokor, 2003;
