= Adamovych-Hlibiv =

Adamovych-Hlibiv Адамович-Глібів
- Born: Late 1870s Yekaterinodar, Russian Empire
- Died: First half of the 20th century Krasnodar, Russian SFSR, Soviet Union
- Genres: Folk
- Occupation: Bandurist
- Instrument: Bandura

Adamovych-Hlibiv (Note: Ukrainian: Адамович-Глібів, romanized: Adamovych-Hlibiv) (late 1870s – first half of the 20th century) was a Ukrainian bandurist.

== Biography ==
Adamovych-Hlibiv was born during the late 1870s in Yekaterinodar (present-day Krasnodar), where he joined the First Kuban Kobzar School of Mykola Bohuslavsky.

== See also ==
- kobzar

== Sources ==
- Nyrko, O. (2006). Кобзарство Криму і Кубані [Kobzarism of Crimea and Kuban] (in Ukrainian). Lviv, Ukraine: Spolom. p. 270. OCLC 77546314.
- В. Ємець: У золоте 50-річчя на службі Україні [V. Yemetz: In his Golden 50th Anniversary of Musical Work in the Service of Ukraine] (in Ukrainian). Hollywood, California. 1961. p. 354. OCLC 317398858.
