= Zinoviy Shtokalko =

Ukrainian musician (1920–1968)

- Зіновій Штокалко
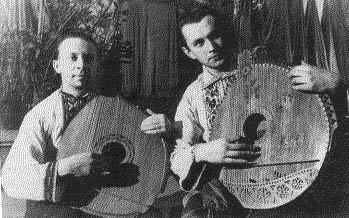
- Yuri Singalevych and Zinoviy Shtokalko. Lviv, 1939
- Born: May 25, 1920; Berezhany, Second Polish Republic, (now Ukraine)
- Died: June 28, 1968 (aged 48)
- Occupation: Bandurist

Zinoviy Pavlovych Shtokalko (Note: Ukrainian: Зіновій Павлович Штокалко, romanized: Zinovii Pavlovych Shtokalko) (25 May 1920 – 28 June 1968, also known as Zinoviy Berezhan (Note: Ukrainian: Зіновій Бережан, romanized: Zinovii Berezhan)) was a prominent Ukrainian bandurist, modernist poet, student activist, internist, oncologist, dermatologist, who held a Doctor of Medicine degree (1951).

== Biography ==
Shtokalko was born 25 May 1920 in the West Ukrainian town of Berezhany, the son of a priest. As a youth he showed a great interest in music and folk songs. His family had a bandura which his father rev. Pavlo Shtokalko had purchased in 1925 in Prague. Shtokalko initially took private bandura lessons from Yukhym Klevchutsky, and later, during his studies in Lviv took lessons from the Galician bandurist Yuri Singalevych, and during the war was strongly influenced by Kharkiv bandurists Hryhory Bazhul and Leonid Haydamaka. Shtokalko consistently collected the smallest snippets of information about the bandura and the kobzari and was able to include them in his performances. He consistently worked on collecting and studying everything associated with the bandura and the development of bandura technique.

His technique reached new heights of virtuosity.

Shtokalko was a doctor of medicine by day. His medical studies commenced in Lviv and he completed them in 1950 in Munich after which he emigrated to the United States. During his studies, and later his work, he never neglected his bandura playing.

== Repertoire ==
In the United States, Shtokalko took part in the performances by the bandura ensemble led by Stepan Hanushevsky, performed on Ukrainian Television programs, and gave individual recitals of bandura music. All this took place outside of his work in his busy medical practice. Apart from this he also composed music. He arranged many Ukrainian folk songs, wrote the words to numerous songs, composed instrumental works such as 2 versions of the etude "Son" (Dream), "Oriental etude" and 2 versions of "Atonal etude" where he explored the technical potential of the bandura.

Shtokalko can also be credited with the revival of the ancient byliny (traditional epic poems) of Kievan Rus'. He was able to recreate three byliny: "About the great bohatyr - Illiya Murometz and the Nightingale robber", "About Dobrynia and the Dragon" and "About the great bohatyrs Sviatohor and Illiya Murometz".

== Recordings ==
In his repertoire Shtokalko had a huge reserve of historic songs and dumy (sung epic poems), many of which were recorded during the life of the bandurist. Of the more professional recordings are the dumy: "Marusia Bohuslavka" which was released in 1952 by the SURMA company in New York. After the death of Shtokalko, the renowned collector of Ukrainian recordings Stepan Maksymiuk found the recordings of two more dumy in the archives of Myron Surmach, the tapes of "About Oleksiy Popovych" and "About the escape of three brothers from Oziv". Maksymiuk also discovered a recording of the duma "Kozak Holota" which was done live by an amateur collector during a concert performance of Shtokalko. These three dumy were after editing together with "Marusia Bohuslavka" appeared as a record album sponsored by Myron Surmach of the Surma bookstore in New York City.

The album "O, Dumy Moyi - Pamyati Bandurysta Z. Shtokalka (О, Думи Мої - Пам'яті Бандуриста З. Штокалка)" was released in 1970 on two long play 33 1/3 rpm records. It was released on one cassette in 1985.

O, Dumy Moyi - Pamyati Bandurysta Z. Shtokalka (О, Думи Мої - Пам'яті Бандуриста З. Штокалка) - Zynovii Shtokalko (Зіновії Штокалко) (Surma, 1970, New York)

- Duma pro Oleksiya Popovycha ("Дума про Олексія Поповича") (11:40)
- Siyav Muzhyk Hrechku ("Сіяв Мужик Гречку") (3:12)
- Idy Vid Mene ("Іди Від Мене") (3:30)
- Duma pro Kozaka Holotu ("Дума про Козака Голоту") (7:30)
- Turetskiy Tanets ("Турецький Танець") (3:30)
- Chychitka ("Чичітка") (3:05)
- Duma pro Ozivskykh Brativ ("Дума про Озівських Братів") (13:00)
- Duma pro Marusyu Bohuslavku ("Дума про Марусю Богуславку") (6:45)
- Vyazanka Ukrainskykh Narodnykh Pisen ("Вязанка Украінських Народних Пісень") (3:00)
- Marsh Partyzaniv ("Марш Партизанів") (2:20)

Death brought a halt to the work of Zinovyj Shtokalko. He died 18 June 1968 at the age of 48. Many of his plans were unrealized during his lifetime. Recently his textbook for the bandura was published in both English and Ukrainian. A collection of Ukrainian songs arranged by Shtokalko has also been recently published in Ukraine. (All 3 publications were prepared for publication and edited by Dr. Andrij Horniatkevyc)

== Publications ==
- A Kobzar Handbook (English language edition of "Kobzarskij Pidruchnyk") (translated and annotated by Andrij Hornjatkevyč, 1989, Canadian Institute of Ukrainian Studies, University of Alberta, Edmonton, Alberta)
- Kobzarskij Pidruchnyk (Кобзарський Підручник) (Ukrainian language edition of "A Kobzar Handbook") (edited by Andrij Hornjatkevyč, 1992, Edmonton - Kiev, Canadian Institute of Ukrainian Studies)
- Kobza: Zbirka P'Ies Dlia Bandury (A Collection of Works for the Bandura) (introduction by Andrij Hornjatkevyč, 1997, Edmonton - Kiev, Canadian Institute of Ukrainian Studies) (in Ukrainian)

A collection of his stories and poems entitled "На окраїнах ночі" ("On the outskirts of the night") was published posthumously in 1977 under his author pseudonym Zinoviy Berezhan ("Зіновій Бережан"). It includes a literary portrait of Shtokalko written by Ihor Kostetsky.

== Sources ==
- Odarchenko, Petro - Ukrainski dumy u vykonannia Bandurysta Zinoviya Shtokalka - 1/II/1971
- Horniatkevych, Andrij - Kobzars'ka slava Zinoviya Shtokalky - NTE - 1994, #5-6, pp. 70–72
- Shtokalko Zinoviy - NTE, 1990#6 p 80–81
