= Mykhailo Domontovych =

Ukrainian bandurist (1875–1933)

Mykhailo Domontovych Михайло Домонтович
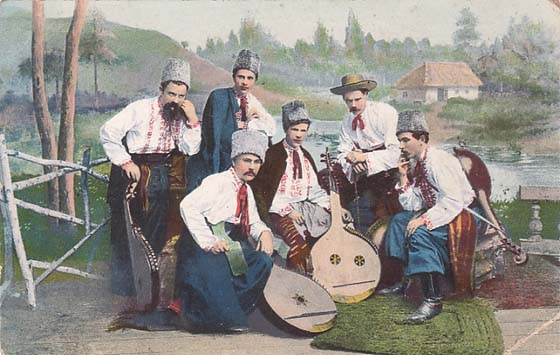
- Student bandurist ensemble in Kyiv directed by Domontovych, c. 1908

Background information
- Born: 1883; Zolotonosha, Russian Empire (present-day Ukraine)
- Died: 1937 (aged 53–54)
- Genres: Folk
- Occupation(s): Writer, kobzar, bandurist
- Instrument: Bandura

Mykhailo Oleksandrovych Domontovych (Note: Ukrainian: Михайло Олександрович Домонтович, romanized: Mykhailo Oleksandrovych Domontovych) (1875? – 1933?, born Mykhailo Oleksandrovych Zlobintsev, (Note: Ukrainian: Михайло Олександрович Злобінцев, romanized: Mykhailo Oleksandrovych Zlobintsev) known also as Mykola (Note: Ukrainian: Микола Олександрович Домонтович, romanized: Mykola Oleksandrovych Domontovych)) was a Ukrainian writer, kobzar, and bandurist.

== Biography ==
Mykhailo (in Yemetz he is noted as being Mykola) Domontovych's real name was Mykhailo Zlobintsev. He was a graduate of Kyiv University, where he completed his studies in mathematics (1909). He used the stage name Domontovych inspired by the fact that he came from the town of Domontiv, not far from Lubny in the Poltava Governorate (province) of the Russian Empire.

In Kyiv he organized one of the first bandura ensembles, which performed to great acclaim in 1906 for the Shevchenko Festivities there. In 1909 he graduated and moved back to Zolotonosha, where he taught mathematics at the men's gymnasia there.

He became one of the first authors of bandura textbooks which he had published in Odessa in 1913–14.

It seems that Domontovych was influenced greatly by the music played by the kobzar Tereshko Parkhomenko. He may have been a student of his guide boy Vasyl' Potapenko. From descriptions of his bandura technique it seemed that he played in a style that was reminiscent of T. Parkhomenko.

Domontovych was a prolific author of poetic and various textbooks in Ukrainian. Some 50 books and pamphlets were published by him on various aspects of Ukrainian culture.

He taught mathematics in Zolotonosha and organised a bandurist ensemble there in the 1920s where all of the instruments were made by the members of the ensemble.

After 1928 we have no information about him. It is thought that by this date he may have been arrested and sentenced or executed.

== Sources ==
- Мізинець В. – Микола Домонтович // "Bandura", 1986, No.17/18, (С.55-57)
- Мішалов В. і М. Українські кобзарі-бандуристи – Sydney, Australia, 1986 - 106с.
- Мішалов В. Бандурист М. Домонтович – Михайло Олександрович Злобінцев // «Гнат Хоткевич – Бандура та її репертуар» // Харків: Фонд національно-культурних ініціатив імені Гната Хоткевича, 2009 – С.243-255.
