= Leonid Haydamaka =

Ukrainian bandurist (1898–1991)

Leonid Hryhorovych Haydamaka
- Леонід Григорович Гайдамака
- Born: April 27, 1898; Kharkiv, Russian Empire (now Ukraine)
- Died: July 21, 1991 (aged 93); New Hampshire, United States
- Occupation: Bandurist

Leonid Hryhorovych Haydamaka (Note: Ukrainian: Леонід Григорович Гайдамака, romanized: Leonid Hryhorovych Haidamaka) (27 April 1898 – 21 July 1991) was a Ukrainian bandurist. has left his impression on the development of bandura art in the 20th century.

Born in Kharkiv the son of a Medical practitioner he studied at the Kharkiv Realschule Gymnasium, and later received an engineering degree at the Kharkiv Institute of Technology.

== Biography ==
From early childhood he became interested in music, and at the age of 10 began to play the violin. During his high school days he played in the school orchestra on the violin and later became the director of the orchestra.

In 1918 Haydamaka entered the Kharkiv Higher Music school (conservatory) where he studied cello and bass for 5 years.

== Interest in the bandura ==
Haydamaka first became interested in the bandura in 1913-14. He took an instrument from his school orchestra to the instrument maker S. Snehiriov for repairs, and he saw there an unknown instrument. Snehiriov explained that the instrument was a Ukrainian folk instrument known as a bandura, and that he was making the instrument for the bandurist-artist of the Kharkiv drama theatre - I. Bondarenko. The bandura interested the young Haydamaka greatly, and Haydamaka ordered an instrument for himself. When the bandura was ready, the question arose - where to learn to play the instrument? Haydamaka chased down Bondarenko and asked him to tune up the instrument and show him some initial exercises. He later devised exercises and pieces for the instrument by himself and began to arrange pieces for the instrument himself.

== The Kharkiv style bandura ==
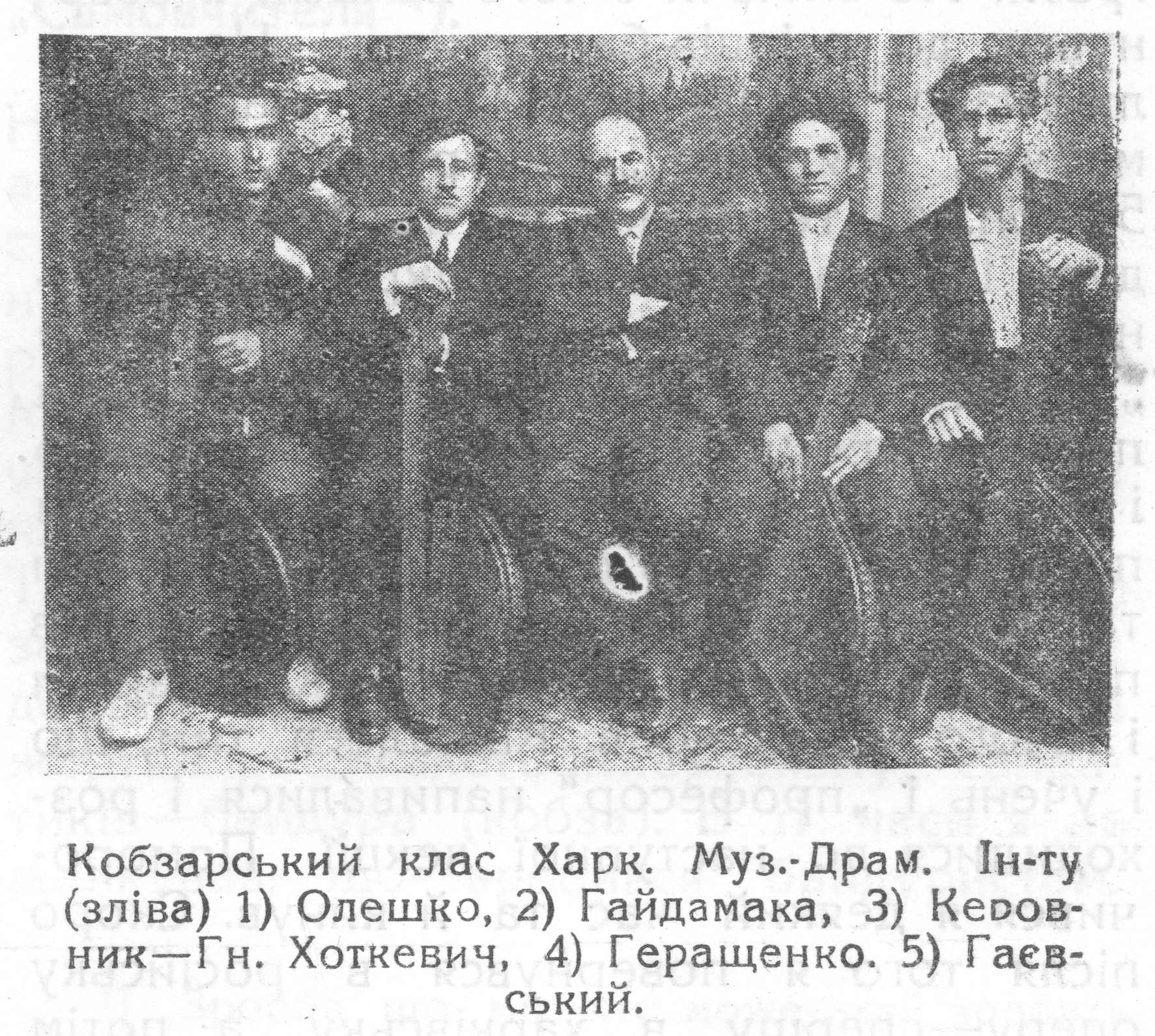
Leonid Haydamaka with H. Khotkevych and the Kharkiv bandura quartet

In 1923 Haydamaka was introduced to Hnat Khotkevych. Khotkevych showed him the manuscript of a bandura textbook which he had prepared for publication and allowed him to copy out technical exercises and pieces, which helped him further develop his technique.

Khotkevych had a small bandura with only two octaves of treble strings. Haydamaka was involved in the development of the concert version of the Kharkiv bandura. He consulted with Khotkevych and on the basis of these consultations he made blueprints for the construction of a diatonic bandura with 8 basses and 23 treble strings which later became the standard for the Kharkiv and Poltava Bandurist Capella which used the Kharkiv technique.

In the 1920s, especially in the second half of the decade a mass interest in the bandura meant the rapid growth of amateur ensembles and bandura choruses, however there was little material such as textbooks or musical arrangements. There was also a lack of qualified professionally trained bandurists. This need was recognized and the People's Komissariat of Education which was headed at that time by Mykola Skrypnyk resolved to form a bandura course at the Kharkiv Music-drama institute for the educating of professional cadres. Hnat Khotkevych was invited to head the position of professor for the bandura courses.

Haydamaka signed up for these courses which he completed in 1930.

== First orchestra of Ukrainian Folk Instruments ==
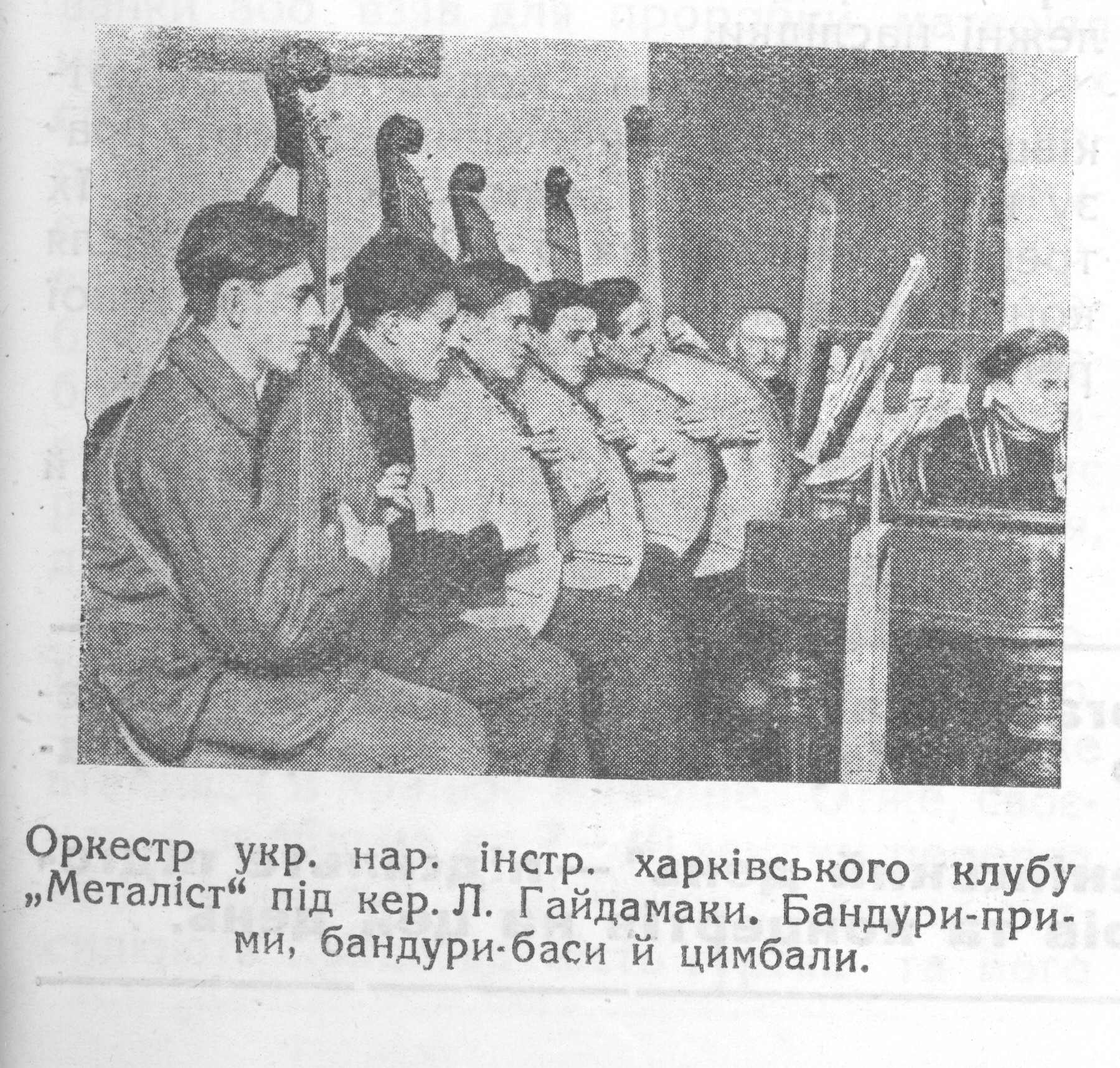
Haydamaka's Orchestra of Ukrainian Folk Instruments

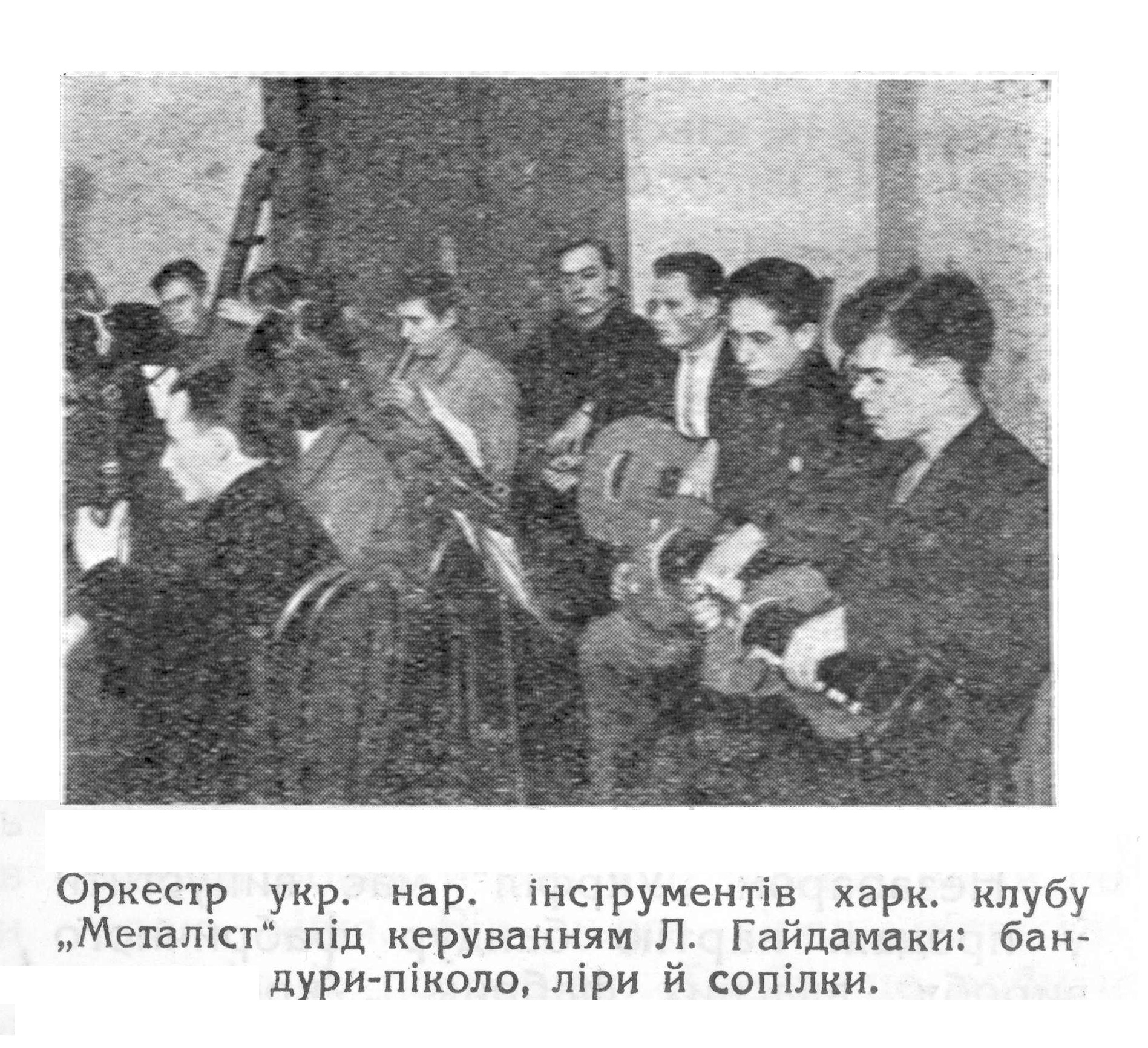
Haydamaka's Orchestra of Ukrainian Folk Instruments

In 1921 Leonid Haydamaka had already formed a bandurist ensemble at the Metalist club, but because of the lack of good quality banduras and the fact that the bandura movement had not yet become mainstream, this attempt was not very successful.

In 1923 the Metalist club obtained money form the government and invited Haydamaka back to try to revive the ensemble. This time Haydamaka was able to negotiate not only the establishment of a bandura ensemble but a whole orchestra of Ukrainian folk instruments.

The money promised was slow in coming and it was only in 1925 after 3 hard years that the orchestra was able to receive a full complement of instruments. In 1925 it consisted of:

14 banduras (3 piccolo, 8 primas and 3 basses) 2 tsymbaly (hammer dulcimers) Prima and bass 4 liry (hurdy-gurdies) - 2 soprano and 2 tenor 2 sopilka (duct flutes) 1 sviril (Pan pipe) 2 trembity (alpine horns) and percussion - drums, timpani and triangle.

The work required to establish any type of orchestra is complicated and difficult, but the process of developing an orchestra of rare and almost forgotten instruments was at times bordering on the impossible. The instruments could not be obtained, and some could only be viewed in museums. Instruments had to be designed and made in a way that they stayed true to the traditional instrument. After instruments were procured, one had to teach players to play on these instruments, and this was an additional problem because written music for these instruments did not exist, and here Haydamaka had to arrange and compose music for the instruments. The scores had to be written and parts copied out and to form this mass into one orchestral whole.

Haydamaka did all this himself and did it the best way he could. Within 7 years the orchestra had given over 500 concerts.

The repertoire of the orchestra included folk songs and classical transcriptions.

In 1929 a number of articles appeared in the "Muzyka Masam" magazine regarding the formation of similar Orchestras of Ukrainian Folk Instruments. A number of orchestrations were also published in the magazine. In 1930 a book of 3 orchestrations was published (1100 copies) containing a number of arrangements for the orchestra. In that year also L. Haydamaka was able to also publish some arrangements for the Kharkiv style bandura.

In 1931 a number of records were recorded and produced in Moscow with recordings of the ensemble.

== Emigration ==
WWII had left its imprint on the Haydamaka family and with the return of Soviet forces they had to leave Ukraine where he wandered through Western Europe. Haydamaka made a living performing, giving concerts and writing out music and orchestrations. In Germany, for a period of time he was a member of the Ostap Veresai Brotherhood directed by Hryhory Bazhul.

After the war he moved to the USA in 1950, where he found employment as a draftsman in a company designing hydro-electric dams in Flushing, Queens, New York where he worked until the age of 74.

He continued to occasionally perform and teach music and the bandura in New York, publishing articles on the history of the bandura in various semi-scholarly journals such as Guitar Review - a journal of the Society of Classical Guitar in 1971. He occasionally attended meetings of the NY Society of Classical Guitar, which was led by his pre-revolutionary friend from Kharkiv - Vladimir Bobri.

After his retirement he moved to New Hampshire to live with his daughter.

Haydamaka died in New Hampshire in 1991.

== Students ==
- Perekop Ivanov
- Illia Filkenberg
- Heorhy Kazakov
- Oleksander Nezovybat'ko

== Publications ==
- Гайдамака, Л.Г. - Оркестр українських народних інструментів // “Музика Масам” 1928, №10-11 (С.6-7)
- Гайдамака, Л.Г. – Оркестр українських народних інструментів – № 2 // “Музика масам” 1929, №1,
- Гайдамака, Л.Г. – Оркестр українських народних інструментів – № 3 // “Музика масам” 1929, №3/4,
- Гайдамака, Л.Г. – Оркестр українських народних інструментів – ч. 4 // “Музика масам” 1929, №5,
- Гайдамака, Л. – “Без тебе Олесю” (М.Лисенка) для оркестру українських народних інструментів // “Музика масам” 1929, №5. (Додаток)
- Гайдамака, Л. –“Дванадцять косарів” (музика К.Богуславського) для оркестру українських народних інструментів - // “Музика масам” 1929, №7/8, (Додаток)
- Гайдамака, Л. – Оркестр українських народних інструментів – № 5 // “Музика масам” 1929, №10/11.
- Гайдамака, Л. – Оркестр українських народних інструментів – № 6 // “Музика масам” 1929, №12.
- Гайдамака, Л.Г. – Революційні пісні для оркестр українських народних інструментів – ДВУ, Х.:1930 (16с.)
- Гайдамака, Л.Г. (арр) - Дванадцять косарів К.Богуславського для бандури соло – серія “Музика трудящим” Х.:1930 – (Реклама поміщена в ж. “Музика масам” 1930, №7/8.) (16с.)
- Гайдамака, Л.Г. – Друга молодість бандури - // “Соціалістична Харківщина” – 24.Х.1936
- Гайдамака, Л.Г. – Спогади – Інтерв’ю на плівці 1984 р. (8 годин)
- Haydamaka, L. – Kobza-bandura – National Ukrainian Musical Instrument // “Guitar Review” №33, Summer 1970 (С.13-18)
- Гайдамака. Л. - Кобза – Бандура // “Бандура” 1986, №17-18. (С.12-16)

== Sources ==
- Мішалов, В. – Бандурист Леонід Гайдамака "Bandura", 1986, №17/18, (С.1-10)
- Ветеран Палій-Неїло – Ще кілька слів про Братство кобзарів імени О. Вересая // “Українські Вісті” 57/58 №115-116, 31.VIII.1947
- Штокалко, З. – Критичні завваги до стану сучасного кобзарства // “Українські вісті” 6.ІІ.1949, Новий Ульм, Німеччина та // “Бандура” 1981, № 3-4, (С.11-15)
- Мішалов, В. – Леонід Гайдамака – Фундатор Бандурного професіоналізму –Матеріали міжнародної науково-практичної конференції – Кобзарство в контексті становлення української професійної культури, 14 жовтня, 2005 р. Київ., 2005. 206 с. (с.107-109)
