= Kharkiv style =

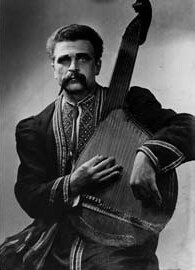
Kharkiv style bandurist - Hryhory Bazhul

The Kharkiv Academic Style of Bandura Playing is a specific method of playing the Ukrainian folk instrument bandura.

The instrument is held in a way that allows both hands equal access to all the strings. Firstly, the left hand has access to the entire range of strings and is not restricted to holding the instrument as it is in other styles and secondly, the right hand similarly has access to play all the treble strings and also all the bass strings.

The manner in which the instrument is held also influences the technique used by the bandurist. In some instances the left hand may use all five fingers in playing. The position in which the bandura is held also means that the 5th finger of the right hand can also be used with more dexterity than in the Kyiv style.

The left hand has two positions for playing. The first position is such that the thumb is used to slide the hand along the edge of the instrument and allowing the remaining four fingers to pluck the strings and the second position is such that the left arm is thrown over the instrument (as shown in photograph of the bandurist) giving the hand access to all the strings so as to either complement or mirror the action of the right hand.

The fact that both hands have access to all of the strings means that both hands are able to pluck the same strings at a fraction of a second apart and thus produce complex tremolos and other effects. It is not possible to create these effects on the Kyiv style bandura and are not possible to be reproduced even when two Kyiv style instruments are played simultaneously.

== See also ==
- Kyiv academic style
