= Kyiv style =

The Kyiv Academic Style of Bandura Playing is a method of playing the Ukrainian folk instrument of bandura.

The instrument is held between the knees perpendicular to the body of the player. This means that the left hand is only able to play easily along the bass strings of the instrument. The right hand usually plays just on the treble strings known as prystrunky.

The manner in which the instrument is held influences the technique used by the bandurist. The left hand uses only the middle three fingers in play. The position in which the bandura is held also means that the 5th finger of the right hand cannot be used effectively.

The Kyiv style is based on the technique used by kobzari of the Chernihiv province such as Tereshko Parkhomenko. It became known as the Kyiv style because the Kyiv Bandurist Capella used it. Before World War II, most Kyiv banduras had diatonically tuned bass strings. Since World War II in Ukraine, chromatic bass tuning is the standard. In the West, however, groups of bandurists exist that adhere to a diatonic bass tuning. Often these bandurists will refer to their playing style as the Chernihiv style of playing the bandura.

== See also ==
- Kharkiv style
