= Hryhory Bazhul =

Ukrainian bandurist (1906–1989)

Hryhory Bazhul Григорій Бажул
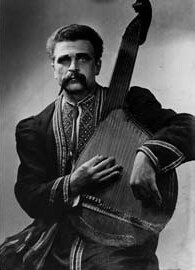
- Hryhory Bazhul with his Kharkiv-style bandura (1948)

Background information
- Also known as: Keleberda
- Born: January 22, 1906; Poltava Governorate, Russian Empire (now Ukraine)
- Died: October 17, 1989 (aged 83) Sydney, Australia
- Genres: Ukrainian folk, dumas and classical music
- Occupation: Bandurist
- Instrument: bandura
- Years active: 1930s to 1980s

Hryhory Ivanovych Bazhul (Note: Ukrainian: Григорій Іванович Бажул, romanized: Hryhorii Ivanovych Bazhul) (January 22, 1906 — October 17, 1989, sometimes spelled Georg Baschul) was a Ukrainian bandurist and publisher of articles on bandura history from Poltava, Russian Empire. After World War II he emigrated to Australia settling in Sydney.

== Early life ==
Bazhul was born in the Poltava Governorate of the Russian Empire (in present-day Ukraine), his father was a rail road engineer and his family moved to Kharkiv in 1911. After completing his studies at the Institute of Grain Culture, he was employed as an agronomist.

In the late 1920s he was arrested and spent 2 years of penal labour at the Berdyansk agricultural labour colony. On his return to Kharkiv he became interested in the bandura after hearing the blind kobzar, Pavlo Keleberda, playing on the streets. In 1931 he enrolled in bandura classes and studied with Hnat Khotkevych in the second group of students established at the Kharkiv worker's conservatory. In 1933, after the classes were closed, he continued to study privately with Khotkevych and soon became a close friend of his family.

In the early 1934, Bazhul was arrested again and charged with improperly giving bread ration coupons to the Khotkevych family during the period of the Famine-Holodomor. He was sentenced to two years in exile in Siberia, northern Caucasus and Tayshet. After serving his sentence he returned to Kharkiv in 1936.

In February 1938, Khotkevych was arrested by the NKVD (Soviet secret police) and in October he was shot in Kharkiv as an enemy of the state with all his possessions confiscated. Khotkevych's widow gave Bazhul a number of her husband's manuscripts for safekeeping. Some 60 manuscripts were preserved by Bazhul, including the original of the epic Bayda.

== War years ==
Hryhory Bazhul published a number of inflammatory anti-Soviet articles, during the Nazi occupation of Kharkiv (1941–1943), in the occupational press about the treatment of kobzars and bandurists by the Soviet regime. He attempted to organise a bandurist capella in Kharkiv and performed numerous solo concerts locally under the non-de-plume of Keleberd. To escape repercussions from the advancing Soviet forces Bazhul moved west.

In Western Ukraine, he formed a bandura trio with Zinoviy Shtokalko and Volodymyr Yurkevych which worked throughout the region, including numerous performances for the soldiers in the Ukrainian Insurgent Army.

Bazhul continued travelling west through Slovakia to Austria. In Vienna, he joined the Ukrainian Bandurist Chorus and eventually became the administrator. At his insistence Volodymyr Bozhyk joined the group, alongside other professional singer non-bandurists primarily from Western Ukraine

He resigned from the Chorus and founded and directed a bandura quintet, the Veresai Brotherhood, which toured the Ukrainian communities in the displaced persons camps in Germany with a program agitating against the return to the Soviet Union of Ukrainians, to great acclaim until 1948.

== Emigration to Australia ==
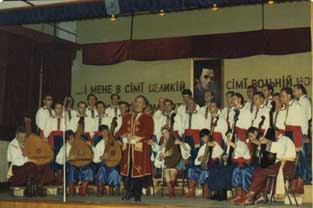
Khotkevych Bandurist Capella Sydney, Australia, 1968.

At the end of the war, in September 1948, Bazhul migrated to Australia. He performed solo at various community functions and ethnic festivals. He established a bandura ensemble in 1958 which toured Australia and made a recording in 1961, when it disbanded. In 1964, he re-established the bandura, which later became the Hnat Khotkevych Ukrainian Bandurist Ensemble. He remained as director until 1971 when Peter Deriashnyj replaced him.

During the ensemble's existence it undertook numerous performances by itself and with the Boyan Choir under the direction of Vasyl Matiash. In 1970, on the basis of the bandura ensemble, Bazhul organised a school for bandura playing.

Bazhul published a number of articles about Khotkevych and his life as a bandurist in various Ukrainian language journals.

Bazhul died on October 17, 1989, in Sydney, aged 83.

== Bibliography ==
- Bazhul, H. "Про бандуру", Нова Україна, 25.ХІІ.1942. - p. 4 (in Ukrainian)
- Bazhul, H. "Спогади про Гната Хоткевича" – Interview recorded on cassette 1984. (90 minutes) (in Ukrainian)
- Bazhul, H. "Гнат Хоткевич", in Новий Обрій, №2, Melbourne, Australia. 1960, pp. 142–149 (in Ukrainian)
- Bazhul, H. "Кобзарське мистецтво в Австралії", Вільна Думка, № 51(1047), Sydney, Australia, 21.XII.1969 (in Ukrainian)
- Bazhul, H. "Альфа і омеґа мистецької одиниці в Сіднеї", Вільна Думка 13.VI.1982, and also in Бандура, 1985, №13-14, pp. 27–32 (in Ukrainian)
- Bazhul, H. "З бандурою по світу", Бандура, 1984, №9/10, pp. 46–52 (in Ukrainian)
