= William Vetzal =

William "Bill" Vetzal (Василь Вецал) (born May 15, 1943 in Oshawa, Ontario) is a Canadian bandura designer and manufacturer.

Vetzal studied the art of bandura making from the Honcharenko brothers in Detroit in the 1970s. Since then he has made over 480 instruments, many of which have incorporated significant design improvements in the construction and the system of mechanisms used to retune the instrument. As a result of consistent efforts in fine craftsmanship with the incorporation of contemporary technologies Vetzal has become the leading maker of banduras in the world.

Vetzal has made instruments for theUkrainian Bandurist Chorus, the Canadian Bandurist Capella and many notable concert bandurists in North America. His instruments are sent out to Ukraine. He has also passed on his bandura making skills and knowledge to Ukrainian craftsmen such as A. Zayaruzny, R. Hrynkiv and Ye. Ptashkin who have traveled to Canada to study under him.

Vetzal has had orders for instruments from around the world, including Ukraine. Instruments made by him are being used by prominent bandurists in Ukraine such as Volodymyr Yesypok and Volodymyr Voyt.

In addition to banduras, Vetzal has also made numerous other Ukrainian folk instruments including kobzas, tsymbaly, sopilkas, volynka-bagpipes, lira- hurdy-gurdies.

== Literature ==
- нн – William Vetzal // «Bandura», #19-20, 1987
- Мiшалов, В. - Майстри Бандур - 2000 // ж. «Bandura», #73/74, 2000
- Mishalow, V. – Bandura makers 2000 // ж. «Bandura», #73/74, 2000
