= Mykola Budnyk =

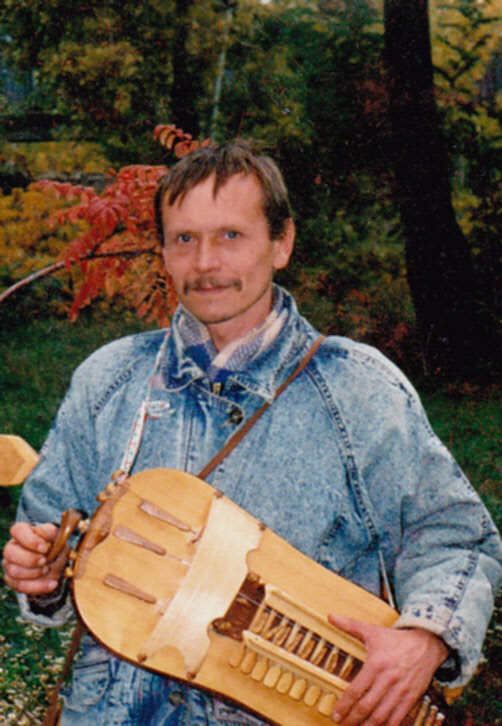
- Mykola Budnyk with lira circa 1995
- Born: 3 February 1953; Skolobiv, near Khoroshiv, Zhytomyr region
- Died: 16 January 2001 (aged 47); Irpin', Kyiv region
- Occupations: kobzar, luthier, Head of Kobzarskyi Tsekh

Mykola Petrovych Budnyk (Ukrainian: Мико́ла Петро́вич Будник) was a luthier and traditional performer in the Kobzar tradition. He was active in authentic construction and recreation of historic folk instruments, and involved in the movement for authentic performаnce practice on Ukrainian folk instruments. Budnyk was also known as a painter and poet. He was born in 1954 in Skolobiv, near Khoroshiv, Zhytomyr region, and died January 16, 2001, in Irpin', Kyiv region.

He was a chairman of the Kyiv Kobzar Guild (Kobzarskyi Tsekh), bandura, known as a master player of folk musical instruments, and as an artist and poet.

== Creative legacy ==
Budnyk recreated 17 types of traditional folk instruments - among them different regional types of the kobza, bandura, lira, husli, hudok, torban, and other traditional Ukrainian musical instruments. Together with Mykhailo Khai, Budnyk formally resurrected the Kobzarskyi Tsekh (Kobzar Guild), uniting like-minded intellectuals interested in the study and revival of authentic traditional music of the kobzars.

Budnyk initially studied traditional kobzar performance from Heorhy Tkachenko in 1978, and made himself a traditional bandura. He had a natural aptitude to authentic instrument construction and made banduras for many of Tkachenko's students. He later made a number of other authentic Ukrainian folk instruments and also began to teach others how to make and play these instruments in an authentic manner. The Kobzar guild he co-created revived traditional performance practices such as street-performance (busking) (Ukrainian: кобзарювання). Much of the repertoire, such as the para-religious psalms and kants, which were previously suppressed in Soviet times as well as the epic form known as dumy were also reintroduced.

Budnyk authored a textbook on making old-type banduras (Ukrainian: старосвітська бандура).

After his death, his recordings were collected and released in the CDa Mykola Budnyk. Hej, na Chornomu mori... Project "My Ukraine. Bervy". (Hey, at the black sea), by Art-Veles

== Teachers ==
In 1980 Budnyk began to learn to play the bandura and the traditional kobza legacy with Heorhy Tkachenko with a small group of contemporaries: Volodymyr Kushpet, Victor Mishalow, Mykola Tovkaylo and others. He began producing old-type bandura, kobza and lira using traditional technology and methods. After Tkachenko's death he took the leadership position of this movement.

== Students ==
Budnyk had many students of the bandura and hurdy-gurdy, including the well-known film producer Oles Sanin, Oleksandr Kit as well as performers Taras Kompanichenko, Taras Sylenko, Ruslan Kozlenko, Pavlo Zubchenko, and Ivan Kushnir.

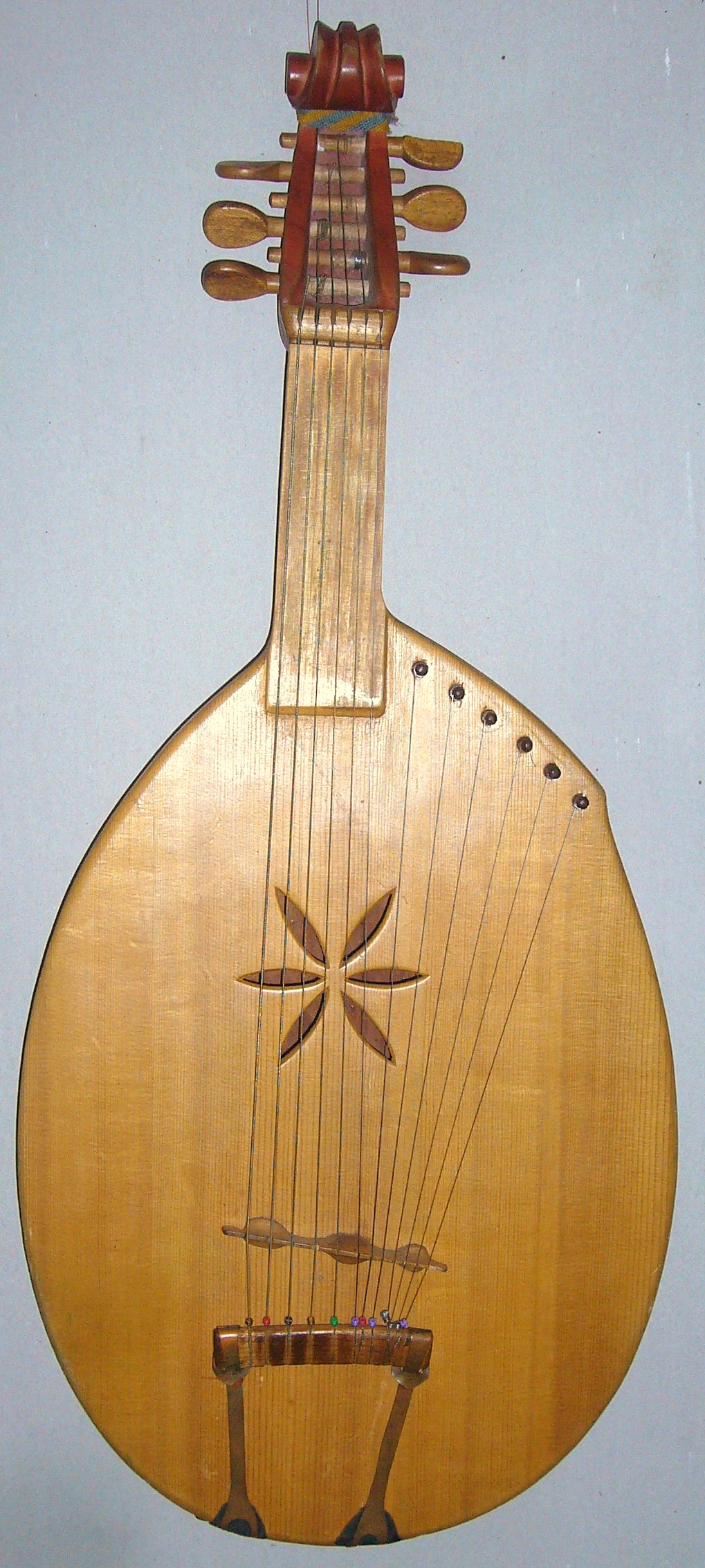
Veresai Bandura often referred to as a kobza - a Ukrainian Lute-like instrument, described by Mykola Lysenko from Ostap Veresay - Ukrainian blind epic singer approx. in 1871

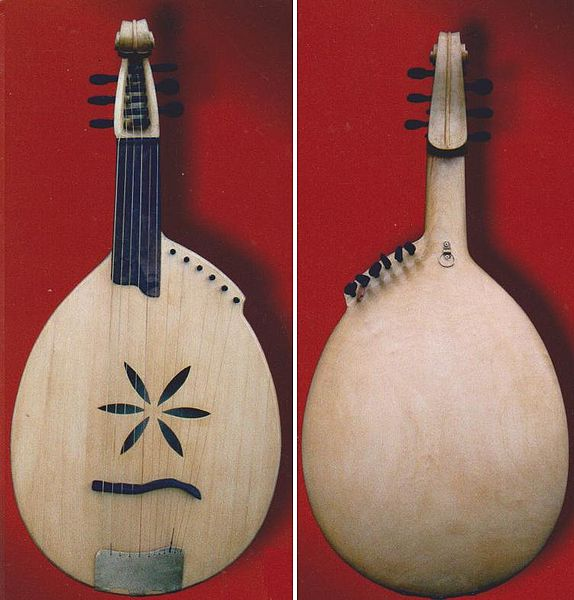
Kobza made by Ruslan Kozlenko (2005, Kyiv, Ukraine) one of students of M. Budnyk
