= Kobza (disambiguation) =

- Kobza is a Ukrainian folk music instrument of the lute family. It may also refer to:
- Kobza (band), a Ukrainian music ensemble
- Kobza (surname), a surname of Eastern European origin

== See also ==
- Kobzar (itinerant Ukrainian bards who sang to their own accompaniment)
