= Blind musicians =

Visually impaired singers or instrumentalists

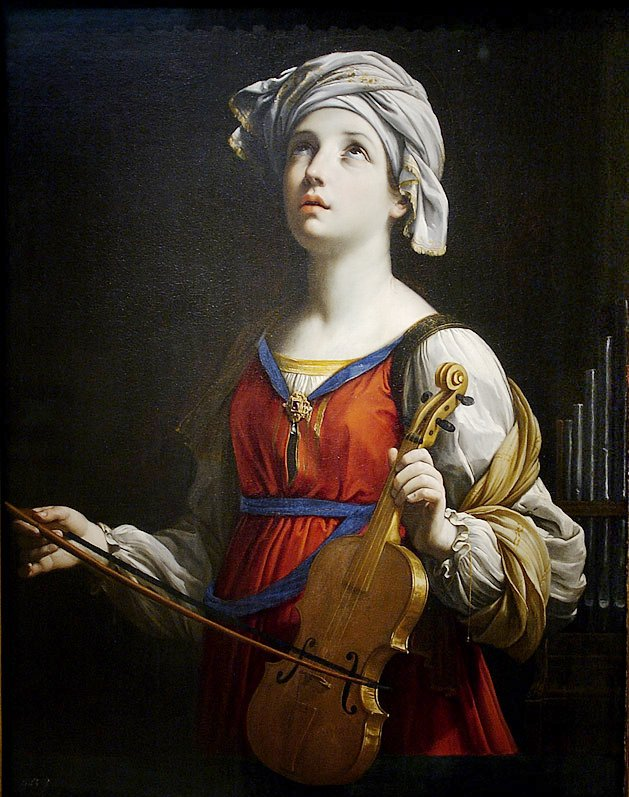
Saint Cecilia by Guido Reni, 1606

Assamese Tukari Geet Sung by Arun Bhuyan, a blind singer from Assam

Blind musicians are singers or instrumentalists, or in some cases singer-accompanists, who are legally blind.

In the past, blind musicians often had to learn on their own because formal training relied heavily on written notation. Today, tools like Braille music and large collections of accessible scores have opened up far more opportunities. Although technology has improved, many programs are still hard to use without sight, but dedicated organizations now offer strong support to help blind musicians learn, create, and grow independently.

== Resources ==
Historically, many blind musicians, including some of the most famous, have performed without the benefit of formal instruction, since such instruction relies extensively on written musical notation. However, today there are many resources available for blind musicians who wish to learn Western music theory and classical notation. Louis Braille, the man who created the braille alphabet for the blind, also created a system of classical notation for the blind called Braille music. This system allows the blind to read and write music much as the sighted do. The largest collection of Braille musical scores is located at the Library of Congress in Washington, D.C. Outside the U.S., the largest collection of braille music scores is stored at the National Library for the Blind in England.

Computer technology and the Internet make it possible in theory for blind musicians to be more independent in composing and studying music. In practice, however, most programs rely on graphical user interfaces, which are difficult for the blind to navigate. There has been some progress in creating screen-reading interfaces for the blind, especially for the Windows operating systems.

Today there are also several organizations devoted to the support of blind musicians. The National Resource Center for Blind Musicians and The Music Education Network for the Visually Impaired are dedicated to musical education for the blind.

== Image ==
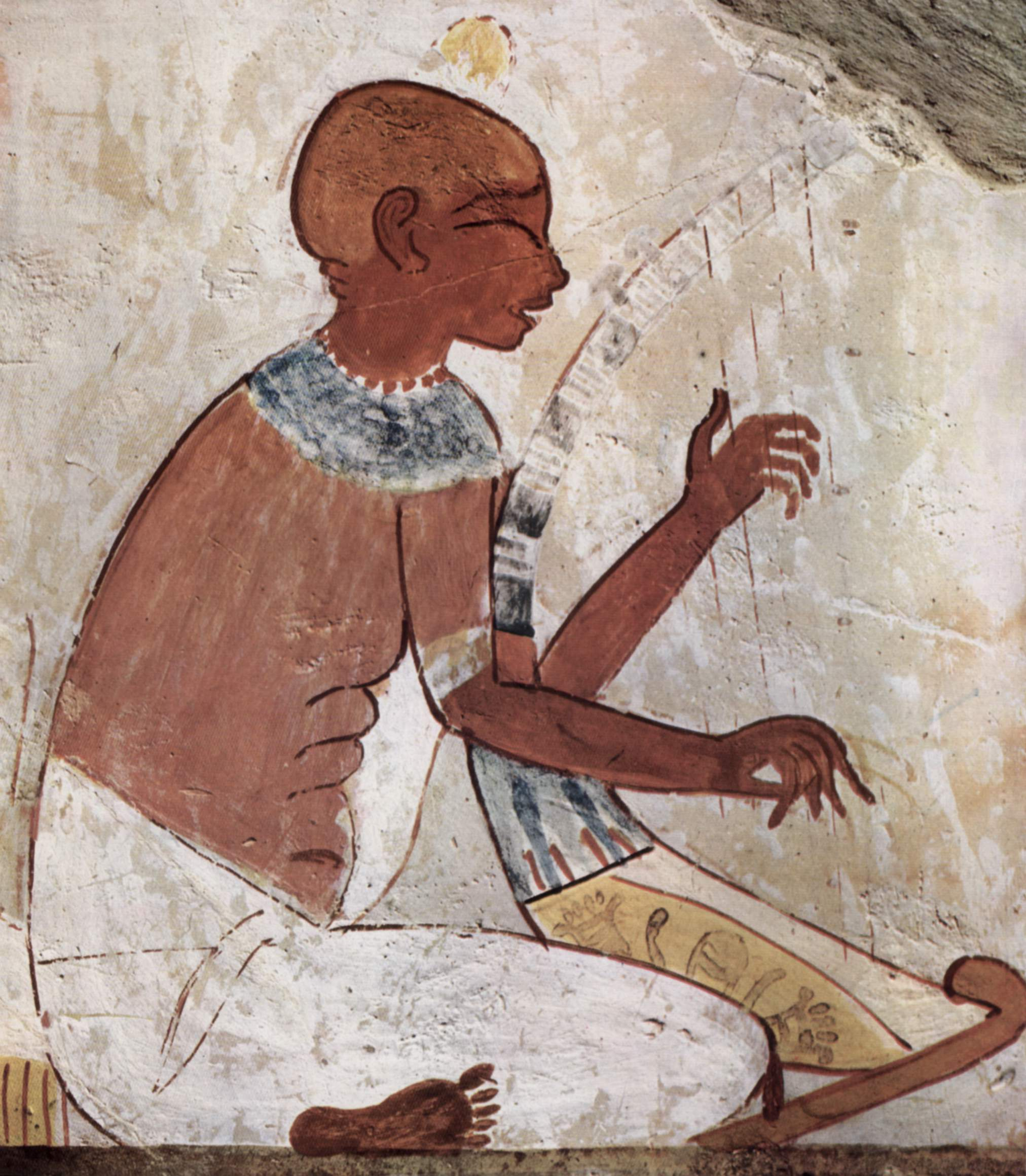
A blind harpist, from a mural of the Eighteenth dynasty of Egypt, 15th century BC

The image of the blind musician is an important touchstone in many cultures, even where the influence of the blind on music has been limited. The idea of Homer, the blind poet, for example, has had a long existence in Western tradition, even though its basis in truth is uncertain. The legendary 6th century Breton druid and bard Kian Gwenc'hlan is depicted as being imprisoned after having his eyes gouged out for refusing to convert to Christianity and singing out that he isn't afraid to die.

In his book Singer of Tales, Albert Lord explains that in Yugoslavia he found many stories of blind musicians, but few current musicians who were actually blind. Natalie Kononenko had a similar experience in Turkey, though one Turkish musician of great talent, Ashik Veysel, was in fact blind. The popularity of the idea of the blind musician has inspired several artists. John Singer Sargent painted a 1912 canvas based on this theme, and Georges de La Tour has a whole series of paintings devoted to blind musicians.

Though the idea of blind musicians may be even more prevalent than their actuality, it remains true that at many points in history and in many different cultures, blind musicians, individually or as a group, have made important contributions to the development of music. Some of these contributions are discussed below.

Blind musicians have also appeared in Muslim harems to entertain the patron and his wives.

Robert Heinlein made a science fiction use of the "blind bard" theme in "The Green Hills of Earth".

== Blind musicians in tradition ==
=== In China ===
Court musician was a traditional profession for the blind in China in antiquity. The first musician mentioned in Chinese sources, Shi Kuang, was a blind performer in the 6th century BC. The Guilds of Blind Musicians and Fortune-Tellers, which were still around in China during the middle of the 20th century, claimed to have existed as far back as 200 BC. More recently, groups of blind buskers have continued to perform in Zuoquan County, and presumably in other areas as well.

One of the most popular musical works in China, "Erquan Yingyue (Moon Reflected in the Second Spring)", was composed in the first half of the 20th century by Hua Yanjun, better known as "Blind Ah Bing".

=== In Japan ===
In Japan, Heike Biwa, a form of narrative music, was invented and spread during the Kamakura period (1185–1333) by traveling musicians known as biwa hoshi, who were often blind. These musicians played the biwa, a kind of lute, and recited stories, of which the most famous was The Tale of the Heike. The musicians were sometimes known as "blind priests" because they wore robes and shaved their heads, though they were not in fact Buddhist priests.

Goze were similar communities of visually impaired female shamisen and kokyū players who travelled around the country singing songs and begging alms.

=== Kobzars of Ukraine ===
There is a long tradition of performance by blind minstrels in Ukraine known as Kobzarstvo. At least from 1800 to 1930 — and probably well before that as well — the majority of itinerant musicians in Ukraine were blind. Music was an important part of the culture. Those who could not work at other occupations could be apprenticed to become professional bards, often referred to as kobzars (both bandura and lira players could be referred to by this title). These wandering blind minstrels were divided into two groups—bandurists, or kobzars who played bandura, and lirnyks, who played the lira, which was a crank-driven hurdy-gurdy.

The kobzars were an important part of oral tradition in Ukraine. According to the ethnographer P. Zhytetsky, kobzars were thought to have been initially sighted Cossacks, who were especially associated with epic songs, or dumas. Kononenko states that lirnyks, on the other hand, were blind church singers organized into guilds who sang religious songs and were often associated with beggars. By the middle of the 19th century, the two groups had merged; both sang many different types of songs, all were organized into the guilds, and all were blind.

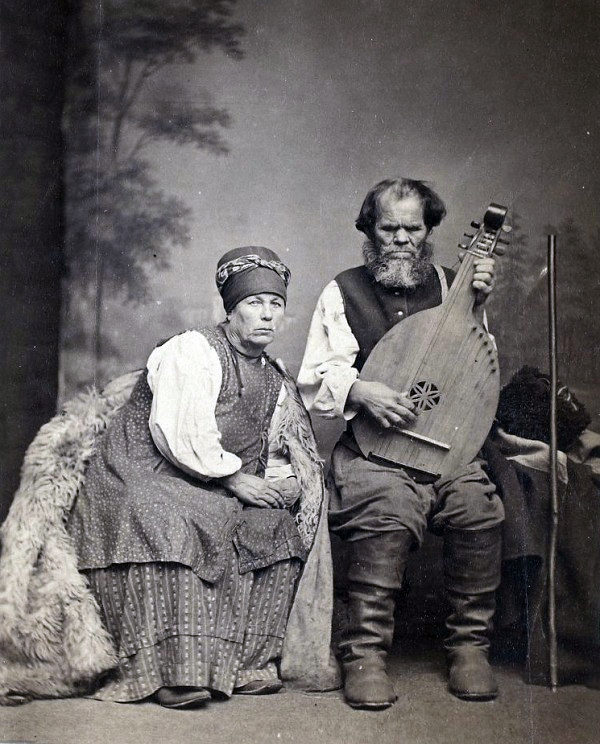
Ostap Veresai, the most famous kobzar of the 19th century, with his wife. Like the other kobzars of his day, Veresai was blind.

The kobzars have a central place in the national identity of Ukraine. Folklorist Izmail Sreznevskyi argued that the initial Cossack bandurists were actual witnesses of the great battles about which they sang. The image of warrior-bards singing epics was quite popular, and there became a tradition that the great ancient singers were veterans valorously blinded in combat. This in turn led to the belief that the kobzar tradition had greatly weakened in the 19th century, since the traditional songs were now sung by people who were more like beggars than like warriors. Kononenko points out that there is no factual basis for this image, and her research showed that the minstrel tradition was still very strong and creative up until the 1930s.

Because the art of the kobzars was language-specific and included themes dealing with historic subjects of Ukraine's past, the blind singers were often the focus of persecution by occupying powers, according to researcher Mikhailo Khay. This persecution reached its height under Joseph Stalin in the 1930s, when many forms of Ukrainian cultural expression were crushed by the communist government of the Soviet Union. In the late 1930s many bandurists were arrested and some shot. Documents have been discovered to show that the renowned bandurist Hnat Khotkevych was executed in 1938 and the blind kobzar Ivan Kucherenko was shot in 1937.

Numerous sources claim that there was an organized large scale massacre of Ukrainian blind musicians in the 1930s, though this has not been confirmed by official documents, and most details of the incident (including year, place, and method of execution) are disputed. Traditional blind minstrelsy by the late 1930s had largely vanished.

Today, the traditional repertoire of the kobzars is performed by sighted, educated performers. During her research in Ukraine, Kononenko found only one blind folk performer of the old songs, a man named Pavlo Suprun, who had studied bandura playing and voice at the Kiev State Conservatory.

=== Traditional Irish musicians ===
During the medieval and early modern eras, harpists, pipers, and other musicians traveled around Ireland, providing music for dances and other occasions. As in Ukraine, many of the Irish musicians were blind. It was common practice for blind or disabled children to be taught a musical instrument as a means of supporting themselves, as they could not perform hard labour.

The most famous of these blind musicians, harper Turlough O'Carolan, composed many tunes that have become part of the traditional repertoire, including "Sidh Beag Sidh Mór" and "Carolan's Concerto".

Others included Eoghain Ó Cianáin (fl. 1540), Nicholas Dáll Pierce (fl. 1601), William fitz Robert Barry (fl. 1615), Ruaidri Dáll Ó Catháin (died 1653), Higgins of Tyrawley (fl. 18th century), and Martin O'Reilly (1829–1904).

=== Blind organists in Europe ===
There is a long tradition of blind organists, including Louis Braille himself. In the 20th century some of the greatest organists were blind, including the great German Bach scholar and teacher Helmut Walcha (1907–1991), and a number of prominent French organists and composers for the organ including Louis Vierne (1870–1937), Andre Marchal (1894–1980), Gabriel Gauthier (1808-1853), Gaston Litaize (1909–1991), and Jean Langlais (1907–1991), as well as one of the current organists at Notre Dame de Paris, Jean-Pierre Leguay (b. 1939). England has also produced brilliant blind organists in the 18th, 19th and 20th centuries, including John Stanley (1712-1786), John Purkis (1781-1849), George Warne (1792-1868), William Wolstenholme (1865-1931), Alfred Hollins (1865-1942) and David A. Liddle (b. 1960), the latter a student of Marchal and who currently enjoys an international performing career. Yet it is a tradition which goes back even further: to 14th-century Italian Francesco Landini (?–1397) and Spanish baroque master Antonio de Cabezon (1510–1566). One could argue that even Johann Sebastian Bach and George Frederic Handel, who lost their sight late in life but presumably continued to play and compose, should be included in this discussion, along with the great American popular organist George Wright (1920–1998), who likewise lost his sight late in life but continued to present concerts and make sound recordings until his death. Blind composer Frances McCollin (1892–1960) won the Clemson Prize from the American Guild of Organists in 1918. She studied organ with another blind musician, David Duffield Wood (1838–1910), the organist at Philadelphia's St. Stephen's Episcopal Church for many years.

=== Blind piano tuners ===
In 19th century France and England, piano tuners were frequently blind. The first blind piano tuner is thought to be Claude Montal, who taught himself how to tune a piano while studying at L'Institut National des Jeunes Aveugles in 1830. At first Montal's teachers were skeptical, doubting that a blind man could actually perform the necessary mechanical tasks. Montal's skill was undeniable, however, and he was soon asked to teach classes in tuning to his fellow students. Eventually, he also overcame public prejudice, and landed several prestigious jobs as a tuner for professors and professional musicians. Montal's success paved the way for other blind tuners, both in France and in England, where Montal's example and teaching methods were adopted by Thomas Rhodes Armitage. Today the image of the blind piano tuner is so ingrained that people in England sometimes express surprise when they encounter a piano tuner who can see. An organization of blind piano tuners remains active in Britain.

=== American country blues ===
Blind musicians have made a significant contribution to American popular music. This is particularly true in blues, gospel, jazz, and other predominantly African American forms – perhaps because discrimination at the time made it more difficult for black blind people to find other employment. In any case, the achievement of blind African-Americans in music is extensive. The first recorded gospel sanctified barrelhouse piano player, Arizona Dranes, was blind, as were Al Hibbler, and Ray Charles, one of the most important figures in the creation of soul music. Art Tatum, commonly cited as the greatest jazz pianist of all time, was also almost blind. Stevie Wonder, who is blind from birth, has recorded more than thirty U.S. top ten hits and won twenty-two Grammy Awards (the most ever won by a solo artist in history).

However, blind black musicians are still most strongly associated with the country blues. The first successful male country blues performer, Blind Lemon Jefferson, was blind, as were many other country bluesmen, including Blind Willie McTell, Blind Willie Johnson, Sonny Terry, Blind Boy Fuller, Blind Blake and Reverend Gary Davis. The figure of the blind country bluesman became so iconic that when Eddie Lang, a sighted jazz guitarist, wanted to choose a black pseudonym for purposes of recording blues records with Lonnie Johnson, he naturally settled on Blind Willie Dunn. Bogus Ben Covington was known for pretending to be blind. John William Boone, known as "Blind Boone", was an important American pianist and composer of ragtime.

== Blind individual musicians in history ==
- Shi Kuang
- Francesco Landini
- Antonio de Cabezón
- Joaquín Rodrigo
- Rudolf Braun
- Irène Fuerison
- Turlough O’Carolan
- Friedrich Ludwig Dülon
- Michio Miyagi
- Takahashi Chikuzan

== Modern blind musicians ==
Ronnie Milsap is an American singer, songwriter, and musician. He began his career as a R&B and soul artist, but is most known for his country and pop music career. Jeff Healey was a blind Juno Award-winning and Grammy Award-nominated Canadian blues-rock vocalist and guitarist, who attained musical and personal popularity, particularly in the 1980s and 1990s. The American guitarist and songwriter, Doc Watson, was blinded before his first birthday from an eye infection, and went on to become an influential musician in American bluegrass and folk music, known for his proficient flatpicking and fingerpicking skills on guitar as well as his extensive knowledge of traditional American songs.

The Italian pop tenor, Andrea Bocelli, who was born with congenital glaucoma and completely lost his sight at the age of 12, after a football accident, is the biggest-selling singer in the history of classical music, with worldwide sales exceeding 70 million copies.

In 2009, Japanese Nobuyuki Tsujii, at age 20, became the first blind pianist to win the top prize at a major international competition, the 13th Van Cliburn International Piano Competition. He was also awarded the Beverley Taylor Smith Award for the Best Performance of a New Work. He played all twelve of Frédéric Chopin's Op. 10 Études as part of his performance in the preliminaries. Born blind, Tsujii developed his own technique for learning complex classical piano works. With videos of his piano performances widely viewable on the Internet, Tsujii's competition win has made him an international sensation. As of 2010, Tsujii's discography includes ten CDs, some of which have sold over 100,000 copies. As a Van Cliburn winner, Tsujii has been performing in concerts all over the world.

One of the prominent blind South Indian carnatic musicians is M. Chandrasekaran, a violin maestro who has received some of the highest awards by many musical institutions in India. His musical career spans over six decades and he has travelled to perform in many music festivals all over India and the world.

Ravindra Jain (28 February 1944 – 9 October 2015) was an Indian blind-born music composer, lyricist and playback singer. He started his career in the early 1970s, composing for hit movies such as Chor Machaye Shor (1974), Geet Gaata Chal (1975), Chitchor (1976) and Ankhiyon Ke Jharokhon Se (1978). He composed music for many films and TV shows based on Hindu epics, including Ramanand Sagar's Ramayan (1987). He was awarded the Padma Shri, the fourth-highest civilian award of the Republic of India in 2015 for his contribution to the arts.

== Others ==
- Blessing Offor
- The Blind Boys of Alabama
- Charlotte
- George Shearing
- José Feliciano
- Lachi
- Moondog
- Ray Charles
- Roland Kirk
- Stevie Wonder
- Marcus Roberts
