= Eduard Drach =

Ukrainian musician (born 1965)

Eduard Drach Едуард Драч
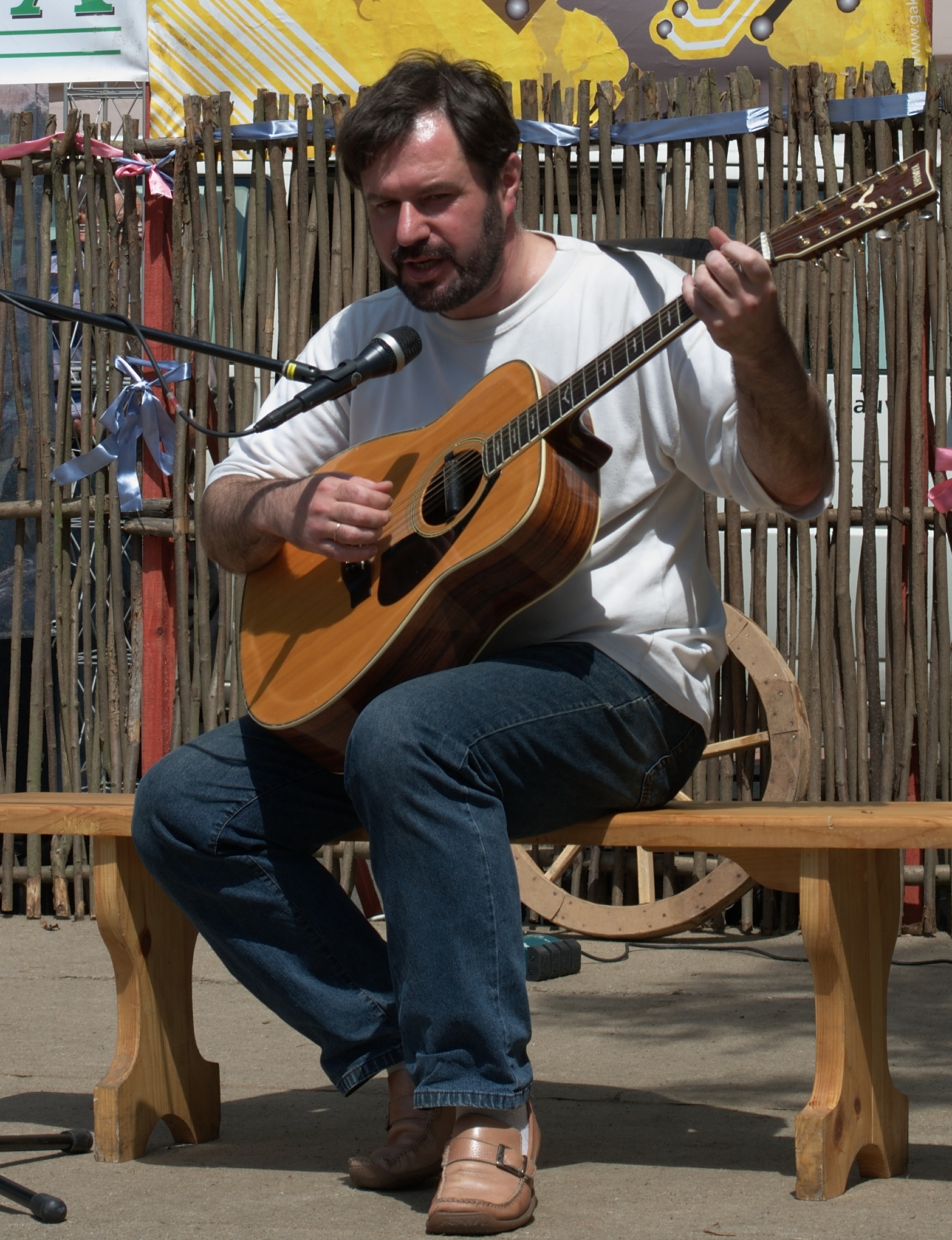
- Drach in 2009

Background information
- Born: 1965 (age 60–61); Kryvyi Rih, Ukrainian SSR, Soviet Union
- Genres: Ukrainian folk music
- Occupations: Neurologist, musician
- Instruments: violin; guitar; keyboards; bass guitar; mandolin; banjo; kobza; bandura; husli; lira

Eduard Valeriiovych Drach (Note: Ukrainian: Едуард Валерійович Драч, romanized: Eduard Valeriiovych Drach) (Ukrainian: Едуард Валерійович Драч, born 1965), is a composer, singer-songwriter, and multi-instrumentalist. He is an active member of the Kyiv Kobzar Guild. The author of numerous songs in a variety of styles, Drach is noted in particular for his original psalms in the Ukrainian historical folk style.

Drach was born in Kryvyi Rih, Dnipropetrovsk Oblast, in the Ukrainian SSR of the Soviet Union (present-day Ukraine) and was educated as a physician and still works as a neurologist, his career in music notwithstanding. His first instrument was the violin. He went on to become a prize-winning singer-songwriter at numerous festivals, in particular the 1989 Chervona Ruta Festival.

Drach's musical styles include ballads, traditional folk songs, folk rock, folk jazz, and folk avant-garde. Apart from the violin, he also plays guitar, keyboards, bass guitar, mandolin, banjo, kobza, bandura, husli, and lira. Several of his songs have been adapted for lute or torban by Roman Turovsky.

== Bibliography ==
- Catharsis – song texts and poems (2007)

== Discography ==
- Небо України (Nebo Ukrainy) (1994)
- Двом Душам Дарується (Dvom dusham darujet'sia) (2005)
- Про Славу І Багатство (Pro slavu y bahatstvo) (2011)
