= Volodymyr Kushpet =

Ukrainian musician

Volodymyr Kushpet Володимир Кушпет

Background information
- Born: April 6, 1948 (age 78); Vyazma, Russian SFSR, Soviet Union
- Genres: Folk
- Occupations: Kobzar; lirnyk
- Instruments: Singing, torban, kobza, bandura, lira

Volodymyr Hryhorovych Kushpet (Note: Ukrainian: Володимир Григорович Кушпет, romanized: Volodymyr Hryhorovych Kushpet) (born April 6, 1948) is an influential Ukrainian baritone singer, and player on torban, kobza, bandura and lira, he is noted for reconstruction of traditional playing techniques on these instruments. He is the author of a primer for these instruments and an in-depth study of the institution of Kobzar Guilds, associations of itinerary blind singers in Ukraine.

== Biography ==
Volodymyr Kushpet studied bandura initially under Andriy Omelchenko and then later completed his studies at the Kyiv Conservatory under Serhiy Bashtan. Along with Kost Novytsky he was one of the founding members of the KOBZA pop group and played an electrified bandura in the ensemble.

Later Kushpet performed in an instrumental bandora duo with Novytsky playing primarily classical transcriptions of instrumental works on the bandura. Kushpet beceameinterested in the authentic bandura and the kobza as played by Ostap Veresai, after being introduced to Heorhy Tkachenko. From the transcriptions made by M. Lysenko in the 1870s Kushpet has managed to restore most of the repertoire performed by Veresai.

Kushpet teaches at the kobzar school in Strytivka near Kyiv and at one time at the Kharkiv Musical-Drama Institute. Recently he has also taught the torban for a short period of time at the Kyiv Conservatory.

== Publications ==
- Kushpet, V. - "Samonavchytel' hry na starosvits'kykh muzychnykh instrumentakh" - K. 1997
