= Yuriy Fedynsky =

Yuriy Fedynsky Юрій Фединський
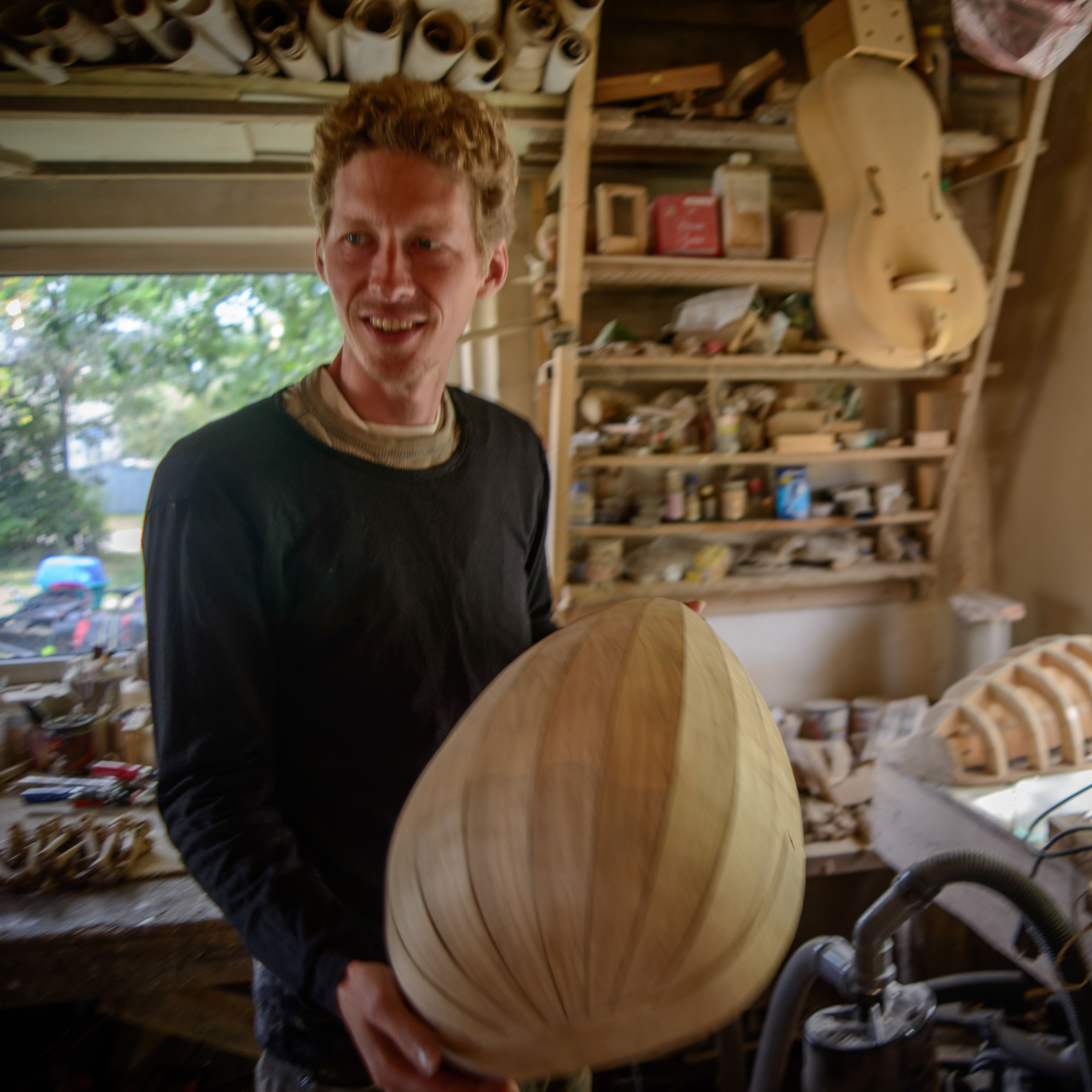

Background information
- Born: 1975 (age 50–51); United States
- Genres: Folk
- Occupations: Composer, musician, singer-songwriter
- Instruments: Singing, kobza, torban, bandura

Yuriy Fedynsky (Note: Ukrainian: Юрій Фединський, romanized: Yurii Fedynskyi) (Ukrainian: Юрій Фединський, born 1975) is a Ukrainian-American composer, musician, singer-songwriter, producer, bandleader, luthier, cultural activist, and pedagogue. Fedynsky performs on kobza, torban, and traditional bandura.

He was born in the United States, but moved permanently to his ancestral Kyiv, (Ukraine) after the break-up of the USSR, specifically to pursue a career in Ukrainian folklore.

He studied piano under Henry Doskiy and bandura under Julian Kytasty. He is one of the founding members of the Experimental Bandura Trio, together with Julian Kytasty and Michael Andrec. He performed with the Detroit-based Ukrainian Bandurist Choir. He also collaborated with Ukrainian rock band Haydamaky. He is also a co-founder of several ensembles, in particular The Carpathians, Run Through the Jungle and Chorea Cozacky (with Taras Kompanichenko. He is a member in Kyiv Kobzar Guild. As of 2016, he joined the Ukrainian folk ensemble "Drevo" from the Poltava region.

Fedynsky is a luthier of such instruments as kobza, bandura, torban, hurdy-gurdy. He founded a guild of makers and performers in the village of Kryachkivka. The annual music festival "Drevo Rodu Kobzarskoho" takes place in the village

== Films ==
- Comeback 2009. режисери Сергій Цимбал і Наталка Фіцич; документальний фільм про відродження української музичної традиції, через творчість Михаїла Тафійчука, Drevo, Наталки Половинки, і Юрія Фединського. Номінація на європейський конкурс з кіноматографії prix europa, 2009, Берлін. (directed by Sergei Tsymbal and Natasha Fitsych, a documentary about the revival of Ukrainian musical tradition through the work of Michael Tafiychuks, Tree (from Poltava), Natasha Polovikin, and Yuri Fedynsky. Nominated for European competition for the cinomatografic prize Europa, 2009, Berlin.)
- Kobzar 2008. Закрита зона; документарний фільм про културну діялність Юрія Фединського в Україні (відновлення кобзарської традиції, його музичниі проекти, дослідження музичних інструментів і майстрування). Представлений на кінофестивалі Лев, 2009, Львів. (Closed Zone, a documentary film about cultural activist Yuri Fedynsky in Ukraine (recovery of the kobzar tradition, his musical projects, study of musical instruments and handiwork). Presented at the International Film Festival Lev, 2009, Lviv)

== Discography ==
- Три брати рідненькі 2009. Traditional Duma reconstructions
- Хорея Козацький 2008. Ukrainian music of the Renaissance and Baroque Eras
- Карпатіяни 2004
- Run Through the Jungle 2004
- Юрій Фединський бандурист-композитор 2000
- Experimental Bandura Trio 1998
