= Prystrunky =

Ukrainian folk music term

Prystrunky (Ukrainian: приструнки, sg. приструнок) is a term used for the additional unfretted strings strung across the body of Ukrainian folk instruments such as the kobza, bandura, and torban. Translated into English, Prystrunky means “near the strings”. These additional strings are thought to have appeared on these instruments as early as the 17th century. Others feel that these additional strings appeared later in the mid to late 18th century. On the contemporary bandura they are now the main strings on which the performer plays, and are similar to the super treble strings on a harp guitar.

== Kobza ==
The traditional Ukrainian kobza had several strings (from 2 to 7), which were plucked like a harp, in contrast to strings that were pressed against the neck, as when playing a lute. Due to the neck (and some modern and traditional designs even have a neck with frets, such as the kobza of Pavlo Konoplenko-Zaporozhets), which allowed the game to be played in several keys, a few strings were not necessary in principle to reproduce the melody. Therefore, there were always not very many of them, much less than in banduras, and some modern designs do not contain pods at all. The original kobza also did not contain any impurities.

== Bandura ==
In bandura, the playing of both basses and strings is conducted in a harp-like manner. Each string plays only one sound and the tonality (while playing) cannot be changed. Therefore, to fully reproduce the melody, it needs more strings – at least 14–16 strings (in total), of which 4–6 are on the fretboard. At the same time, unlike the kobza, the melody is performed by the strings, and the strings on the neck are used as basses.
