= Andriy Matviyevych Bobyr =

Ukrainian musician

- Андрій Матвійович Бобир
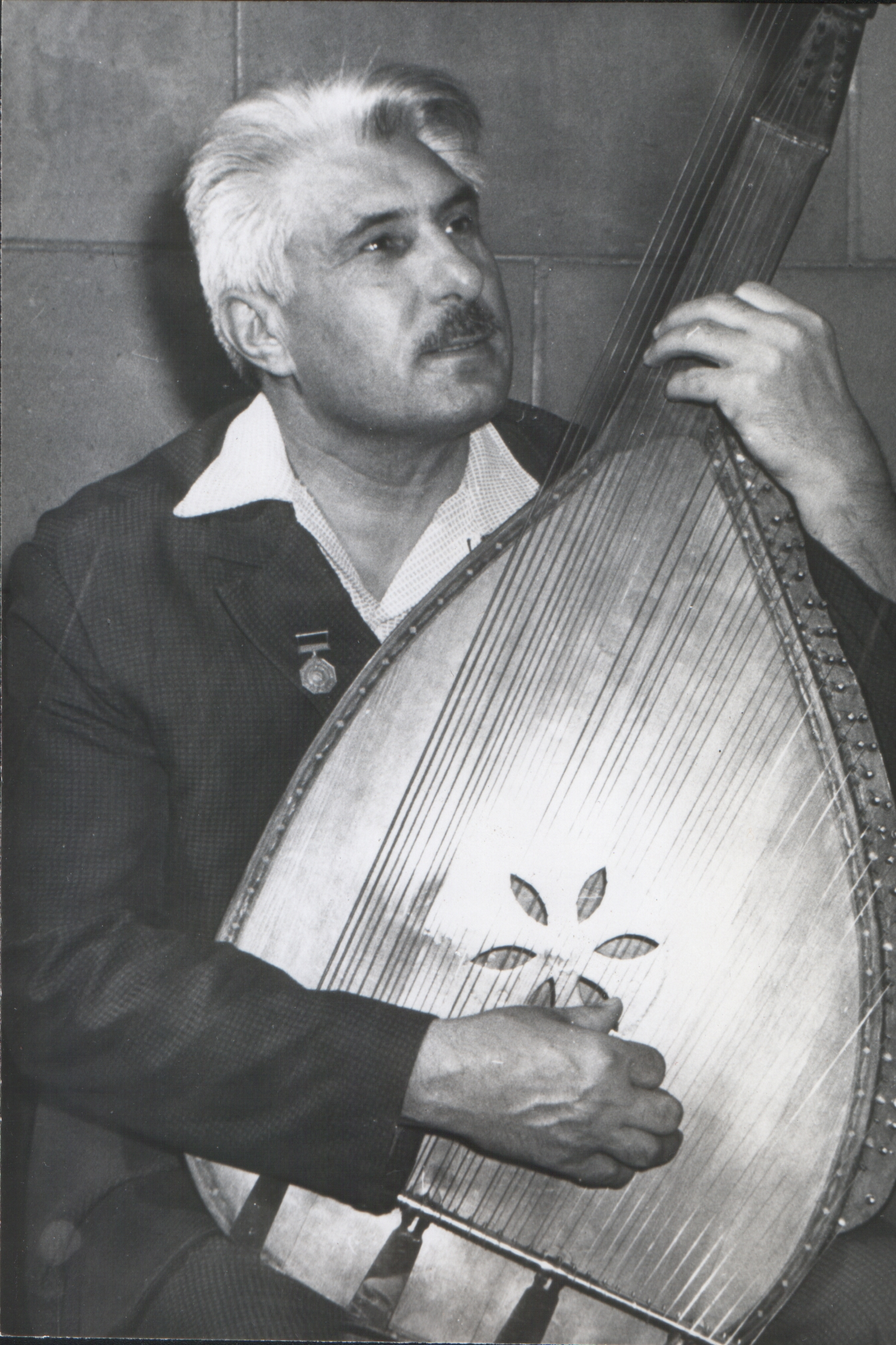
- Bobyr in 1970
- Born: November 13, 1915; Nychyporivka, Poltava Governorate, Russian Empire (present-day Ukraine)
- Died: May 18, 1994 (aged 78); Kyiv, Ukraine
- Occupations: Bandurist, teacher, conductor

Andriy Matviyevych Bobyr (Note: Ukrainian: Андрій Матвійович Бобир, romanized: Andrii Matviiovych Bobyr) (13 November 1915 – 18 May 1994) was a Ukrainian bandurist, teacher, conductor, and People's Artist of Ukraine (1986).

== Life and work ==
Andriy Bobyr was born in the village of Nychyporivka, in the Poltava Governorate of the Russian Empire.

In 1931 he completed his studies at the Kyiv Music Tekhnikum, and in 1947 the conservatory (class of Hryhory Veriovka; he also studied with Grigory Kompaneyets). In 1951 he completed post graduate studies.

In 1936 he became a member of the Radio Bandurist Capella and later its director.

During World War II he became a fighter pilot. In 1946 he returned to Kyiv to direct the Radio Bandurist Capella. In 1965 the Capella was transformed into the Orchestra of Ukrainian Folk Instruments of the Ukrainian Television and Radio.

Bobyr was teacher of bandura at the Kyiv Conservatory from 1938 to 1941, and from 1949 to 1979.

His repertoire included numerous dumy (sung epic poems):

- Marusia Bohuslavka
- The three brothers from Oziv
- About the widow and her three sons

== Students ==
Mykola Hvozd', Serhiy Bashtan, Vasyl' Herasymenko, N. Moskvina, Andriy Omelchenko, Victor Kukhta, V. Lobko, Yuri Demchuk, Mykola Nechyporenko, Volodymyr Voyt
