= Andriy Omelchenko =

Ukrainian bandurist and composer (1926–1981)

Andriy Omelchenko Андрій Омельченко
- Born: 2 July 1926; Pavlysh, Ukrainian SSR, Soviet Union
- Died: 9 May 1981 (aged 54) Kiev, Ukrainian SSR, Soviet Union
- Genres: Folk
- Occupations: Bandurist; Composer
- Instrument: Bandura

Andriy Fedorovych Omelchenko (Note: Ukrainian: Андрій Федорович Омельченко, romanized: Andrii Fedorovych Omelchenko) (2 July 1926 – 9 May 1981) was a Ukrainian virtuoso bandura soloist and composer. He taught bandura at the Ukrainian Institute of Culture and performed outside the Soviet Union.

== Biography ==
Omelchenko was born in Pavlysh, Soviet Union and initially began to play bandura from tutelage by Makar Osadchyj in Dniprodzerzhynsk and joined the bandura capella there. In 1947 he played bandura in a military ensemble. In his biography he stated that he took some of his first bandura lessons from Hryhory Kytasty.

In 1956 he completed both the vocal and orchestral faculties of the Kiev Conservatory. He continued to study bandura under Volodymyr Kabachok and Andriy Bobyr.

From 1952 he worked as a soloist of the Bandura Ensemble of Ukrainian Radio. From 1954 he taught bandura at the special music high school in Kiev, and from 1961 at the Kiev Music College.

As a soloist he performed in Czechoslovakia, Poland, Finland and France. He was a laureate of the international competition of performers on folk instruments which took place in Moscow in 1957.

He published a series of collections of music for the bandura and composed a number of individual works. In 1967 he edited the "Handbook for the bandura" by Mykola Opryshko.

In 1963 he completed post graduate studies at the Kiev Conservatory and in 1968 he received the title of Candidate of Arts for his thesis on the development of the bandura.

He continued to work on a doctoral dissertation on Ukrainian folk instruments while teaching bandura at the Institute of Culture.

He died of liver cancer on May 9, 1981 in Kiev, Soviet Union.

== Publications ==
- 1965 - Bandura i mystetstvo bandurystiv za radians'koho chasu - "NTE" #4
- 1967 - Mystetsvo bandurystiv na pidneinni - NTE #6 (pp. 33–35)
- 1967 - Seminar kerivnykiv kapel ta ansambliv bandurystiv - NTE -
- 1968 - Vstup do obr. "Oj poplyvy, vutko" - M. Opryshky. - MTE - #6 (p. 87-8)
- 1968 - Razvitie kobzarskgo iskusstva na Ukraine. Avtoreferat K. - (pp. 25)
- 1974 - Za tradytsieiu narodnykh spivtsiv - Muzyka - #2, (pp. 24–25)
- 1975 - Banduryst Fedir Zharko - in NTE, #3
- 1978 - Kobzars'ka dialnist' I. I. Kuchenura-Kucherenko - NTE- #4 (p. 42-49)
- 1979 - Poklykannia - Muzyka, - #2 (p. 24)
- 1980 - Bandurist Mykola Opryshko - in NTE - #4
- 1980 - (with B. Kyrdan) - Narodni spivtsi-muzykanty na Ukraini - Kiev.
- 1989 - (with S. Bashtan) - Handbook for the bandura - Kiev.

== Students ==
Kost Novytsky, Volodymyr Kushpet

== Sources ==
- Zheplynskyi, Bohdan Mykhailovych - Kobzari Bandurysty - Lviv, 1999
- Necrolog published in NTE 1981 #4
