= Bobyr =

Bobyr is a surname. Notable people with the surname include:

- Andriy Matviyevych Bobyr (1915–1994), Ukrainian artist
- Nikolai Pavlovich Bobyr (1854–1920), Russian general
