= Lira (Ukrainian instrument) =

Ukrainian musical instrument

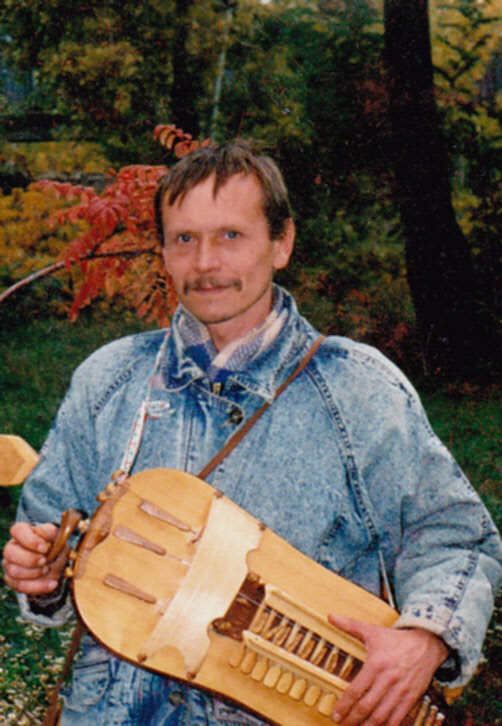
- Mykola Budnyk with lira circa 1995
- Classification: Chordophone
- Hornbostel–Sachs classification: 312.322-72

Related instruments
- Hurdy-gurdy; Relia

The lira (Ukrainian: ліра), or relia is a Ukrainian variant of the hurdy-gurdy, an instrument which can trace its history back to the 10th century. Regarding the origins of the lira in the region there are two schools of thought:

1. The lira is an evolution of the medieval bowed lira of the Byzantine Empire, ancestor of most European bowed instruments. The Byzantine lira was possibly introduced into Ukraine through the various trade routes to Byzantium.
2. The lira was introduced into Ukraine in the 17th century by Cossacks who had fought in France as mercenary soldiers.

The lira was used as an instrument to accompany religious psalms, kants and epic ballads (known as dumy) performed by itinerant blind musicians called lirnyky (sing. lirnyk). Occasionally lirnyky were hired to play dance music at weddings. They often organized themselves into guilds or brotherhoods with their own laws and a secret language known as Lebiy. The traditional lira has three strings, one on which the melody is played with the aid of a special keyboard, the other two producing a drone of a fifth. The sound is produced by a wooden wheel which is rotated by a crank held in the right hand. This wheel rubs against the strings, setting them into vibration like a bow on a violin.

A number of different types of chromatic liras have been produced in Ukraine. In recent times interest in the instrument has increased considerably.

Present day makers of the lira include Serhii Perekhozhuk, Serhii Pavlychenko (Hrytsko), and Yuriy Fedynsky.

The Austrian composer Joseph Haydn (1732–1809) wrote a set of five concertos (Hob.VIIH:1 – Hob. VIIH:5) featuring the instrument in 1786.

== See also ==
- Bandurist
- Hurdy-gurdy
- Kobzar
- Lirnyk
- Ukrainian folk music

== Sources ==
- Mizynec, Victor - Folk Instruments of Ukraine - (Bayda books, Australia 1987)
- Cherkaskyi, L. - Ukrainski narodni muzychni instrumenty // Tekhnika, Kyiv, Ukraine, 2003 - 262 pages. ISBN 966-575-111-5
- Margaret J. Kartomi - On Concepts and Classifications of Musical Instruments. Chicago Studies in Ethnomusicology, University of Chicago Press, 1990
