= Lirnyk =

Traditional Ukrainian Musicians

Safeguarding programme of kobza and wheel lyre tradition
- UNESCO Intangible Cultural Heritage
- Country: Ukraine
- Reference: 02136
- Region: Europe and North America

Inscription history
- Inscription: 2024 (19th session)
- List: Good Safeguarding

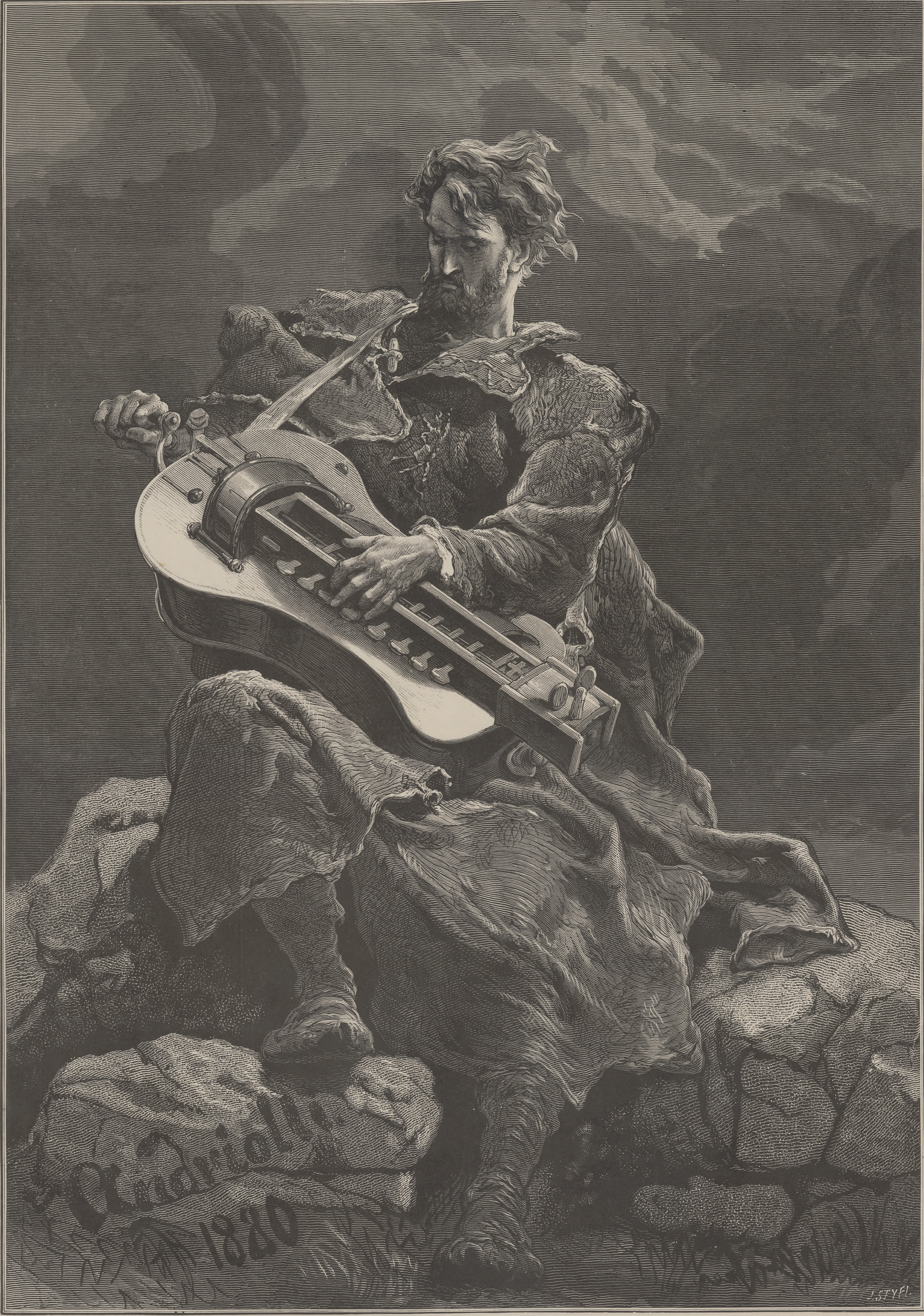
Lirnyk

The lirnyks (Ukrainian: лірник; plural: лірники – lirnyky) were itinerant Ukrainian musicians who performed religious, historical and epic songs to the accompaniment of a lira, the Ukrainian version of the hurdy-gurdy.

Lirnyks were similar to and belonged to the same guilds (tsekhs) as the better known bandura and kobza players known as kobzars. However, the lirnyk played the lira, a kind of crank-driven hurdy-gurdy, while the kobzars played the lute-like banduras or kobzas. Lirnyks were usually blind or had some major disability.

They were active in all areas of Ukraine from (at least) the 17th century on. Though the tradition was violently ended in Eastern/Central Ukraine in the mid-1930s, some lirnyks were seen in the regions of Western Ukraine until the 1970s and even the 1980s.

Today, the repertoire of the instrument is mostly performed by educated, sighted performers. Notable performers of the lira include Mykhailo Khai, Vadym "Yarema" Shevchuk, Volodymyr Kushpet and Andrii Liashuk.

In 2024, the Safeguarding programme of kobza and wheel lyre tradition was inscribed on the UNESCO Register of Good Safeguarding Practices.

== Gallery ==
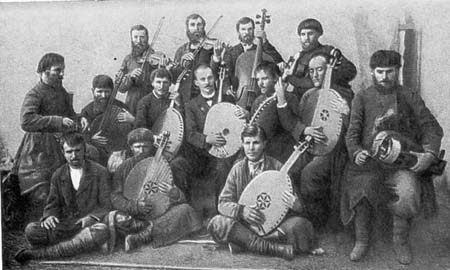
Ukrainian lirnyk with kobzars, Kharkiv, 1902

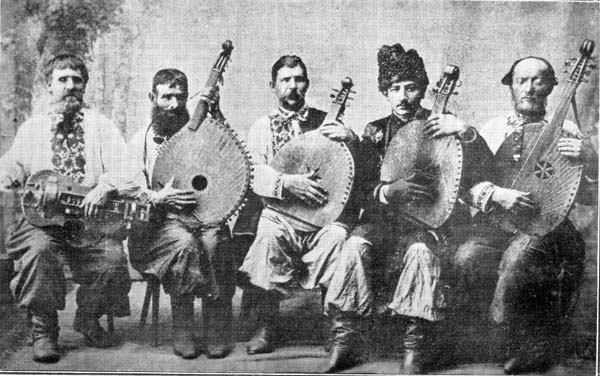
Ukrainian lirnyk with kobzars, Okhtyrka, 1911

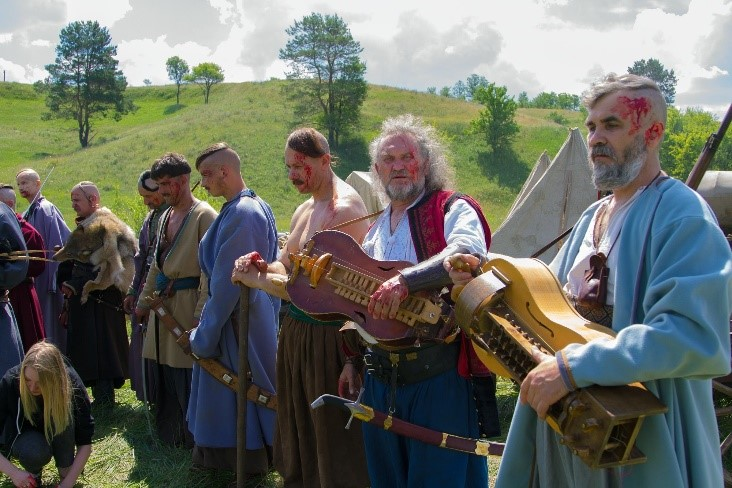
Modern-day lirnyks in Ukraine

== See also ==
- Kobzar
- Persecuted kobzars and bandurists
- Dziady (wandering beggars)
- Kobzarstvo
- Bandurist
- Blind musicians

== Sources ==
- Humeniuk, A. - Ukrainski narodni muzychni instrumenty - Kiev: Naukova dumka, 1967
- Mizynec, V. - Ukrainian Folk Instruments - Melbourne: Bayda books, 1984
