= Kobza (surname) =

Kobza is a metonymic occupational surname of Polish, Czech, Slovak, Ukrainian and Hungarian origin, referring to a player of the kobza, a type of lute. Notable people with the surname include:

- Eryk Kobza (born 2001), Canadian soccer player
- Jerry Kobza (born 1969), American racing driver
- Jiří Kobza (born 1955), Czech politician, civil servant, businessman and diplomatic attaché
