= Kobzarstvo =

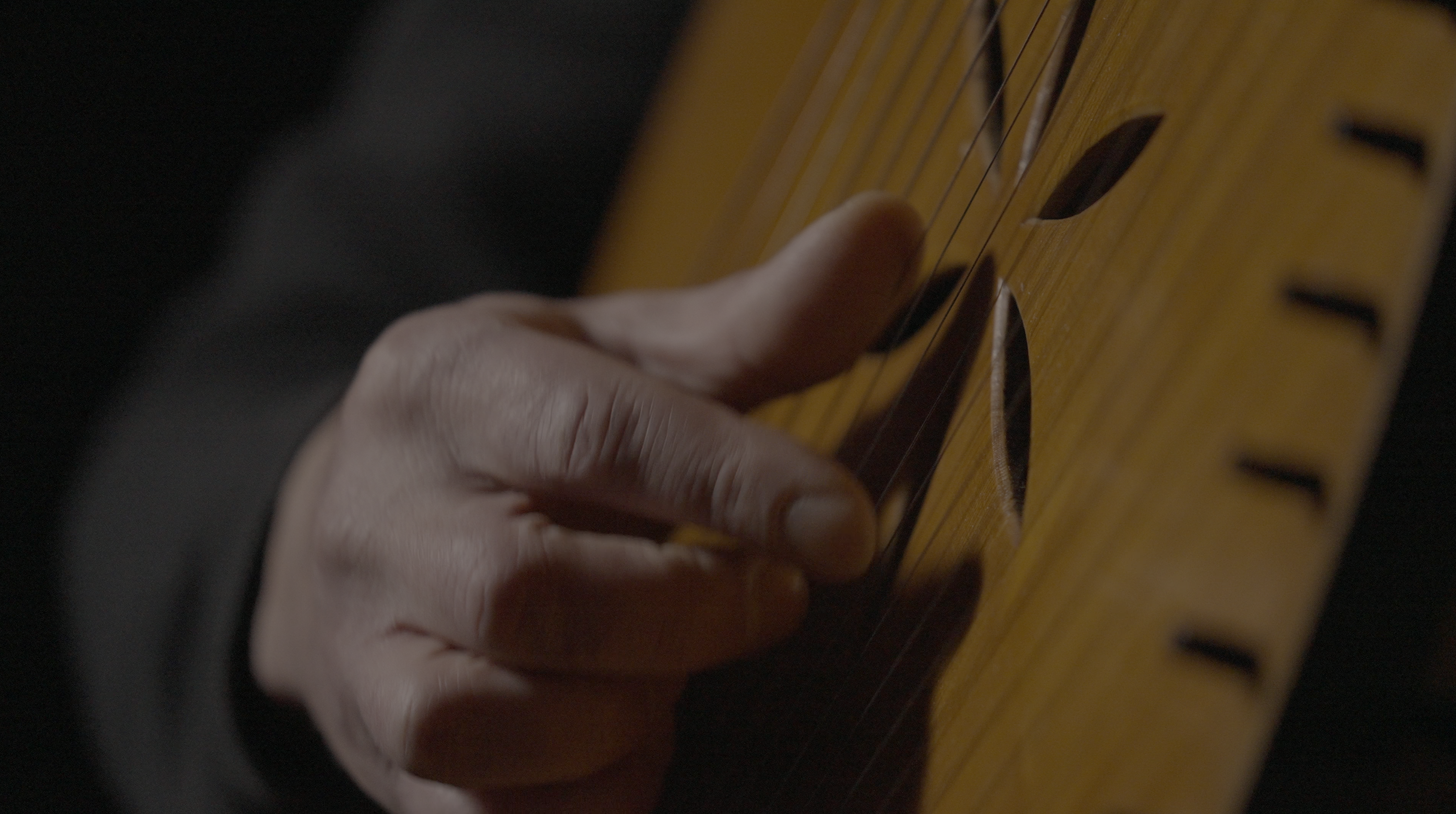
Kobza

Kobzarstvo (Ukrainian: Кобзарство) in the wider definition, is the art and related culture of singing to the accompaniment of the Ukrainian plucked string instruments bandura and kobza, as well as the Ukrainian hurdy-gurdy, which is called lira.

More specifically, it deals with the related culture of the blind professional itinerant folk singers, known as the kobzars and the lirnyks. It includes their musical genres, style of performing, playing techniques, customs, secret language (known as Lebiy), organization and para-religious traditions.

The study of kobzarstvo initially started in the mid-18th century and continues to this day.

The wider definition, although not accurate, it can also include the culture of the more modern non-blind conservatory trained musicians and bandura ensembles - both amateur and professional.

== See also ==
- Preservation of kobzar music
