= Kobzarskyi Tsekh =

Organization of Ukrainian bards

Kobzarskyi Tsekh (Ukrainian: Кобзарський Цех, Kobzars'kyi Tsekh), literally "Kobzar guild", is an organization of kobzars, which have existed since the 17th century in Ukraine.

In Ukraine, blind travelling musicians, known as kobzars or lirnyks, organized themselves into guilds similarly to professional craftsmen. These musicians would gather at regular meeting spots on particular dates to celebrate religious feasts, administer examinations for the induction of novices and masters, and collect money for placement of votive candles under icons of patron saints and to also discuss the business of the guild. If necessary, the elected leader (pan otets) would call additional meetings. To become a member one had to have a physical handicap, to study kobza playing with a master (usually for at least two years), to obtain permission (vyzvilka) to perform independently, to know the kobzars' Lebiy language, and to pay dues regularly.

A member who had violated a brotherhood's moral code was tried by a brotherhood's court. The severest punishment was ostracism. Lesser transgressors were whipped or fined. A member who chose to marry received a dowry from the brotherhood's treasury and was thereafter addressed in the polite second person plural by other members. If members caught a kobzar performing who had not received a vyzvilka, they destroyed his instrument, and he was fined and even beaten. The brotherhoods propagated the idea that kobzars were not beggars but professional artists, and instilled a sense of pride among their members; e.g., in asking or waiting for a reward, a member was forbidden to fall to his knees.

From 1932 until the collapse of the Soviet Union in 1991, kobzars were effectively outlawed, and many were put to death.

After Ukraine regained independence from Russia, the idea for the creation of a Kobzar guild in Kyiv was initiated by followers and students of traditional bandurist Heorhy Tkachenko - Mykola Budnyk and Mykhailo Khai. The reason for the formation of the Kobzar guild was to have a formal organization to resurrect and reestablish forgotten traditions and to help deal with the needs of those bandurists who were interested in performing traditional music of the kobzars. The established regulated government institutions of the time were openly hostile to this group of bandurists, and as a result the Kyiv Kobzar guild was formed initially in opposition to the various formal music schools and conservatoria, as these structures had agendas which did not support authentic performance practice of traditional folk music.

The Kobzar Guild has grown into a significant movement and force in contemporary Ukrainian musical life. There are over 200 members and associates, with chapters in Kyiv, Kharkiv, Poltava and Lviv.

== "Kobzarska Triicia" Festival ==
The Kobzar Guild began festival life in 2008. The "Kobzarska Triicia" (Kobzar Trinity) festival became regular. The festival's program consist of concerts, press-conferences, scientific conferences, exhibitions of traditional epic instruments and traditional dance-parties.

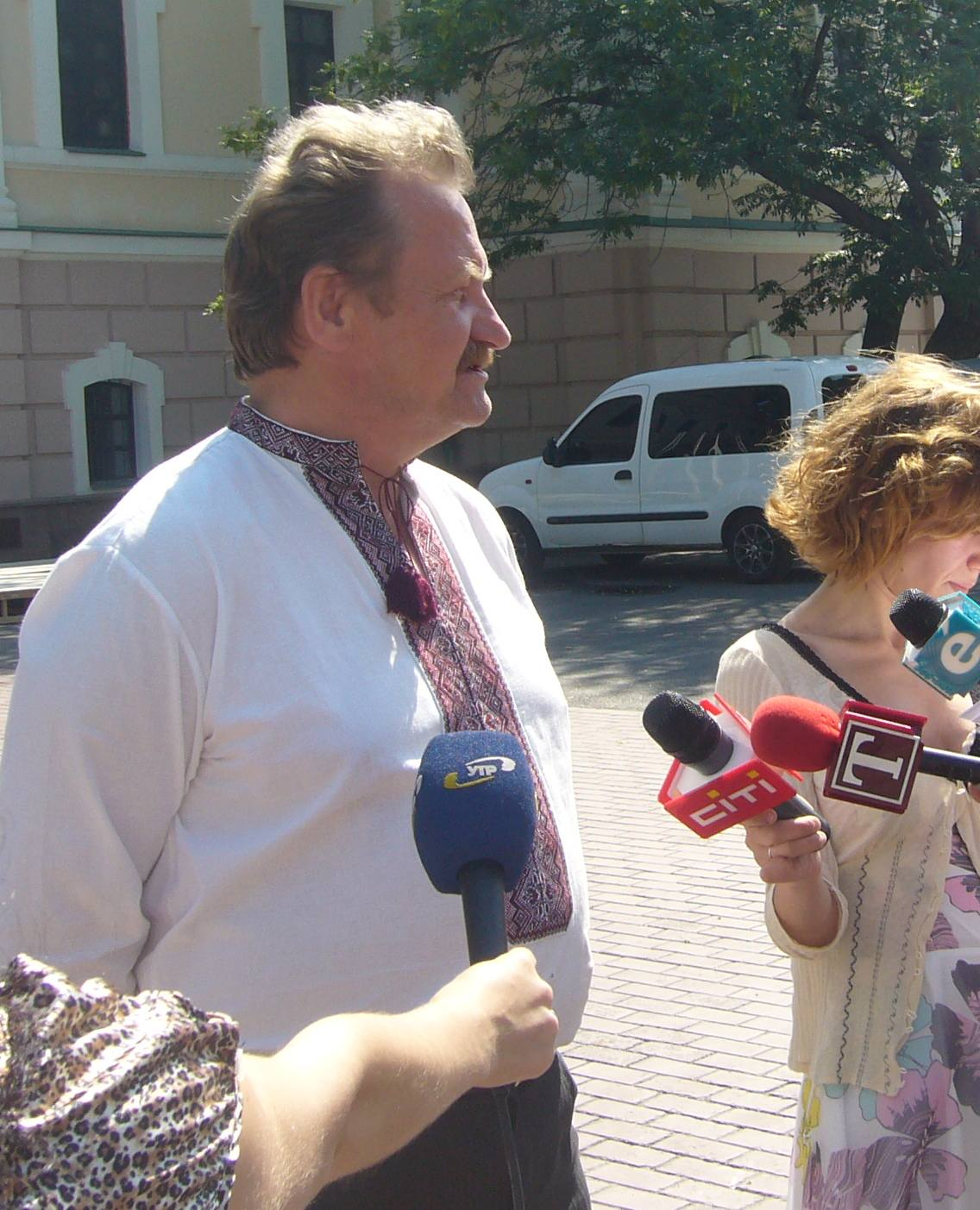
Mr. M. Tovkailo, Head of Kyiv kobzar Guild opens the first Festival of Ukrainian epic genre "Kobzarska Triicia" (Kobzar Trinity)

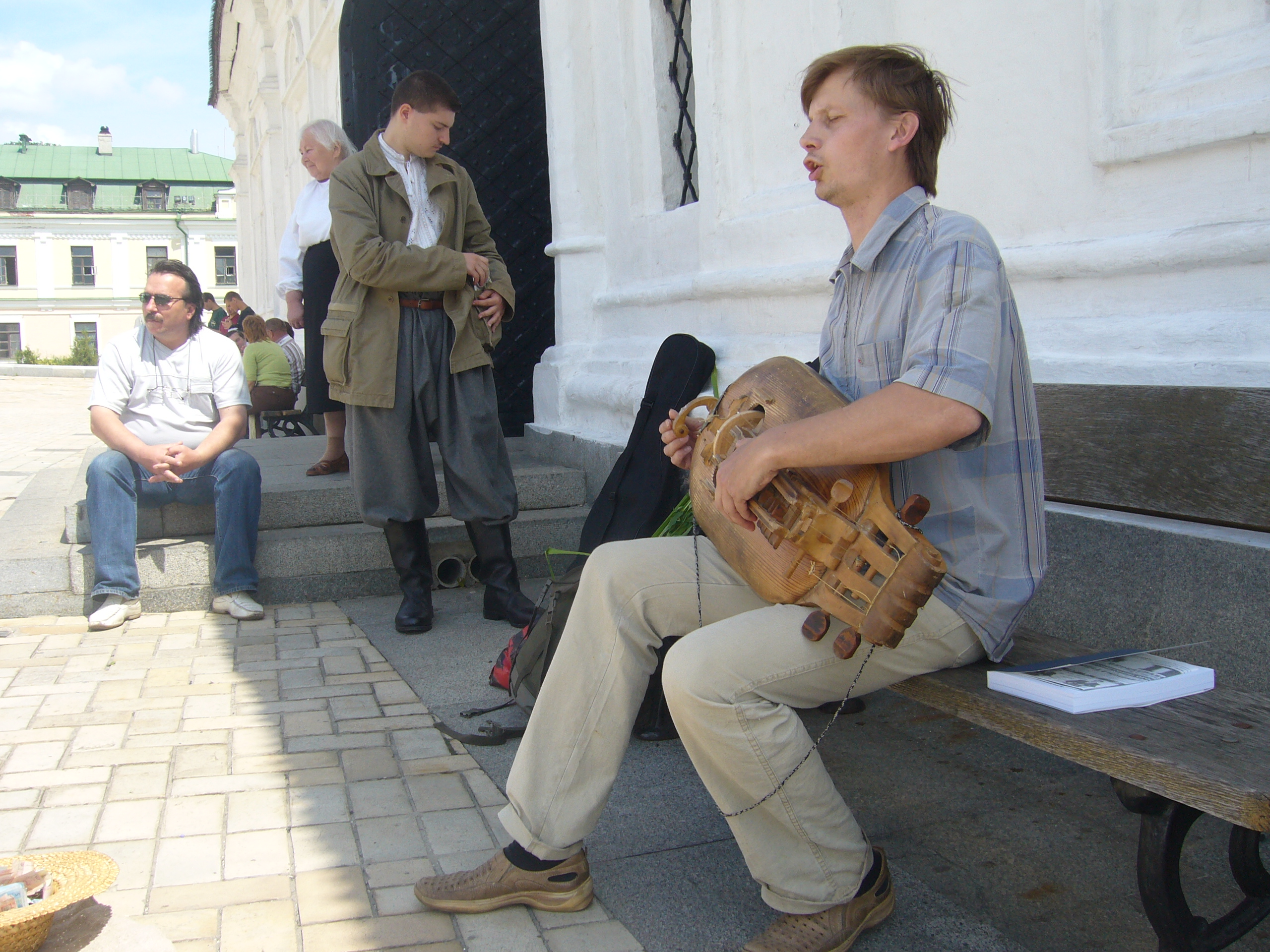
Lirnyk (hardy-gardy player) Yarema, "Kobzarska Triicia" (Kobzar Trinity) 2008

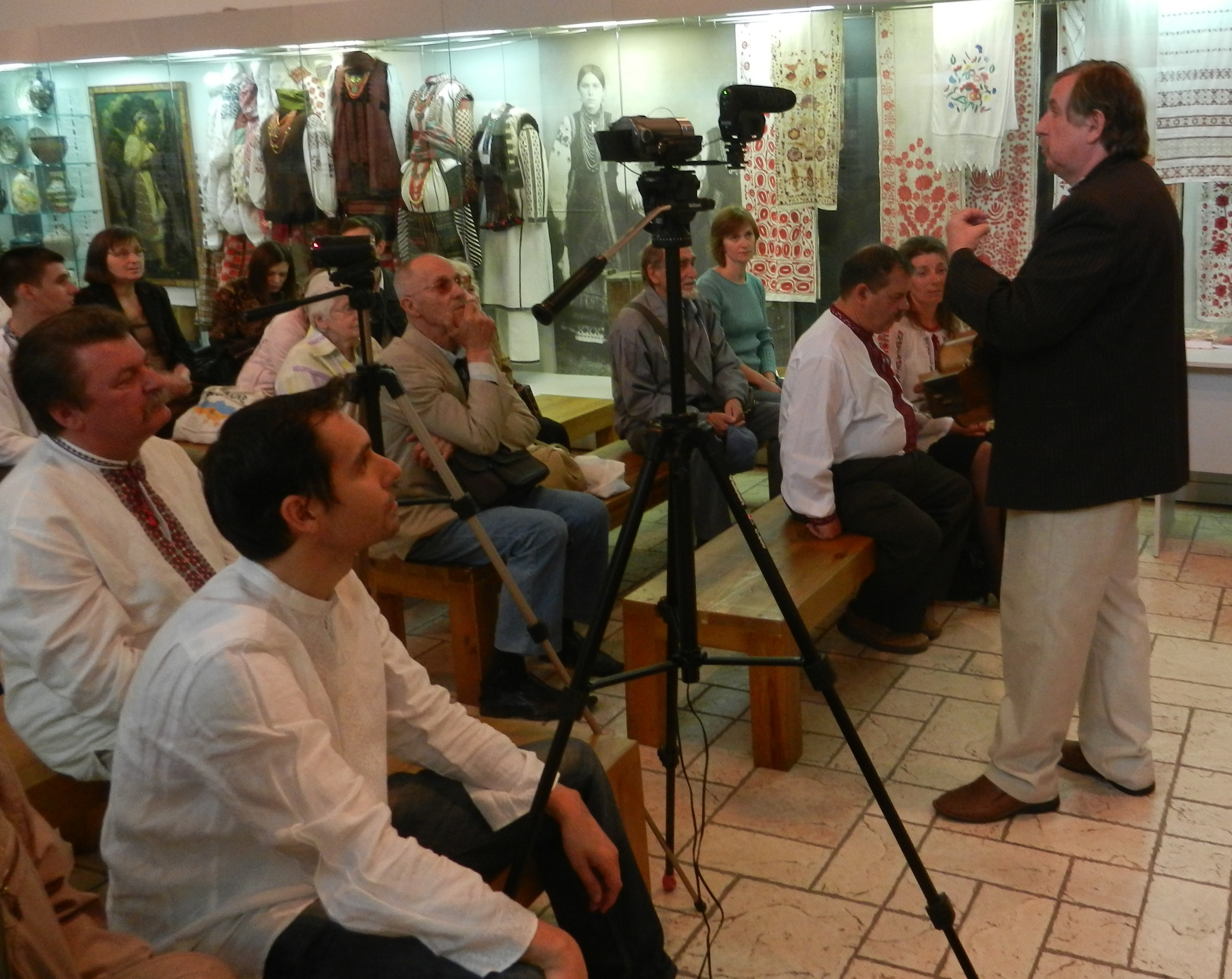
Mr. M.Khai opens Scientific Conference devoted to the Fifth Festival of Ukrainian epic genre "Kobzarska Triicia" (Kobzar Trinity), 2012

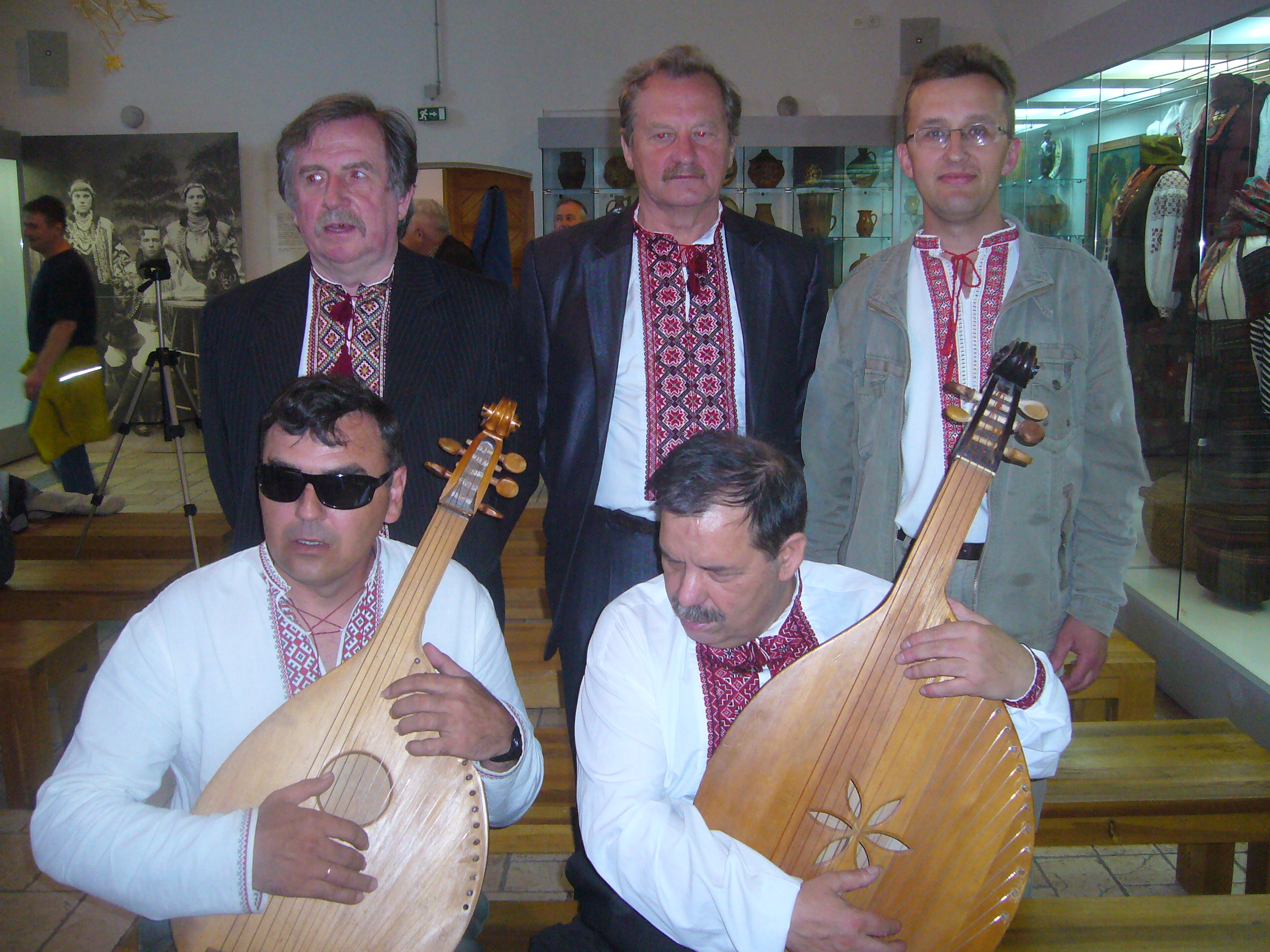
Heads of three Kobzar Guild (upper row) - Lviv (M.Khai), Kyiv (M. Tovkailo) and Kharkiv (K. Cheremsky) with first blind singers of new generation Oleksandr Trius and Laiosh Molnar (lower row)

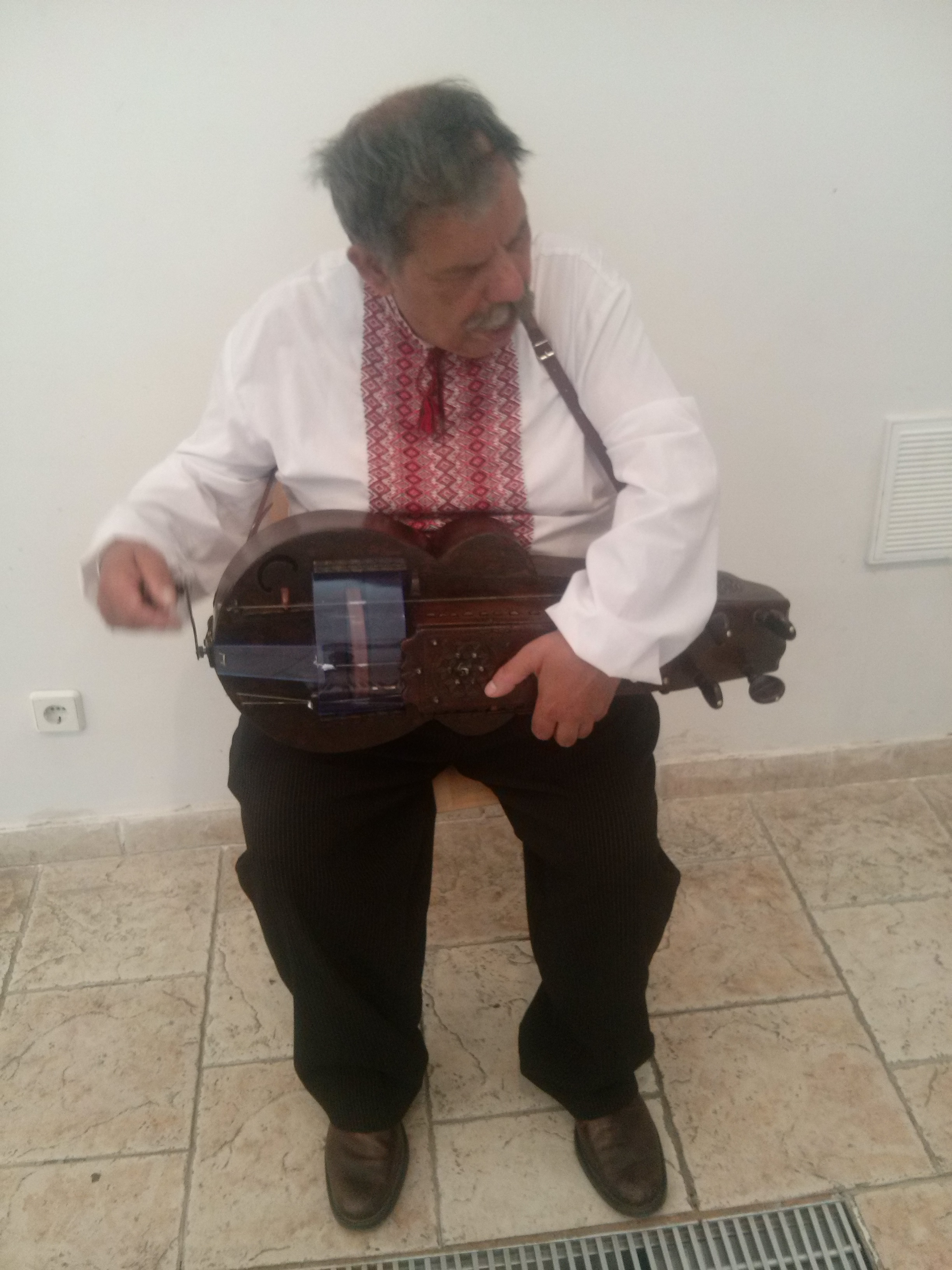
Blind Ukrainian singer and Hurdy-gurdy-player Laiosh Molnar plays old german hurdy-gurdy (17th century) restored by famous German musician and reconstructor Kurt Reichmann, foreign guest of "Kobzarska Triicia" Festival, 2017

== See also ==
- Kobzar guilds
- Taras Kompanichenko
- Eduard Drach
- Volodymyr Kushpet

== Sources ==
- Diakowsky, M. J. - The Bandura. The Ukrainian Trend, 1958, №I, - С.18-36
- Haydamaka, L. – Kobza-bandura – National Ukrainian Musical Instrument. "Guitar Review" №33, Summer 1970 (С.13-18)
- Mishalow, V. - A Brief Description of the Zinkiv Method of Bandura Playing. Bandura, 1982, №2/6, - С.23-26
- Mishalow, V. - A Short History of the Bandura. East European Meetings in Ethnomusicology 1999, Romanian Society for Ethnomusicology, Volume 6, - С.69-86
- Mizynec, V. - Folk Instruments of Ukraine. Bayda Books, Melbourne, Australia, 1987 - 48с.
- Cherkaskyi, L. - Ukrainski narodni muzychni instrumenty. Tekhnika, Kyiv, Ukraine, 2003 - 262 pages. ISBN 966-575-111-5
- Мішалов, В. і М. Українські кобзарі-бандуристи – Сідней, Австралія, 1986 - 106с.
- Самчук, У. - Живі струни - Детройт, США, 1976 (468с.)
