= Kost Novytsky =

Ukrainian bandurist

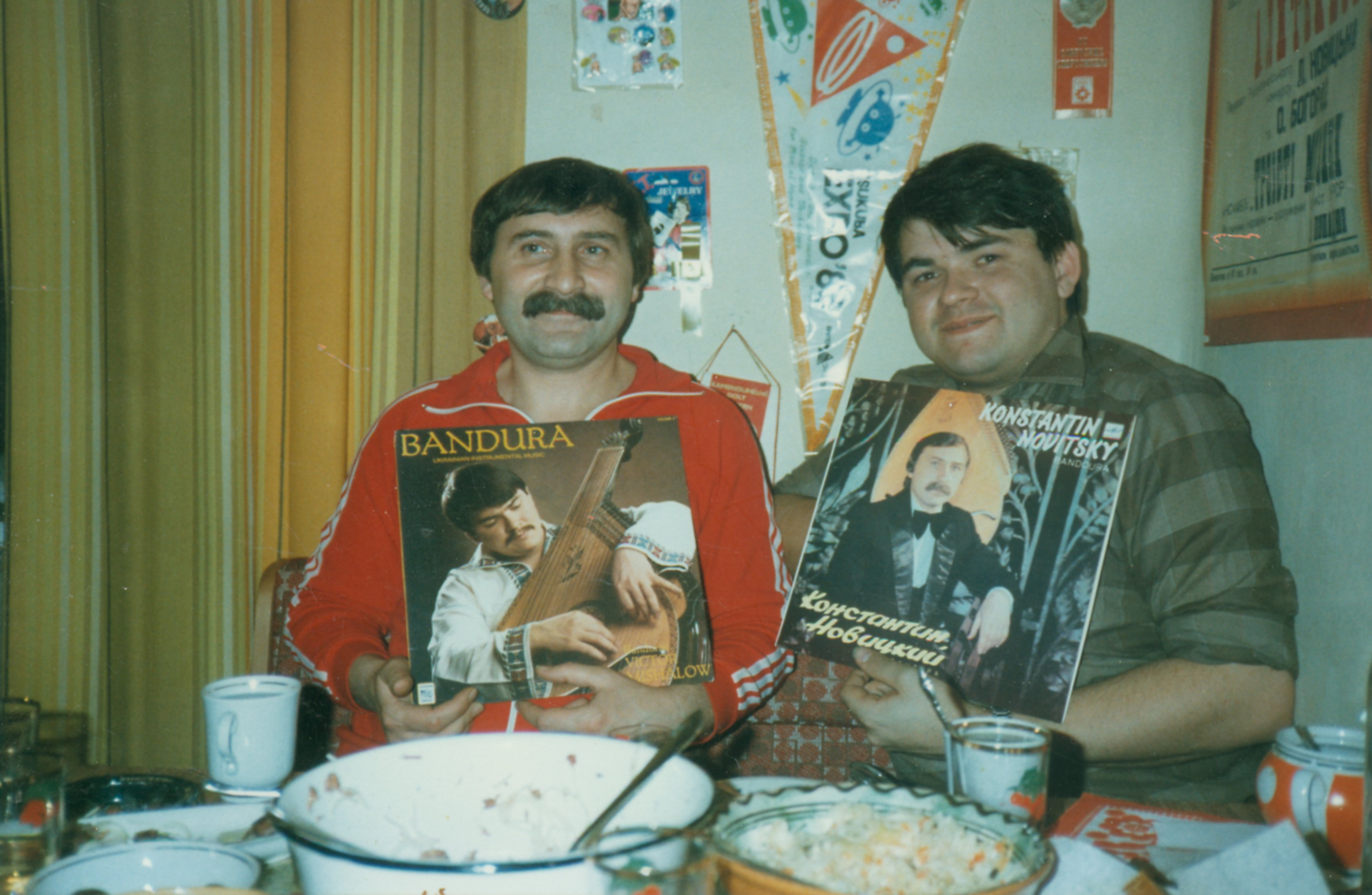
Novytsky and Victor Mishalow

Kostantyn Heorhiovych Novytsky, better known as Kost' Novytsky (Ukrainian: Костянтин Георгійович Новицький) (December 26, 1950 in Kyiv, Ukrainian SSR (Now Ukraine)) is a Merited Artist of Ukraine and one of the more influential bandurists in Kyiv today.

== Biography ==
Originally, he studied under Andriy Omelchenko and later at the Kyiv Conservatory under Serhiy Bashtan. After completing his studies, he was one of the founders of the pop group Kobza (Ukrainian: Кобза) and was one of its soloists. Later, he formed a duo with fellow bandurist Volodymyr Kushpet. In 1985, Kost' Novytsky recorded a solo record of instrumental bandura music on the Melodiya label. In the late 1980s, Novytsky worked as an instrumental soloist with the Kyiv Bandurist Capella.

Currently he teaches bandura at the Kyiv Conservatory.
