= Nicholas Dáll Pierce =

Nicholas Dáll Pierce ("blind Nicholas Pierce") (c.1561 – 1653) was an Irish harp player and composer.

Pierce resided at Rattoo, Clanmaurice, County Kerry, and was a renowned blind harp player. According to Captain Francis O'Neill, on 11 April 1601 he was

"Celebrated for his capacity for composing laments, and other ancient strains, he enjoyed the distinction, O'Curry tells us of having three odes written in his praise. It appears that he fell into disfavour with the government for it is recorded in the State Papers that Nicholas Dall, Rattoo, County Kerry, was pardoned with nine others in 1601 by Queen Elizabeth and her Lord Deputies in Ireland."

"Pierce's renown both as a harper and as a composer of laments and other tunes is reflected in three odes written in his honour."

== Bibliography ==
- John H. Pierse: "Nicholas Dall Pierce of Co. Kerry, Harper", in: Journal of the Kerry Archaeological and Historical Society 6 (1973), p. 40-75
