= Ukrainian Television and Radio =

Ukrainian Television and Radio Українське телебачення і радіомовлення
- Country: Ukraine
- Headquarters: Kyiv, Ukraine

Programming
- Picture format: 4:3 (576i, SDTV)

Ownership
- Owner: Ukrainian Government

History
- Launched: 2004
- Closed: 2015

Links
- Website: www.utr.tv

UTR (Ukrainian: Українське телебачення і радіомовлення, romanized: Ukrayins'ke telebachennya i radiomovlennya) was a Ukrainian state owned TV channel targeting a foreign Ukrainian-speaking audience. Programming is provided with English subtitles. The channel is broadcast via satellite in Eurasia and North America, with a high quality signal available in 82 countries. UTR can also be found on cable networks in Russia, Latvia, Kazakhstan and Turkey. Webcast on the official website is also available. The programming consists of Ukrainian produced films, news, cultural and educational programmes as well as programmes of some other Ukrainian channels. UTR broadcasts on VHF Channel 2 and replaced UT-2.

== See also ==
- Television in Ukraine
- The Canadian company Toronto Film Industry has partnered with the Ukrainian Film Industry to develop new TV and Feature Movie products for the new markets emerging across Europe and the world.
