= Paul Konoplenko-Zaporozhetz =

Paul Konoplenko-Zaporozhetz Павло Конопленко-Запорожець
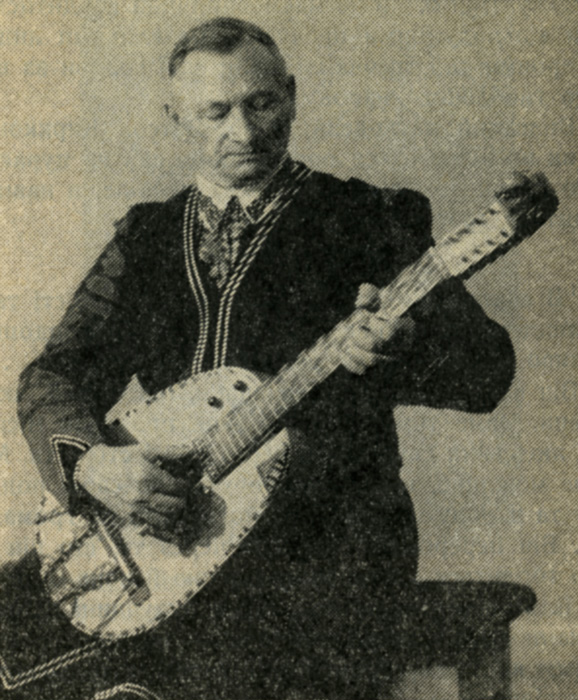

Background information
- Born: 1890; Kherson Province, Russian Empire (present-day Ukraine)
- Died: 1982 (aged 91–92) Winnipeg, Canada
- Genres: Folk
- Occupation(s): Author, kobzar
- Instrument: Bandura

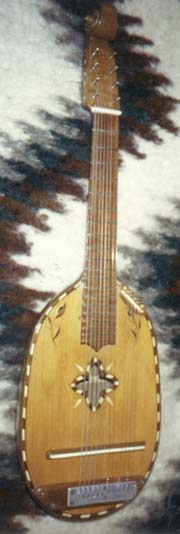
The kobza used by Konoplenko-Zaporozhetz.

Paul Stepanovych Konoplenko-Zaprozhetz (Note: Ukrainian: Павло Степанович Конопленко-Запорожець, romanized: Pavlo Stepanovych Konoplenko-Zaporozhets) (1890 – 1982) was a Ukrainian Canadian author and kobza player.

Konoplenko was born in Kherson Province and originally obtained his kobza from bandurist Danylo Potapenko in Kyiv in 1902. At that time the instrument was 50 years old.

Konoplenko had studied violin under professor Karbulka and guitar in Odessa under an Italian teacher Spetsi. He joined the Sich Riflemen and retreated with Ukrainian forces to Poland. He continued to perform throughout Europe in the mid war years. After World War II he emigrated to Canada, settling in Winnipeg where he continued to perform kobzar repertoire on his kobza.

In 1961 Paul Konoplenko-Zaporozhetz recorded a disc of kobza music for the Folkways label, which is available from the Smithsonian website

Konoplenko's instrument had eight strings strung along the neck and four treble strings strung on the soundboard. The tuning used was reminiscent to that of the seven-string Russian guitar tuning (open G tuning).

Konoplenko was the author of a number of books about the history of the bandura, koza and kobzars published in Canada including:

- Кобза і бандура ("The Kobza and Bandura"), Winnipeg, 1963.
- Kobzar, Winnipeg, 1978.

In 1980 he was awarded the Shevchenko Medal by the Ukrainian Canadian Congress. He died in 1982 in Winnipeg, Canada.

== Sources ==
- Kudrytsky, A. V. - Mystetsvo Ukrainy - Biohrafichnyj dovidnyk - Kiev 1997
- Ukrainians in North America, USA
- Литвин, М. – Струни золотії – “Веселка”, К.:1994 (117с.)
- Мішалов, В. і М. Українські кобзарі-бандуристи – Сідней, Австралія, 1986 - 106с.
- Самчук, У. - Живі струни - Детройт, США, 1976 (468с.)
