= Kobza (band) =

Ukrainian vocal and instrumental ensemble

Kobza is a vocal and instrumental ensemble of Ukraine from the 1970s and 1980s. VIA "Kobza" was the first of the bands of the former Soviet Union to go on a commercial tour on the American continent (1982). The original band leader was Oleksandr Zuev. One of the songwriters and current bandleader is Yevhen Kovalenko.

== History ==
=== 1971–1985 ===
Vocal and instrumental ensemble "Kobza" began its professional creative activity in 1971 as part of "Ukrconcert."

In 1971, the ensemble was invited to take part, as an accompanying ensemble, in the recording of the record by singer Valentina Kuprina at the Kyiv studio of the All-Union record company "Melodiya." At the same time, the management of the studio liked Kobza's own material, and a decision was made to record the ensemble's solo album. Vocalist Valery Viter, a student of the Kyiv Art Institute and a former soloist of the amateur ensemble "Berezenʹ," was invited especially for this purpose.

The record was based on arrangements of Ukrainian folk songs and compositions by the ensemble's leader Oleksandr Zuev. Instead of the usual guitars, the ensemble used traditional folk instruments - banduras in their electronic production that sounded like electric guitars. Volodymyr Ivasyuk's world-famous song "Vodogray" performed by VIA "Kobza" and singer Valentina Kuprina ("Melodiya") was recorded on this record for the first time. The recording was attended by: Oleksandr Zuev (keyboards), Konstantin Novitsky, Volodymyr Kushpet (bandura players), Alexander Rogoza (bass guitar), George Garbar (flute), Valery Viter (vocals) and Anatoly Lyutyuk (drums).

In 1973, Kobza shared third place with the Muscovites at the All-Union Competition of Vocal and Instrumental Ensembles in Minsk. First place was won by the "Pesniary," the second was not awarded to anyone. Since then, Kobza has become one of the largest concert groups in the Soviet Union.

In 1974, Oleksandr Zuev left the ensemble and soon headed the VIA Cherkasy Philharmonic "Kalyna."

Then "Kobza" was led by musicians of the ensemble - bass guitarist and singer Oleg Lednev and bandura player Konstantin Novitsky. From 1977, Yevhen Kovalenko, a graduate of the Rostov Conservatory, keyboardist and vocalist, who had previously written for the ensemble arranging and processing folk songs, took the place of first musical and later artistic director.

In 1978, another giant record, "Kobza", was released, which was recorded by K. Novitsky, V. Viter, V. Kushpet, G. Garbar, as well as musicians who replaced the first lineup - Oleg Lednev (bass guitar, vocals), Yevhen Kovalenko (keyboards, vocals), Mykola Berehovy (violin, vocals) Gennady Tatarchenko (guitar, vocals) and Vasyl Kolektsionov (drums, vocals). The program consisted of arrangements of Ukrainian folk songs and songs by Ukrainian composers.

- Giant disk "KOBZA". Vocal and instrumental ensemble. ("Melodiya") 33С60-10941-42 - 1977

Since then, the band has had from 200 to 300 concerts in all parts of the USSR. The ensemble also tours abroad: Czechoslovakia (1977, 1979, 1983), Italy (1977), Mongolia (1979), Cuba (1980), Finland (1981), Germany (1981, 1984), Canada (1982), Yemen (1983), Poland (1985), and Japan (1985).

In 1980 the ensemble was awarded the Mykola Ostrovsky Republican Komsomol Prize.

In 1982 VIA Kobza prepared a concert program "Kyiv Frescoes" dedicated to the 1500th anniversary of Kyiv with original music and poetry with the participation of ballet and the use of special stage costumes (composer Vitaly Filipenko, director Irina Molostova, choreographer Boris Kamenkovich).

In 1982, during a tour of Canada with the host country "National Concert Agency," the vinyl giant record "KOBZA" was released.

The composition of "Kobza" changed periodically. Yes, K. Novitsky left it because of his "nevyyiznist." O. Lednev left the ensemble to form a family duo "Two Colors" with the singer Lyudmila Grimalskaya (the first performer of the popular hit Vadim Ilyin "Music Lessons"). One graduated from the conservatory and became a professional composer G. Tatarchenko. Family worries dragged home drummer V. Kolektsionov. A little earlier, bandura player V. Kushpet left the ensemble and later created the "School of Kobzar Art" in Kyiv region. Three bright musicians came to the ensemble: bass guitarist V. Soldatenko, drummer E. Trinko, and a little later - guitarist P. Kovalenko.

In 1982, the artistic director of VIA "Kobza" Yevhen Kovalenko, one of the first Ukrainian pop artists, was awarded the title of "Honored Artist of the USSR."

=== 1985–2011 ===
VIA "Kobza" and the Yavir Quartet were among the first artists of the Ukrconcert in the Chornobyl zone. VIA "Kobza" finished its trips to the "zone" in 1992, when doctors forbade them to go there for health reasons. Currently, VIA Kobza artists have certificates as liquidators of the Chornobyl accident and awards from the state.

In 1987, Valery Viter, who was one of the best and most successful artists, left the band. Other musicians also left the band.

Artistic director Yevhen Kovalenko gathered musicians who had played in Kobza, some time after 1980, and found refuge in "Ukrkoncert," and later in "Kyivconcert."

The band continued to tour: the GDR (1986), Denmark (1989), the Netherlands (1990), Germany (1992, 1998), France (1993, 1994, 1997), Poland (1993, 1994, 1996), Egypt (1994), and Great Britain (1995). At that time the ensemble included: bandurist - S. Zhovnirovich, violinist - I. Tkachuk, performer on 30 musical instruments - M. Bloshchychak, guitarist-kobzar - P. Kovalenko, bass guitar - V. Soldatenko, drummer & percussionist - K. Kurko, lead soloist - M. Pravdyvyi, keyboards & accordion - the leader of the team - Yevhen Kovalenko.

In 1997 artistic director of VIA "Kobza" Yevhen Kovalenko was awarded the title "People's Artist of Ukraine."

In 1998 soloists of VIA "Kobza" Petro Kovalenko and Mykola Pravdyvyi were both awarded the title "Honored Artist of Ukraine."

In 2002 artist of VIA "Kobza" Volodymyr Soldatenko was awarded the title "Honored Artist of Ukraine."

VIA "Kobza" headed by the artistic director of the People's Artist of Ukraine Yevhen Kovalenko, with musicians - Honored Artists of Ukraine: M. Pravdyvy, V. Soldatenko, P. Kovalenko and O. Murenko conducts active creative touring and concert activities and is one of the authoritative ensembles in the creative territories of Ukraine and the entire former Soviet Union.

== Awards ==
- Laureate of the International Festival "Yurmala-85" Yurmala, Latvia, 1985
- Laureate of the International Festival "Palanga-85" Palanga, Lithuania, 1985
- Laureate of the festival "Vohni mahistrali" - Khabarovsk - 1988
- Laureate of the International Festival "Midtfynns Festival" - Odense, Denmark - 1989
- Laureate of the International Festival "Art Parade" - Osaka, Japan, 2002
- Festival laureate "Hit of the Year" - 2002–2006, Kyiv
- Festival laureate "Our Song" - 2003-2005, Kyiv
- Laureate of the TV festival "Song Premiere - 2010" in Bucha

== See also ==
- Pop music in Ukraine
- Music of Ukraine
