= Taras Kompanichenko =

Taras Kompanichenko Тарас Компаніченко Shevchenko National Prize laureate
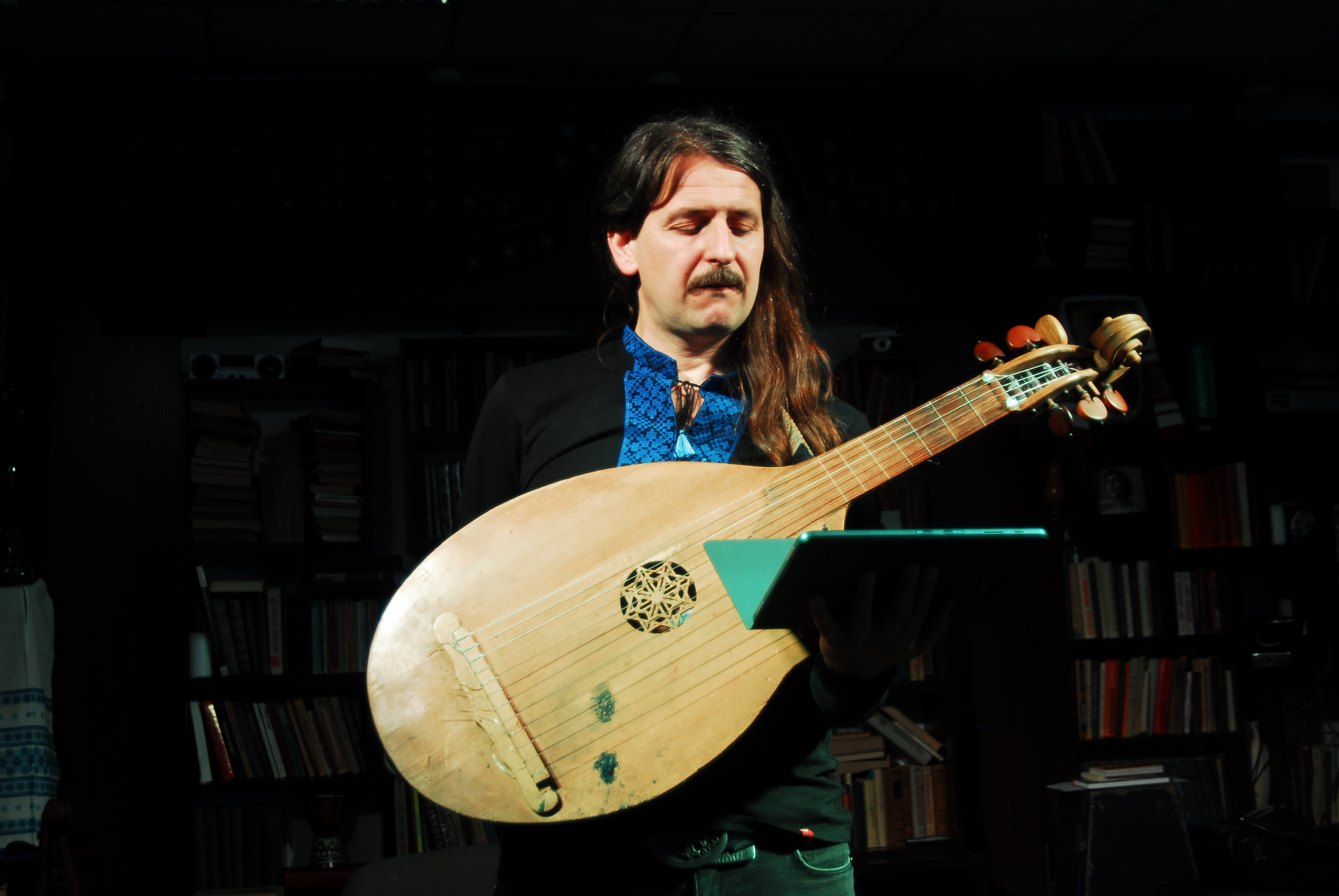
- Kompanichenko in 2018

Background information
- Born: November 14, 1969 (age 56); Kyiv, Ukrainian SSR, Soviet Union
- Genres: Folk
- Occupations: Kobzar, bandurist, lirnyk, composer, singer-songwriter
- Instrument: Bandura

Taras Viktorovych Kompanichenko (Ukrainian: Тарас Вікторович Компаніченко; born 14 November 1969) is a Ukrainian recording artist, kobzar, bandurist, lirnyk, composer, and singer-songwriter.

Kompanichenko is an active member of the Kobzarskyi Tsekh (lit. 'Kobzar guild'), as well as of the Early Music ensembles "Chorea Kozacka" and "Sarmatica". He was an active participant in the Orange Revolution, that took place in Ukraine from November 2004 to January 2005, as well as Euromaidan from 2013 to 2014. He is a Merited Artist of Ukraine and a laureate of the Vasyl Stus Prize.

Born in Kyiv and originally trained as a painter and an art historian, he gave up this profession in favor of music. In the wake of Russia launching a full-scale invasion of Ukraine, he took up arms and joined the 241st Territorial Defense Brigade.

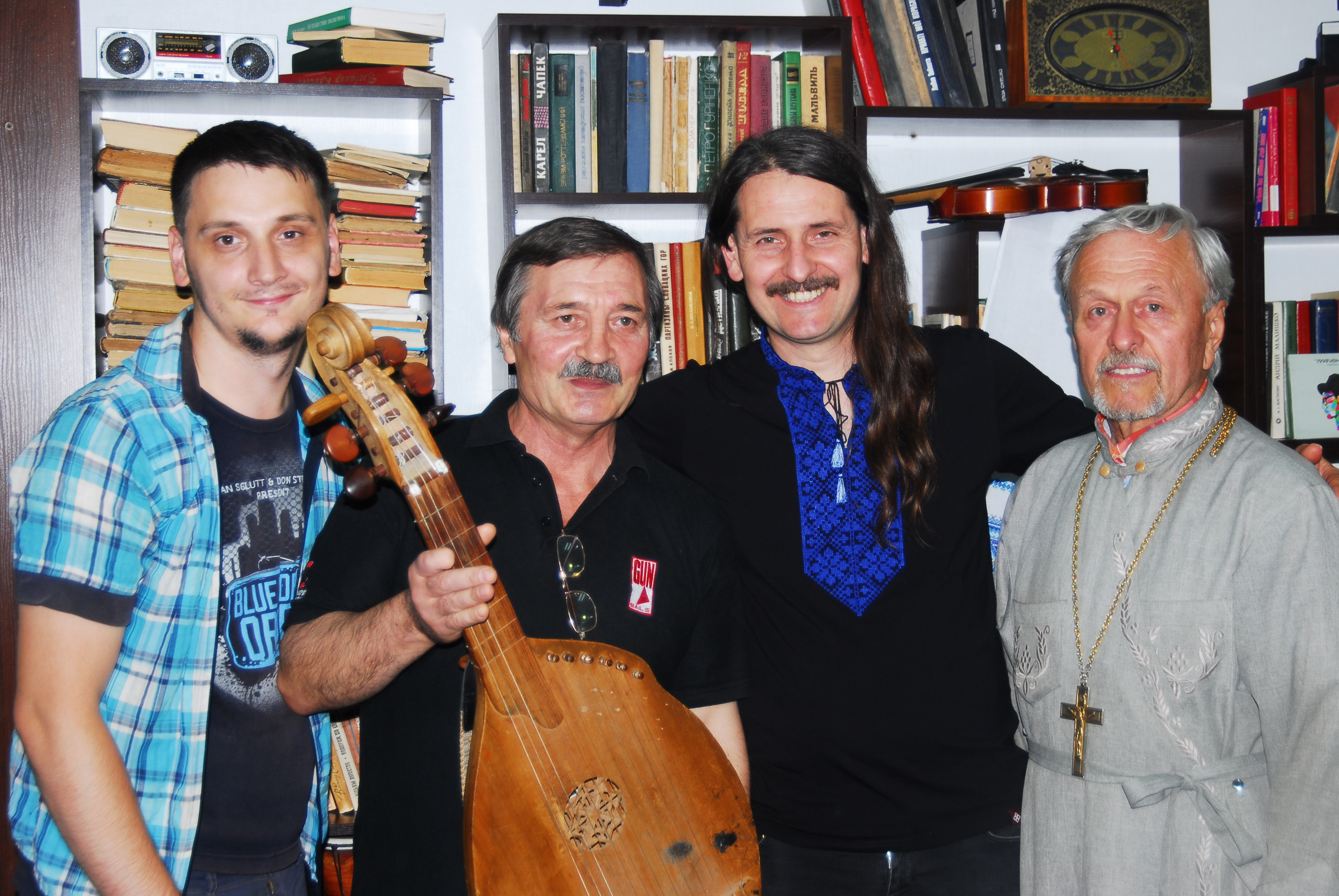
Kompanichenko (second from right) in Melitopol in 2018
