= Serhiy Bashtan =

Ukrainian bandura professor (1927–2017)

- Сергій Баштан
- Born: January 12, 1927; Novi Birochky, Ukrainian SSR, Soviet Union (now Velykyj Khutir, Ukraine
- Died: January 10, 2017 (aged 89)
- Occupation: Bandurist

Serhiy Vasylievych Bashtan (Note: Ukrainian: Сергій Васильович Баштан, romanized: Serhii Vasylovych Bashtan) (12 January 1927 – 10 January 2017) was a professor of bandura at the Kiev Conservatory.

Bashtan was born in the village of Novi Birochky, now Velykyj Khutir, Cherkasy Oblast. (Other sources state that he was born in the village of Mykhailivka, Drabivsky region). He studied music at the Gliere Music College in 1948 under Volodymyr Kabachok and continued his studies in bandura at the Kiev Conservatory under V. Kabachok and M. Helis in 1959.

In 1957 he won the gold medals at the All-Union Festival of Youth and Students in Moscow and also at the 6th World Festival of Youth and Students. He became an instrumental soloist of the Veriovka Ukrainian Folk Choir from 1959 to 1968.

In 1967 received the title of Merited Artist of the Ukrainian SSR and from 1968 he has taught bandura at the Kiev Conservatory. In 1980 he received the title of Professor, and was the first bandurist to receive this title. In 1995 he received the title of People's Artist of Ukraine.

During the time he was in the Ukrainian National Folk Choir he became the partorg i.e., the leader of the Soviet Communist Party division at the Choir. He also took this position in the Kiev Conservatory.

Serhiy Bashtan is the longtime professor of bandura at the Kiev Conservatory. His major contributions lie in developing a professional repertoire for the bandura by commissioning works by prominent Ukrainian composers such as K. Miaskov, A. Kolomiyetz, M. Dremliuha, F. Nadanenko, H. Hembera. and others. These works were published in music collections which he edited from 1960 to 1991. Bashtan has also composed over 30 instrumental works for the bandura. He has been the editor of a number of compilations.

== Publications ==
- Biblioteka Bandurysta (1960–67)
- Vziav by ya Banduru (1968–1975)
- Repertuar Bandurysta (1976-)
- Shkola hry na Banduri / Handbook for the Bandura (with A. Omelchenko) (1984, reprinted 1989)

== Students ==
Volodymyr Yesypok, Petro Chukhrai, Victor Mishalow, Alla Sheptytska, Maya Holenko, T. Hrytsenko, S. Petrova, Volodymyr Kushpet, Kost Novytsky, Roman Hrynkiv, Liudmyla Hlotova, Lidiya Olijnyjk, Olha Kalyna, Larysa Diedukh, Rayisa Chornohuz, Stepan Zhovnirovych, Ivan Koval', Yuri Nezovybat'ko

== Sources ==
- Kudrytsky, A. V. - Mystetsvo Ukrainy - Biohrafichnyj dovidnyk, K, 1997
- Kyrdan, B. - Omelchenko, A - Narodni spivtsi-muzykanty na Ukraini - Kiev, 1980
- Nemyrovych, I. - Vziav by ya banduru - (1986)
- Zheplynsky, B. - Korotka istoriya kobzarstva v Ukrayini - Lviv, 2000
