= Kobza =

Ukrainian stringed musical instrument

- 18th century kobza
- Classification: Chordophone
- Hornbostel–Sachs classification: 321.32-5

Related instruments
- Lute; Mandora; Torban; Starosvitska bandura

The kobza (Ukrainian: кобза), smetimes also known as the bandura (Ukrainian: бандура), is a Ukrainian folk music instrument of the lute family (Hornbostel–Sachs classification number 321.321-5+6), a relative of the Central European mandora. The term kobza however, has also been applied to a number of other Eastern European instruments distinct from the Ukrainian kobza.

== Construction ==
The Ukrainian kobza was a traditionally gut-strung, lute-like stringed musical instrument with a body hewn from a single block of wood. Instruments with a staved assembly also exist. The kobza has a medium-length neck which may or may not have tied-on frets, which were usually made of gut. It was single-strung and the strings were played with the fingertips or occasionally with a plectrum threaded through a ring placed on the middle finger.

== History ==
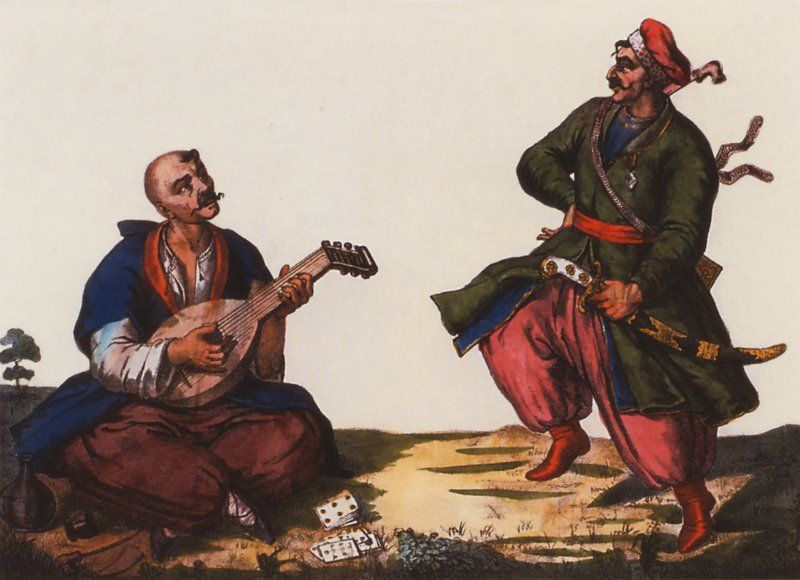
Cossack with a kobza, watercolor drawing, published in 1847

The term kobza is of Turkic origin and is related to the terms kobyz and komuz, thought to have been introduced into the Ukrainian language in the 13th century with the migration of a sizable group of Turkic people from Abkhazia settling in the Poltava region. It was usually played by a bard or minstrel known as a kobzar (occasionally in earlier times a kobeznik), who accompanies his recitation of epic poetry called duma in Ukrainian.

The Kobza acquired widespread popularity in the 16th century, with the advent of the Hetmanate (Cossack state). From the 17th century, the term bandura was often used as a synonym for the kobza. The term bandura has a Latin pedigree and reflects the growing contacts the Ukrainian people had with Western Europe, particularly in the courts of the Polish gentry. Ukrainian musicians that found employment at various German courts in the 18th century were called "pandoristen". One of these musicians, Timofiy Bilohradsky, was a lute student of Sylvius Leopold Weiss and later became a noted lute virtuoso, a court lutenist, active in Königsberg and St.Petersburg.

In the 18th century, the kobza's range was extended with an addition of several unstopped treble strings, known as "prystrunky", meaning: strings on the side, in a psaltery-like set-up. In the early 20th century the kobza went into disuse. Currently there is a revival of authentic folk kobza playing in Ukraine, due to the efforts of the "Kobzar Guild" in Kyiv and Kharkiv. The kobza revival however, is impeded by the absence of museum specimens: with the exceptions of a unique surviving 17th-century kobza at the Muzeum Narodowe in Kraków and a 19th-century kobza, which has been refurbished as a bandura, at the Museum of Theater and Cinematography, in Kyiv; almost all evidence is entirely iconographic and some photos from the 19th century.

== Etymology ==
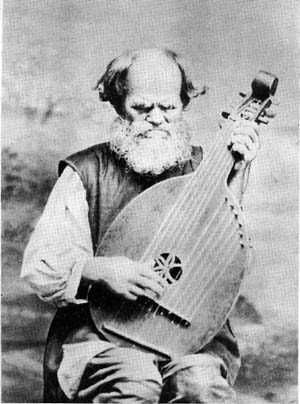
Kobzar Ostap Veresai playing a bandura, 19th century

The term kobza first appeared in Polish chronicles dating back to 1331 AD. In popular parlance the term Kobza was applied to any regional lute-like instrument used by court musicians in Central-Eastern Europe. The term was occasionally used for other musical instruments of several unrelated types. The term kobza was also used in historical sources and folk songs as a synonym of bandura in the 19th and early 20th century in Ukraine. The term was occasionally used for the bagpipes and occasionally for the hurdy-gurdy in Eastern Poland, Belarus and the Volyn region in Ukraine.

The unfretted "starosvitska" bandura, developed c. 1800 appropriated the bandura name, but was often referred to as a kobza, because of the name's historical cachet while the Romanian kobza or cobza is a different type of plucked lute.

=== Other instruments known as kobza ===
The term kobza was often used as a synonym in historical sources for bandura in the 19th and early 20th century in Ukraine and was even used for bagpipes and occasionally for the hurdy-gurdy in Eastern Poland, Belarus and the Volyn region in Ukraine. Eventually, the unfretted "starosvitska" bandura , developed c. 1800) appropriated the bandura name, but was commonly referred to as a kobza, because of the name's historical cachet. The Romanian kobza or cobza is a different type of plucked lute.

== The modern Ukrainian kobza ==
There are currently two different approaches to kobza construction: authentic fretless reconstructions, produced by adherents for the recreation of authentic folk traditions, and modern stylised fretted instruments based on a modified domra design. To date, there have been no attempts to reconstruct earlier fretted kobza of the 18th century.

=== The fretless kobza ===
The term kobza was often used as a synonym for bandura and the terms were used interchangeably until the mid-20th century. The use of the term kobza pre-dates the first known use of the term bandura.

Similarly, a "Kobzar" is a Ukrainian Folk singer and musician who may play the kobza, but who might also play other instruments instead, including the bandura. The internationally known kobzar Ostap Veresay (1803–1890), is today considered the foremost kobza player of the 19th century despite the fact that he referred to his instrument as a bandura.

He was a representative of the playing tradition stopping the strings along the neck but without frets. Veresay's instrument had six single unstopped strings mounted along the treble side of the instrument and six stoppable strings strung along the neck. The strings strung along the neck and side are plucked by the right hand with the left hand stopping the strings on the fingerboard.

After O. Veresay's death in 1890 the instrument fell into disuse until its revival in the 1980s by Mykola Budnyk and exemplified by such players as Volodymyr Kushpet, Taras Kompanichenko, Eduard Drach, and Jurij Fedynskyj.

=== The modern fretted kobza ===
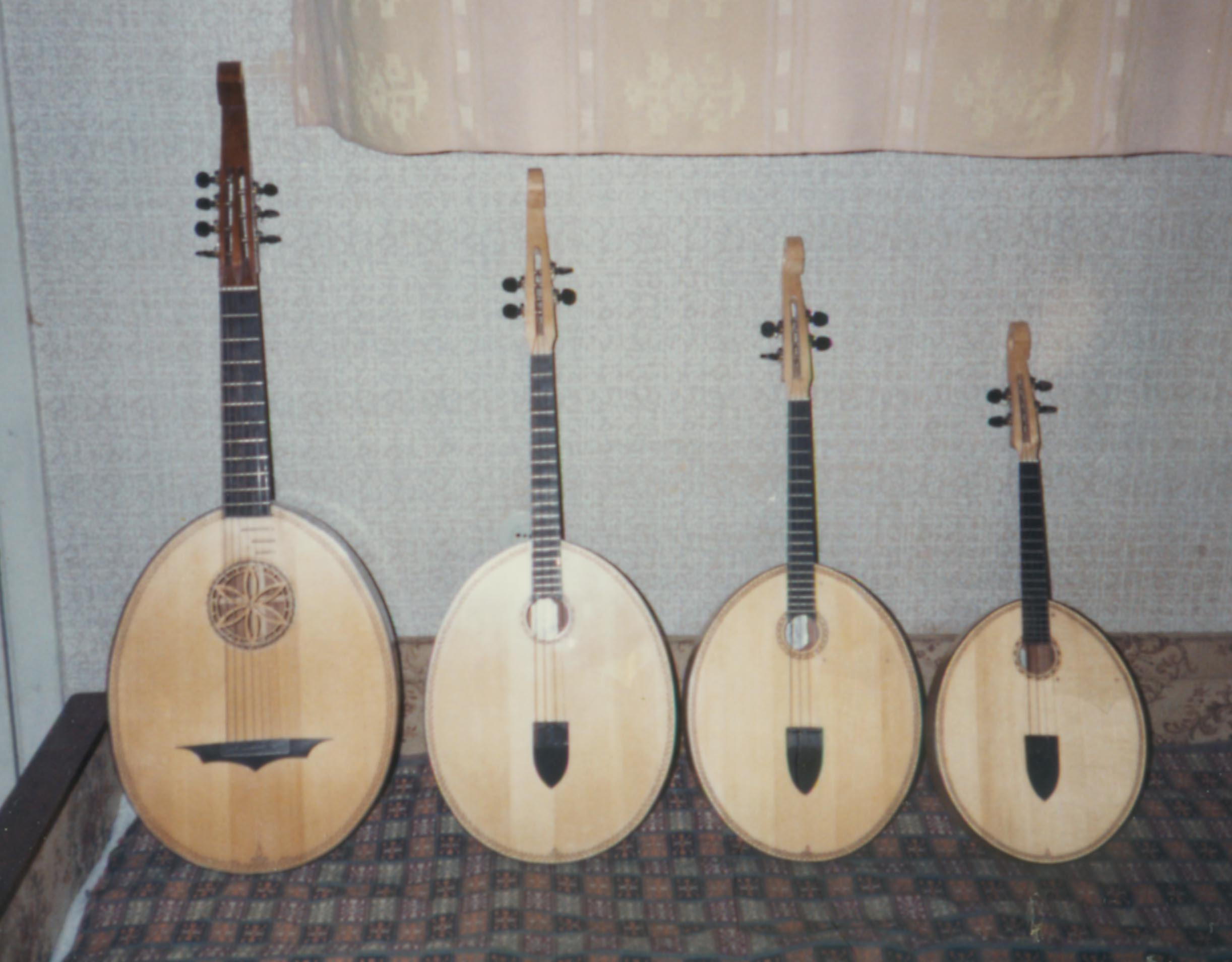
The instruments are made today in prima (soprano), alto and tenor and contrabass sizes

A fretted version of the kobza was used by Paul Konoplenko-Zaporozhetz, who recorded a disc of kobza music for Folkways. Konoplenko first picked up the fretted kobza before the Revolution in 1917 in Kyiv from Vasyl' Potapenko and played on this instrument after emigrating to Winnipeg, Manitoba, Canada. Konoplenko's instrument had eight strings strung along the neck and four treble strings strung on the soundboard. The tuning used was reminiscent of the seven-string Russian guitar tuning (open G tuning).

Fretted kobzas were also developed by Mykola Prokopenko, who wrote a Ph.D. dissertation in 1976 on his efforts to reconstruct and resurrect the fretted Kobza. Prokopenko suggested that the four-stringed domra, an instrument widely taught in music schools in Ukraine but considered a Russian folk instrument but actually not used in Russia, be replaced by the fretted kobza. Although Prokopenko's suggestion was not supported in 1976, it is currently being resurrected by musicians in Ukraine in the Academic folk instrument movement, particularly at the Kyiv Conservatory.

- Orchestral kobza, with four strings tuned in fifths using tunings that parallel those used by the instruments of the violin family. The instruments are made in prima (soprano), alto and tenor and contrabass sizes.
- Accompaniment kobza, usually having six or seven strings and a fretted neck. The six-string version uses standard guitar tuning. The seven-string version uses a Russian guitar (open G chord) tuning.

== See also ==
- Kobzar
- Torban
- Bandura
- Cobza
- Kobyz, a Kazakh bowed string instrument
- Ukrainian folk music

== Sources ==
- Diakowsky, M. - A Note on the History of the Bandura. The Annals of the Ukrainian Academy of Arts and Sciences in the U.S. - 4, 3-4 №1419, N.Y. 1958 - С.21-22
- Diakowsky, M. J. - The Bandura. The Ukrainian Trend, 1958, №I, - С.18-36
- Diakowsky, M. – Anyone can make a bandura – I did. The Ukrainian Trend, Volume 6
- Haydamaka, L. – Kobza-bandura – National Ukrainian Musical Instrument. "Guitar Review" №33, Summer 1970 (С.13-18)
- Mishalow, V. - A Brief Description of the Zinkiv Method of Bandura Playing. Bandura, 1982, №2/6, - С.23-26
- Mishalow, V. - A Short History of the Bandura. East European Meetings in Ethnomusicology 1999, Romanian Society for Ethnomusicology, Volume 6, - С.69-86
- Mizynec, V. - Folk Instruments of Ukraine. Bayda Books, Melbourne, Australia, 1987 - 48с.
- Cherkaskyi, L. - Ukrainski narodni muzychni instrumenty. Tekhnika, Kyiv, Ukraine, 2003 - 262 pages. ISBN 966-575-111-5
