= Torban =

Ukrainian musical instrument

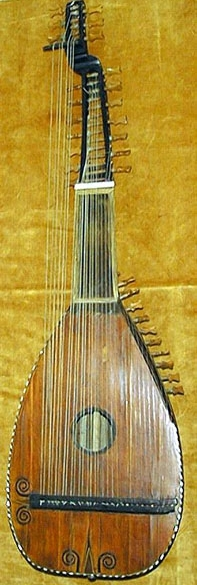
- Classification: Chordophone
- Hornbostel–Sachs classification: 321.321-5

Playing range
- Varied

Related instruments
- Lute; Theorbo; Angelique; Kobza; Starosvitska bandura; Husli; Bandura

The torban (Ukrainian: Торбан, also teorban or Ukrainian theorbo) is a Ukrainian musical instrument that combines the features of the Baroque lute with those of the psaltery. The Torban differs from the more common European bass lute known as the theorbo in that it had additional short unfretted treble strings (known as prystrunky) strung along the treble side of the soundboard.

== Overview ==
It appeared in the second quarter of the 18th century, probably influenced by the central European Theorbo and the Angelique which, according to Ukrainian sources Cossack mercenaries would have encountered in the Thirty Years' War. According to Marcin Ludwicki and Roman Turovsky, the torban's inventor was Tuliglowski, a Paulite monk from Jasna Gora, who designed the instrument between 1736 and 1740. The Torban was manufactured and used mainly in Ukraine, but also occasionally encountered in neighbouring Poland and Russia (only 3 luthiers could be identified from the surviving instruments). There are about 40 torbans in museums around the world, with the largest group of 14 instruments in St. Petersburg. The term "torban" was often misapplied in the vernacular in western Ukraine to any instrument of the Baroque Lute type until the early 20th century.

The surviving printed musical literature for torban is extremely limited, notwithstanding the widespread use of the instrument in Eastern Europe. It was an integral part of the urban oral culture in Ukraine, both in Russian and Polish (later Austro-Hungarian Empire) controlled parts of the country (after the split). To date the only notated examples of torban music recorded are a group of songs from the repertoire of Franz Widort; collected by Ukrainian composer and ethnographer Mykola Lysenko and published in the "Kievskaya Starina" journal in 1892, with a collection of songs by Tomasz Padura published in Warsaw in 1844.

The multi-strung, expensive in manufacture, stringing, maintenance and technically difficult fretted torban was considered an instrument of Ukrainian gentry, although most of its practitioners were Ukrainians and Jews of low birth, with a few aristocratic exceptions. A few virtuoso players are known by their reputation, such as Andrey Sychra (from Lithuania), and the Widort family, originally from Austria but active in Ukraine since the late 18th century. The Widort family produced three generations of torban players: Gregor Widort, his son Cajetan, and grandson Franz.

Such aristocratic associations sealed the instrument's fate in the aftermath of the Russian Revolution: it was deemed insufficiently proletarian and was discouraged. A predecessor of the torban called the kobza (also sometimes referred to as the bandura) was the instrument of the common folk. It differed from the torban by the absence of a second peg box at the end of the neck and the lack of bass strings, and was closely related in its organology to central European mandora and other instruments descending from the pandura (also see lute).

Later in the 20th century, some banduras were often manufactured to imitate the look of the torban, which has also contributed to its misidentification.

== See also ==
- Ukrainian folk music

== Bibliography ==
- Cherkaskyi, L. - Ukrainski narodni muzychni instrumenty – Tekhnika, Kyiv, Ukraine, 2003 – 262 pages. ISBN 966-575-111-5
