= Shell National Folkloric Festival =

Australian festival celebrating ethnic folklore

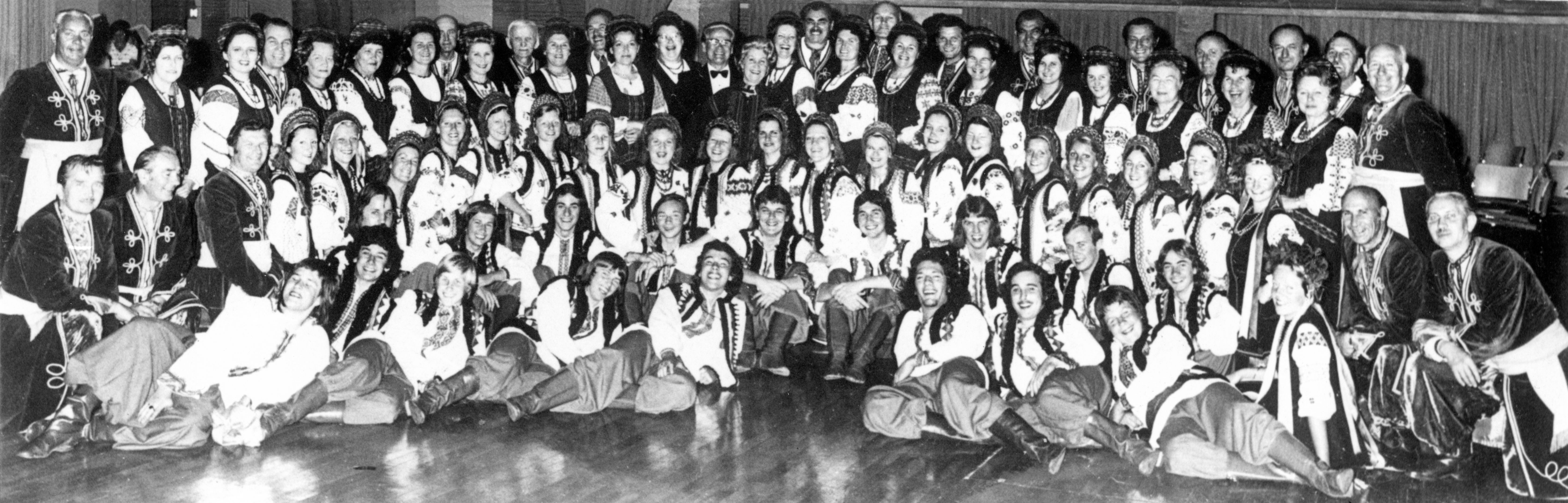
"Boyan" Ukrainian choir with the "Ukrainian Folk Ballet". Photo taken during the Shell National Folkloric Festival in 1974, Sydney.

Shell National Folkloric Festival was an annual ethnic folk festival held in Australia. Sponsored by the Shell-Sydney Opera House Foundation with a grant of $50,000, the first Festival was held at the Concert Hall during the opening celebrations of the Sydney Opera House in 1973. The festivals were held in Sydney but were later also held in Melbourne, Perth, Adelaide, Darwin and Brisbane.

In 1975 one thousand performers, representing 30 ethnic groups living in Australia, performed folk music, song and dance at the Opera House, and by 1982 this had grown to 1400 performers representing 48 different ethnic groups.

One of its first producer-directors was Victor Carell (Victor Thomas Cioccarelli), who with his wife Beth Dean (a notable Australian ballerina and choreographer) auditioned ethnic groups in Sydney, Adelaide. Canberra, and Wollongong for the festival.

From 1979 to 1994, Guillermo Keys-Arenas was the major artistic producer-director of the annual event.

== Performing Groups ==
Between 1973 and 1994 performers representing ethnic groups from Australia, Austria, Armenia, Bulgaria, Burma, Chile, Croatia, Greece, Hungary, Ireland, Israel, Latvia, Lebanon, Lithuania, Poland, Russia, Scotland, Sweden, and Ukraine, performed at the Festival.

Groups which performed at the Festival included:

- Ensemble Gavrilo Princip - Serbian National Defence Council with choreographer Milivoje Stojanovic
- Boyan Ukrainian Choir, with Basil Matyash as conductor
- Daina Sydney Lithuanian Choir, with Zita Belkutė and Bronius Kiveris as conductors
- Dorothy Kerr's Highland Dancers
- Grandinele Lithuanian National Dancing Group, with Ginta Viliunas as a featured dancer
- Hnat Khotkevych Ukrainian Bandurist Ensemble, with Hryhory Bazhul and later Peter Deriashnyj as artistic directors
- Jautrais Pāris, Latvian folk dance group from Sydney (and Canberra)
- Jadran Hajduk - Choreographer Milivoje Stojanovic
- Koleda Croatian Folkloric Ensemble
- KUD Makedonija Yagoona - Choreographer Milivoje Stojanovic
- "Los Chilenos" Folkloric Group with Andres & Veronica Alarcon as artistic directors
- Oplenac Folklore Dancing Group (Yugoslavia), with Vera Djuric as director
- Syrenka Polish Ensemble, with Josef Walczak as artistic director
- Punjabi Bhangra Group of NSW (India), with Sardool Singh as director
- Folkloric dancing School - Sydney Choreographer Milivoje Stojanovic
- Sprigulitis Latvian group
- Swiss Yodlers of Sydney
- Ukrainian National Ballet, with Natalia Tyrawsky as artistic director
- Virmalised Folk Dancing Group (Estonia), with Annelie Sildnik as director
- The Mary Nassibian Dancers representing Greece and Egypt
- Arabesque dance troupe (Middle Eastern dance)
- Yugal Folkloric dancers (Yugoslavia) - Choreographer Milivoje Stojanovic
