= Guillermo Keys-Arenas =

Mexican-Australian ballet dancer and choreographer

Guillermo Keys-Arenas (1928 — 31 January 2006) was a dancer and choreographer. He is remembered for his eight-year association with Ballet Folklorico de Mexico for which he was artistic coordinator and ballet master, as well as his contribution to dance in Australia.

== Biography ==
Guillermo Keys-Arenas was born in El Ebano in the state of San Luis Potosí, northern Mexico. From his earliest days he was obsessed with theatre, and when the family moved to Mexico City, his mother enrolled the seven-year-old with the National Dance School.

== Dancing debut ==
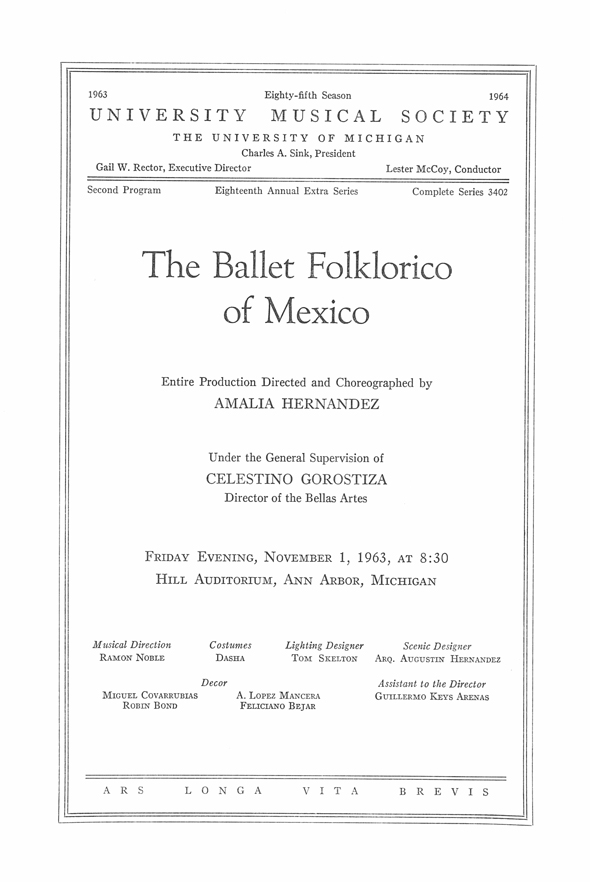
Concert program cover of performance of the Ballet Folklorico de Mexico at the University of Michigan in 1963. Guillermo is the Assistant to the Director Amalia Hernandez.

His professional debut was made with the Mexico City Ballet in 1945. His dancing abilities were rewarded by grants from the Rockefeller Foundation, the British Council and the French government, enabling him to study ballet and modern dance in the US, Britain, France and Sweden.

Keys-Arenas danced and choreographed for ballet, film, musical comedy, television and opera in Mexico, working for the Opera de Bellas Artes, Teatro de los Insurgentes, Ballet Concierto de Mexico, Ballet Nacional de Mexico and many others. Internationally, he had engagements with the Antonio and Rosario Spanish Ballet, the Spanish Ballet of Roberto Iglesias, the Bat-Dor Dance Company of Israel and Ballet Clasico de Guatemala.

He was assistant director and also choreographer of the Broadway productions of Ballet Español (7–12 October 1958; September 1959) In 1963 he was the Assistant to the Director of Ballet Folklorico de Mexico, while in 1969 he was its Artistic Coordinator.

== Work in Australia ==
In 1974 Keys-Arenas came to live in Australia, and was naturalized in 1999, though he retained his Mexican citizenship. Engagements included:

- ballet master and teacher for the Dance Company of NSW (now Sydney Dance Company)
- ballet master of the folk-dance group Dance Concert (1975), and later becoming its artistic director (1978)
- teacher, lecturer or choreographer with the Australian Ballet School, the Australian Ballet, all the state dance companies, the Victorian College of the Arts, NIDA, University of Western Sydney and many dance schools.
- choreographer for Sydney Theatre Company; five Australian Opera productions; the Royal New Zealand Ballet and University of Shanghai.

== Folkloric festivals ==
One of his greatest achievements was his significant contribution to multiculturalism through his involvement with the annual Shell National Folkloric Festival, sponsored by the Sydney Opera House with various partners, which he directed from 1979 to 1994. The festivals were held in Sydney at first but later in Melbourne, Perth, Adelaide, Darwin and Brisbane.

== Awards ==
He has been twice honored by Mexico: in 1988 he was granted national homage by the Mexican government for "a whole life of dance", and in 2003 he received the homage of the National Institute of Fine Arts from the National Council for Culture and the Arts.

The Sydney Eisteddfod has an award in the "World Dance" category — the Guillermo Keys-Arenas Memorial Award, in his honor.
