= Hnat Khotkevych Ukrainian Bandurist Ensemble =

Ukrainian folkloric ensemble

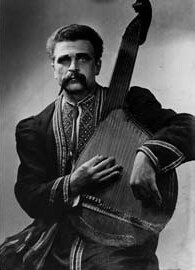
- Hryhory Bazhul

Background information
- Origin: Sydney, Australia
- Genres: Ukrainian folk
- Years active: June 1964 –
- Members: Peter Deriashnyj
- Past members: Hryhory Bazhul

The Hnat Khotkevych Ukrainian Bandurist Ensemble is a vocal and instrumental Ukrainian folkloric performing ensemble in Sydney, Australia. It was founded in June 1964 by bandurist Hryhory Bazhul and since May 1971 was directed by Peter Deriashnyj.

== Origins ==
At the end of World War II, bandurist Hryhory Bazhul emigrated to Sydney, Australia where he continued to perform for the Ukrainian community. Having had performing success in a number of bandura ensembles in Germany during the post-war years (1944–49), he was keen to establish a similar ensemble in Sydney where he had settled on completion of his immigrant contract.

In 1952, Bazhul advertised in The Free Thought Ukrainian-language newspaper in an attempt to locate like-minded individuals. Two years later he befriended vocalist Pavlo Stetsenko and began to teach him to play bandura. Over the next 4–5 years another six individuals joined the group and began to develop a bandura technique and repertoire.

In time, this group of singer-bandurists began performing, initially in Sydney, and then in Melbourne to enthusiastic audiences. To mark the 100th anniversary of Taras Shevchenko death the group gave a series of concerts in Sydney and Melbourne and also produced a recording of four songs from their repertoire.

By 1963, after some 39 rehearsals (2–3 per month), five individuals of adult age and various levels of musical and vocal ability worked diligently to create a 17-song repertoire. This group had to overcome numerous difficulties related to the establishment of a bandurist ensemble in Australia, such as: manufacturing instruments; the procurement of suitable strings; tuning pegs and tuning keys. All these posed insurmountable problems. The development of repertoire was also an obstacle since no one in the group had suitable experience in arranging vocal works, as was the problem of duplication of musical scores. Repertoire collected by Bazhul from various sources was initially used and gradually all the other problems were overcome by sheer effort, which testifies to the tenacity of this ensemble and its founder. Then unexpectedly personal difficulties saw some of the members leave and now finding itself vocally incomplete the quintet ceased its activities in February 1964.

== New generation bandurists ==
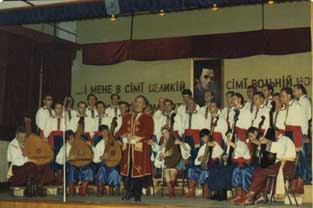
Khotkevych Bandurist Ensemble and Sydney Boyan Choir, Australia, 1968. Vasyl Matiash conductor.

Hryhory Bazhul turned to the younger generation and in June 1964 he began to teach the first younger generation student - George Work, the Kharkiv style bandura. Gradually more young individuals of student age took to learning the difficult art of the bandura minstrels. The attrition rate however for the young inductees was high since there was no peer group to take encouragement and inspiration from.

With the support of the Ukrainian Scouting movement and the conductor of the Ukrainian Choir Boyan - Vasyl Matiash, young scouts began to learn to play the instrument privately and a new generation of bandurists formed the Khotkevych Ensemble. In time the small group made numerous independent performances and also on many occasions accompanied the Boyan Choir under the direction of Vasyl Matiash. The new youth ensemble also included female participants.

By 1970 some 19 students had embarked on learning the art, however a core group of some seven students remained and became known as the Hnat Khotkevych Bandurist Ensemble. They became the backbone of the Ensemble for the next few years. Hnat Khotkevych had taught Hryhory Bazhul to play the Kharkiv style bandura in Ukraine, and as a mark of respect Bazhul chose to give this new ensemble Khotkevych's name.

As the group's popularity grew, the Ensemble became the moving force for the development of bandura art in Australia. It became evident that a formal school for learning bandura art in a central location with easy access to public transport needed to be established. Up until 1968 most new students were taught privately by Hryhory Bazhul at his residence in Fairfield West.

== New direction ==
After moving to Sydney from Newcastle in 1966, Peter Deriashnyj contacted Hryhory Bazhul in July 1967 to pursue studies with the bandura, specifically the Kharkiv style of bandura.

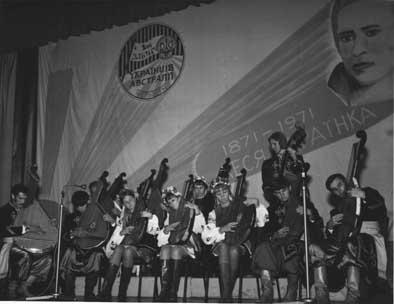
The Hnat Khotkevych bandurist ensemble under the direction of P. Deriashnyj - Melbourne, 1971.

Deriashnyj joined Bazhul's small group of 5 bandurists in November 1967 and encouraged the existing members to include vocal study into the weekly practice routine. H. Bazhul supported this proposal and elevated him to concertmaster. His first act was to bring all instruments to a concert standard by the renewal of old or rusting strings and repairing of cracked instruments. Throughout 1968 the group worked diligently at combining 4 part vocals accompanied to their own bandura playing. A specific concert repertoire was selected and new bandura parts were written with a mind to the development of vocal and instrumental skills.

Their first independent concert took place in March 1969 in Wollongong, and was dedicated to the Ukrainian bard Taras Shevchenko. This concert was later repeated in Sydney. The new repertoire including the vocal performance of the Ensemble had an effect on the young Ukrainians in the audience and under Deriashnyj's direction the group attracted talented individuals and continued to expand its repertoire and playing technique. Challenging 4 part (SATB) choral vocals accompanied by 4 bandura parts - 1st and 2nd Kharkiv banduras and 1st and 2nd Chernihiv banduras became the norm.

From 1970 the ensemble toured the eastern states in Australia continually performing at community functions, historic anniversaries and numerous folkloric and ethnic festivals throughout Australia. In March 1971, ten bandurists with bassist Oless Tindyk gave an important concert in Newcastle dedicated to the bard Taras Shevchenko. At this concert a men's group and a women's group each performed 3 songs from their new repertoire as well as combining for the full ensemble performance - 14 items. The one negative issue to be exposed was a serious disagreement between the performing members as to who had voting rights in financial or performance matters. Of the many festivals the ensemble took part in, the most renowned was the Shell National Folkloric Festival held in the Sydney Opera House - from approx. 1976 to late 1980s when eventually the festival ceased activities. the Ensemble's performances at the National Folkloric Festival were enhanced by the participation of its inter-state members.

In 1972, with donations received from caroling during the Christmas period and from individuals throughout Australia, Deriashnyj established the Sydney School of Bandura which was located at the Ukrainian Central School in Lidcombe. The funds were used to buy 3 or 4 banduras which were then used to introduce the 10- to 15-year-old generation to the art of bandura. Students of the School of Bandura were able to study in both the Kharkiv style and the Chernihiv style however, since Kharkiv banduras were difficult to obtain and more expensive to produce, the more plentiful and relatively inexpensive Chernihiv type banduras began to predominate. The Sydney School of Bandura however was the only one in the diaspora to teach and propagate the Kharkiv style.

With due consideration for his state of health, Bazhul transferred the leadership of the Ensemble to bandurist Peter Deriashnyj in May 1971. This change did not sit well with some of the bandurists that were still wrestling with membership voting issues, let alone accept a new leader, the result being that the Ensemble lost four experienced members in that year. The new Ensemble, showing so much promise found itself vocally incomplete—at this crossroad, the previous group ceased its activities. The four who left were also vocally incomplete and did not continue as a separate group. Undaunted, Deriashnyj and the remaining dedicated bandurists began to re-group over the next 3–4 years. An experienced and talented group of singer-bandurists was formed and they aspired towards a professional level of performance. All the while Deriashnyj gave weekly tuition to the younger students attending the bandura class at the School for Bandura in Lidcombe.

All the hard work paid off and in November 1975 the Ensemble together with the students of the Sydney School of Bandura gave a concert entitled "In the footsteps of the minstrels" (Шляхами Кобзарів). The younger students astounded the audience by playing two parts in the bandura accompaniment and singing in two-voice harmony. Fedir Deriashnyj, a bandurist and craftsman of banduras from Newcastle also performed works that he learned from minstrels in Ukraine during the mid-1920s. Apart from a varied repertoire of Ukrainian folk songs, the Ensemble showed the versatility of the bandura by including in its performance contemporary non-Ukrainian songs adapted and arranged by Deriashnyj - "500 Miles" (Hedy West), "Mr. Tambourine Man" (Bob Dylan) and "A Horse with No Name" (Dewey Bunnell).

This concert had a great positive effect on the Ukrainian younger generation in Sydney. The high quality of the performances and the new repertoire attracted many new students to the group. The numbers of students at the Sydney School of Bandura grew to the point where the Ensemble's committee could no longer cope with the added administrative burden and a parent's committee was established.

== Khotkevych quartet ==
In June 1974, finding itself somewhat vocally incomplete, the Ensemble could not celebrate its 10th anniversary with a concert, instead a low-key social event took place. Unfortunately, experienced singer-bandurist Lesia Bilash was given a teaching position in country NSW. But simultaneously, a young university student - Peter Chochula with a bass voice showing great potential began to study the art through private tuition from Deriashnyj. Working enthusiastically through 1975, the group developed a good blend with the voices of the four existing members - Neonila Babchenko-Deriashnyj (soprano), Lidia Deriashnyj-Di-Scullo (Alto), Peter Deriashnyj (tenor) and Peter Chochula (bass).

In Jan. 1976 the quartet's performances came to the attention of recording technician Peter Ilyk after a performance at a Canberra international folk festival. Ilyk suggested the ensemble consider recording its repertoire, especially any fresh compositions or arrangements. The Ensemble embarked on recording an LP with some 12 songs from its repertoire. After some 14 months work the master tape was accidentally erased and recording began a fresh—but with a higher performance standard and much more instrumental and vocal precision and eventually in 1978 the LP entitled Bandura and Song was released for sale. The members of the quartet were: Neonila Babchenko-Deriashnyj (Soprano), Lidia Deriashnyj-Beal (alto), Peter Chochula (bass) and Peter Deriashnyj (tenor). The quartet toured Australia with concerts and performances selling its LP to audiences in Perth, Western Australia, Hobart, Adelaide, Melbourne and Geelong.

== All Australian Bandura Seminars ==
The concert tours and the sales of the LP Bandura and Song had a significant effect on bandura enthusiasts in Melbourne, Adelaide and Canberra. Ensembles in these towns that were already in the making renewed their efforts and began an active concert performing career. The banduras for these ensembles came from Ukraine and were of the Chernihiv type - some were even equipped with mechanisms that enabled the rapid changing of the key to which the instrument was tuned. This permitted the performance of more interesting and challenging bandura works.

In 1981, under the initiative of the musical director of the Sydney School of Bandura Roxolana Mishalow, a federal organization was established and registered known as the Federation of Bandurists in Australia. The organization's mandate was to unite the growing number of bandurists in Australia and to share information. A grant was received from the Australia Arts Council to organize a bandura seminar and to pay for a special guest teacher and performer from the USA. The seminar took place at Sydney University in January 1982 with Julian Kytasty as guest tutor and lecturer. 38 bandurist from around Australia participated with the final concert being recorded by SBS television.

In Jan 1982 a second seminar was organized under the Administration of Ukrainian Kobzarski Seminars in Australia (Yкраїнські Кобзарські Семінарі в Австралії - У.K.C.A.) by musical director Peter Deriashnyj from Sydney and Administrator Dr. Igor Yakubovych, the director of Melbourne's "Lesia Ukrainka" Bandurist Ensemble. 25 students from South Australia, Victoria, New South Wales and Queensland took part. At this seminar the national bandurist association called "Ukrainian Kobzarski Seminars in Australia" was ratified by the students present. In Jan 1985, again under the initiative of the Y.K.C.A. organisation, the largest of the Australia wide seminars took place in Sydney with some 35 bandurist/students attending.

== 1985–1994 The Ivasiuk Folk Ensemble years ==
In June 1984, on the occasion of the 5th anniversary of the suspicious death of Ukrainian contemporary composer V. Ivasiuk, the group took part in a remembrance concert in Sydney where many of the younger generation musician, singers, instrumentalists also took part. The success of this concert saw the founding of the Ivasiuk Folk Ensemble by Peter Deriashnyj. For the next 10 years the Khotkevich Bandurist Ensemble worked as an instrumental support ensemble, effectively forming a choir with bandura accompaniment—a bandura capella. In the following years this powerful choral instrumental combination saw concert performances in Brisbane, Newcastle, Sydney, Canberra and Melbourne. The bandura ensemble still performed as an independent group but the combination with the four-part choral vocals of the Ivasiuk Folk Ensemble was the high-water mark for both groups. At this time much of Deriashnyj's attention was directed toward the Ivasiuk Folk Ensemble so the bandura group's assistant director, Peter Chochulla, took on the capella-master role, managing and organising rehearsals.

== Membership ==
Members of the all-male adult group

- Hryhory Bazhul
- Edward Kulchytsky
- Vasyl Onufrienko
- Pavlo Stecenko
- Stepan Khvylia
- Pavlo Daineka
- Pavlo Diachenko (bandura craftsman),
- Leonid Denysenko

Members of the new generation Khotkevych Ensemble

- George Wowk
- Andrew Tesliuk
- Bohdan Huzij
- Slavko Shijan
- Volodymyr Motyka
- Lesia Bilash
- Peter Deriashnyj
- Lydia Tindyk
- Stefanie Adamovska
- Bohdan Brakh
- Lidia Deriashna - Kiev/Chernihiv style
- Nila Babchenko/Deriashna
- Petro Chochula
- Michael Dimitri
- Jurij Chomiak
- Alex Tindyk (Bassist)
- Stephan Wasylyk (Bassist)

Notable students of the Sydney School for Bandura

- Victor Mishalow - Kiev/Chernihiv style

== See also ==
- Ukrainian diaspora
- Ukrainian Australian
