= Peter Deriashnyj =

Peter Deriashnyj Петро Деряжний
- Born: Petro Fedorovych Deriazhnyi
- Genres: Ukrainian folk, dumas and classical music
- Occupations: bandurist, composer, conductor
- Instrument: bandura

Peter Deriashnyj (born Petro Fedorovych Deriazhnyi (Note: Ukrainian: Петро Федорович Деряжний, romanized: Petro Fedorovych Deriazhnyi)) is a Ukrainian Australian bandurist, composer of secular and sacred music, and choral conductor. He specializes in the Kharkiv style of bandura playing, but also plays folk and rock guitar.

Deriashnyj was born in Calden, Germany and grew up in Newcastle, New South Wales and moved to Sydney to further his professional career and musical education. He studied music theory, composition and voice in Sydney and later became conductor of the Hnat Khotkevych Ukrainian Bandurist Ensemble (1972–), the Boyan Ukrainian Choir (1982–1996), the Suzwittia Women's Ensemble (1986–1991), the Strathfield Orthodox Parish choir (1980–2007); and musical director and conductor of the Ivasiuk Folk Ensemble (1984–2000).

== Early life ==
Deriashnyj emigrated to Australia with his parents, Fedir and Maria and sister Lidia. In November 1950 they arrived in Melbourne on the passenger liner Goya initially living in migrant camps in Bonegilla and Nelson Bay before settling in Newcastle, New South Wales. After completing his education in Newcastle he moved to Sydney in 1966 to pursue studies in electrical engineering at the Sydney Institute of Technology graduating in 1972, also formal musical studies in classical guitar, music theory, composition and voice.

At age 10, Deriashnyj began to learn to play the bandura from his father, a known performer on and maker of banduras Fedir Deriashnyj. At age 17, he began to study guitar.

== Hnat Khotkevych Ukrainian Bandurist Ensemble ==
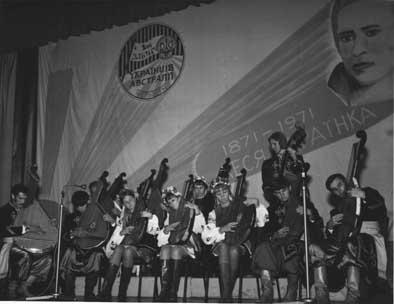
The Hnat Khotkevych bandurist ensemble under the direction of P. Deriashnyj – Melbourne, 1971.

In July 1968, he began to study the Kharkiv style of bandura from Hryhory Bazhul who in the early 1930s in Ukraine had studied bandura under Hnat Khotkevych. In 1969 he wrote his first composition for the bandura "Krai Kozachiy", followed by "Zaspivayu" to the words by Taras Shevchenko, and "Slava Otamanu". He also began to write arrangements of traditional songs for the Kharkiv style bandura. He gave up guitar for bandura, and in 1971 he became the artistic director of a small group of young bandurists originally formed by Hryhory Bazhul, the Hnat Khotkevych Ukrainian Bandurist Ensemble of Sydney. Under Deriashnyj's direction the group expanded in numbers and included choral vocals in their performances. Their first solo concert took place in 1969 in Wollongong, dedicated to the Ukrainian bard Taras Shevchenko. In 1971 he also formed the Sydney School of Bandura to introduce the younger generation to the art of this instrument. Students of the School of Bandura were able to learn both the Kharkiv style and the Chernihiv style but since Kharkiv banduras were difficult to procure and the more plentiful Chernihiv type banduras were being brought from Ukraine, gradually more students played the Chernihiv style. The Sydney School of Bandura was the only one in Australia to teach the Kharkiv style.

From 1970, the Bandurist Ensemble toured the eastern states in Australia with concerts and performances and as a quartet performed in Perth, Hobart, Adelaide, Melbourne and Geelong. In 1978 the quartet recorded an LP entitled Bandura and Song. The members of the quartet were Neonila Babchenko-Deriashnyj (soprano), Lidia Deriashnyj-Beal (alto) and Peter Chochula (bass).

== Choral conducting ==
By 1986 Deriashnyj became a significant cultural figure within the Ukrainian diaspora in Sydney, as the artistic director of the Ukrainian Bandurist Ensemble, the Ivasiuk Folk Ensemble, the Boyan National Choir and the Suzwittia Women's Ensemble. He also conducted the church choir of the parish of the Holy Intercession in Strathfield, simultaneously.

In 1984, Deriashnyj prepared a concert in memory of Ukrainian songwriter Volodymyr Ivasyuk, who lost his life in suspicious circumstances. The success of this concert provided the initiative for the participants to form a new vocal ensemble in Sydney, New South Wales.

In 1988, the ensembles and choirs under his direction celebrated the millennium of Christianity in Ukraine with concert performances in Brisbane, Sydney, Newcastle and Wollongong, and Canberra.

=== Solo and duet performances ===
In 2010, during the visit to Australia of Dymytrii (Rudiuk), Metropolitan of Lviv and Sokal, they sang the high mass (arhiyereyska) in Brisbane and Newcastle Orthodox parishes. At the Divine Liturgy in Newcastle, they were awarded a patriarchal citation for service to the Orthodox Church and the Ukrainian people by the Metropolitan on behalf of Filaret, Patriarch of Kyiv and all of Rus-Ukraine.

In 2010 they travelled to Canada to conduct and sing for the first Divine Liturgy for the Ukrainian Orthodox Church of the Kyivan Patriarchate, in the Parish of St. Peter and Paul in New Westminster and to perform in Canada's National Ukrainian Festival at Dauphin, Manitoba, and in the Kyiv Pavilion at the Folklorama Festival in Winnipeg.

Deriashnyj played the duma "Dedication to the victims of the Holodomor" during Holodomor-Famine commemorations by the Ukrainian community at the site of the Holodomor memorial in Adelaide in 2010, and at the Ukrainian Orthodox Centre in Canberra in 2011.

== Tours ==
- Australia (1986) Melbourne with Khotkevych Bandurist Ensemble of Sydney and Ivasiuk Folk Ensemble
- Australia (1988) Melbourne, Canberra, Brisbane, Newcastle, Wollongong with Khotkevych Bandurist Ensemble of Sydney and Ivasiuk Folk Ensemble
- Ukraine (2003) Duet with Neonila – Kharkiv, Velyka Pysarivka, Kyiv
- Ukraine (2008) Duet with Neonila – Kyiv, Stritivka, Rivne, Kharkiv
- Canada (2010) Duet with Neonila – Vancouver, Dauphin, Winnipeg

== Compositions ==
=== Songs and choral works for Kharkiv bandura style ===
- Land of the Kozaks – Край козачий(1969) – words by V. Masliak
- Glory to the Otaman – Слава Отаману (1969) – words unknown author
- Hamaliya – Гамалія (1969) – words T. Shevchenko
- Hope – Надія (1971) – words Lesya Ukrainka
- Heneralovi Chupryntsi (1972) – incomplete – words Marko Boyeslav
- Nochuvaly Haydamaky – Ночували Гайдамаки (1972) – words T. Shevchenko
- I Sing – Заспіваю (1973) – words Taras Shevchenko
- "Duma about Petlura" – "Дума про Петлюру" – words by kobzar Ivan Kuchuhura Kucherenko
- Kobza and song – Кобза і пісня (1978)(Bandura and song) – words by A. Yuriniak*
- Flag of Ukraine – Прапор України (1978) – words Ivan Danilchuk (Canadian poet)
- Oh song, oh song – Пісне, пісне (1978) – words Zoya Kohut (Aust. poet)
- Blue eyes – Очі сині – words P. Vakulenko
- Beyond the village – За селом (1982) – words Bozhena Kovalenko (Aust. poet)
- Oh my maples – Клени, мої клени (1986) words Svitlana Kuzmenko and Stefania Hurko (Canadian Poets)
- About mother – Про матір – words Ivan Smal-Stotskiy (Australian poet)
- Murmur from Chihirin – Гомін з Чигрину (1987) – words M. Ch.
- Farewell – Прощання (1987) – words Bozhena Kovalenko (Aust. poet)
- Zazhurylasia smereka – Зажурилася смерека (1987) – poem about V. Ivasiuk smuggled out of Ukraine
- A prayer for Ukraine – Молитва України (1998) – words Tetiana Domashenko
- Cranes – Лелеки (1998) – words Basil Onyfrienko (Aust. Poet)
- Song for Sahaydachnoho – Пісня про Сагайдачного (1998) incomplete – words Basil Onyfrienko (Australian poet)
- Mohutniy Volodartsi (1999) – words Ludmila Sarakula (Australian poet)
- Ballad about an eagle – Балада про орла (1999) – words Tetiana Voloshko (Australian poet)
- The Milky Way – Чимацький шлях (2000) – words Klava Roshko (Aust. poet)
- Song for the Bandura – Бандурі (2008) words Lubov Zabashta
- Song for Otaman Zelenoho – Пісня про Отамана Зеленого (2009) – words Mykola Shcherbak

=== Sacred music for choir ===
- Christ is risen (1981)
- The Great Litany (1982)
- First Antiphon – Bless the Lord, O my soul (1983)
- Lord's Prayer (1984)
- The Small Litany No. 1, 2, 3 (1985–86)
- The Great Eucharistic Prayer (1986)
- Tropar for St. Volodymyr (1988) Commemorating millennium of Christianity in Ukraine
- It is Right in Truth – Dostoyno ye (1988)
- Father and Son – Otsia i Sina (1996)
- The Holy Communion Hymn – (1986)
- Second Antiphon – Only Begotten Son (1997) Dedicated to Maria and Fedir Deriashnyj
- Third Antiphon – The Beatitudes (1997)
- Small Litany for the Catechumens (1998)
- Pridite poklonimos (1998)
- The Thrice-Holy Hymn – Sviatiy Bozhe (1998)
- Aliluyia, Glory to Thee, o Lord(1998)
- The Creed (1998)
- The Dismissal (1999)
- The Annunciation (1999)
- We have seen the True Light (2000)
- The Lords Prayer (2001) in memory of victims of 11 September 2001 terrorist attacks
- God with us (2005)

=== Instrumental arrangements ===
- Chariots of fire – music by Vangelis (for 3 banduras)
- Shchedryk – music by Mykola Leontovych (for 3 banduras)

== Recordings ==
- "Bandura and Song" – featuring bandura quartet and guitarist Victor Marshall. Producer Peter Ilyk.
- "Songs of Volodymyr Ivasiuk" – sung by the Ivasiuk Ukrainian Folk Ensemble; accompaniment by the Sydney Bandurist Ensemble and Victor Burak on piano.

== Awards ==
- The Taras Shevchenko medal (Bronze) – (Spilka Vizvolenya Ykrayini 1986) for contribution to music in Australia
- The Taras Shevchenko medal (Gold) – (Spilka Vizvolenya Ykrayini 1988) for contribution to music in the diaspora
- The Kozak Cross of Glory (Bronze) – (Free Kozaks of Australia) for service to the community
- The Kozak Cross of Glory (Silver) – (Free Kozaks of Australia) for service to the community
- The Kozak Cross of Glory (Gold) first order – (Free Kozaks of Australia 2005) – for service to the community
- The Kozak Cross of Glory (Gold) second order – (Free Kozaks of Australia 2008) – for service to the community
- The AFUO medal (Silver) – (Australian Federation of Ukrainian Organisations 1983?) for service to the community in the arts
- The AFUO medal (Gold) – (Australian Federation of Ukrainian Organisations 1988) for service to the community in the arts
- Citation for contribution to art of bandura in diaspora – (Ukraine 2008) Rivne, National Kobzar's Union
- Patriarchal citation for service to the Orthodox Church of the Kyivan Patriarchate in the diaspora – Awarded by Metropolitan Dimitri 2010.

== Sources ==
- Новий обрій ("The New Horizon") No. 4 1971 – Melbourne 1971 – Melbourne Literary-Cultural Association
- Новий обрій ("The New Horizon") No. 5 1975 – Melbourne 1975 – Melbourne Literary-Cultural Association
- Новий обрій ("The New Horizon") No. 6 1980 – Melbourne 1980 – Melbourne Literary-Cultural Association ISBN 0-9595837-3-4
- The Free Thought – Ukrainian Newspaper, Sydney (Nov. 1969, Dec. 1969, Feb. 1970, Mar. 1970, Apr. 1970, July 1970, Aug. 1970, No. 339, Sep. 1970, No. 1097, Feb. 1971, Mar. 1971, No. 1125, No. 1126, No. 1139, Sep. 1971, No. 1155, No. 1176, June 1972, Aug. 1972, No. 1163, No. 392, No. 1128, No. 1152, Nov. 1972, No. 1495, No. 1498, No. 1503 No. 1693–94, No. 1546, No. 1548, No.1542–42)
- Church and Life – Ukrainian News press, Melbourne (No. 112, No. 437, No. 474, No. 482, Mar. 1979)
- Ukrainians in Australia, Ukrainian News Press – Melbourne (563)
- Free World – News Press Winnipeg, May 1971
- Artforce Magazine – publication of Australian Arts Council
- Dutchak V. – "Deriazhny Petro" / Ukrainian Music Encyclopedia, Academy of Sciences of Ukraine, Kyiv, 2006, vol. 1, p. 601
