= Agustín Hernández Navarro =

Mexican architect and sculptor (1924–2022)

Agustín Hernández Navarro (February 29, 1924 – November 10, 2022) was a Mexican sculptor, poet, and architect recognized for his monumental futuristic buildings. His innovative design style garnered a multitude of awards and accolades in Mexico and internationally.

== Biography ==
Navarro was born in Mexico City on February 29, 1924. His brother is the architect Lamberto Hernández, and his sister is the choreographer Amalia Hernández. He also has two other sisters. He is the son of politician Lamberto Hernández and mother Amalia Navarro. At a young age, his mother exposed him to construction and building sites as a way of motivating him to pursuing a career in architecture. Inspired by the tradesmen who spoke about the inner workings of these sites, he became interested in mechanical and electrical materials and would dismantle and reassemble them to understand how they worked. As he matured, he took interest in mechanical and electrical engineering, however, his mother demanded that he followed in his older brother's footsteps to obtain a degree in architecture as she believed this career path would offer him financial independence. He reluctantly went on to study architecture at The National Autonomous University of Mexico and although he struggled though his first years of college he earned his degree in 1954. In the wake of overcoming his lack of desire to study in the field of architecture, Hernández Navarro also struggled against his professors who denounced his modern style of architecture. Despite these struggles his thesis project which featured a cultural center of modern art was highly praised by famed Mexican Artist Diego Rivera. Although his early entry into architecture was facilitated by his mother Amalia, Hernández Navarro went on to become highly awarded in his field and known as one of Mexico's greatest modern architects. In addition to his architecture practice, Hernández Navarro was a college professor beginning in 2001 until he took ill in 2002. He was former Vice-President of The Mexican Academy of Architecture and associated member of The American Institute of Architecture. He has been Emeritus Academic number I of the Academy of Architecture of the Society of Mexican Architects since 1983, and Emeritus Creator of the National System of Creators since 1994.

== Works ==
=== Architecture ===
From the 1960s onward, Hernández Navarro disregarded the popular architectural styles of his time in favour of creating futuristic and distinctly Mexican architectural forms. With the use of industrial materials such as concrete, he was able to achieve the construction of monumental structures which referenced a Pre-Columbian past. Although he claimed his buildings and sculptures did not adhere to a specific style, his innovative structures exhibit cohesive elements which evoke the symbiology and heritage of Pre-Columbian Mexico while demonstrating a unity of structure, form and function, with a modern flair. Hernández Navarro's sculptural forms were heavily influenced by Mesoamerican cosmogony in both the interior and exterior spaces he created and with exposed concrete as his preferred material, he captured the essence of Pre-Columbian edifices while producing innovative modern structures. Trained as a sculptor, in addition to being an architect, his architectural structures were informed by sculptural elements which were heavily influenced by his Mesoamerican heritage. Hernández Navarro believed that architecture should be seen as a historical bridge, and through symbolism and form one could defend their cultural identity.

Hernández Navarro has not described himself as adhering to one specific style of architecture, although some scholars have categorized his work as brutalism mixed with post modernism, while others say he is the father of emotional architecture which is best known as modern architecture that evokes an emotion or which is spiritually inspiring.

=== Poetry ===
In addition to sculpture and architecture, Hernández Navarro studied poetry and was a published writer. His textural work Gravity, Geometry and Symbolism was published in 1989 by UNAMAD and was a study of space and the interaction between light and dark.

== Notable public works ==
=== Folkloric Ballet School 1968–70 ===
The Folkloric Ballet School was founded by Agustín Hernández Navarro's choreographer sister Amalia Hernández and constructed in the Colony Guerrero, Mexico City. The structure which houses two rehearsal rooms, an office and a theatre, references the slope of a Pre-Columbian pyramid base while asserting itself as a modern piece of architecture.

=== Heroico Colegio Militar 1971–76 ===
The Heroico Colegio Militar or The Heroic Military College is Hernández Navarro most significant structure which is located just south of the Mexican capital. The imposing main building is constructed of concrete and blocky abstraction which bears resemblance to the Mayan rain God Chaac. The main building appears to guard the central square and the layout of the academy, while distinctly modern, harkens back to Pre-Columbian city planning as found at Teotihuaćan and Monte Albán. Hernández Navarro considered General Cuenca, whom he designed The Heroico Colegio Militar for, his favorite client because he was given complete creative freedom throughout the process. He also valued the project because he believed that working with military personnel obligated him to develop a stronger authoritative voice when leading large operations.

=== Meditation Centre of Cuernavaca 1984 ===
The Meditation Centre of Cuernavaca was a monument to the Mexican state with one of its buildings resembling the Aztec feathered serpent god Quetzalcoatl. According to Mexican art historian Beatriz de la Fuente, this project makes evident Hernández's capacity to abstract and revitalize the geometric motives present in pre-hispanic art and architecture.

=== Calakmul Coronado 1994 ===
Calakmul Coronado is a modern structure created using bi-axial symmetry and is known locally as La Lavadora or The Washing Machine because of its iconic boxy frame with an enormous inset circular window. The building in Santa Fe, Mexico was originally built as a government building but now houses the Dutch embassy. Hernández Navarro considered Calakmul Coronado his favorite project because its uniqueness and he believed it reflected his design philosophy.

== Notable private works ==
=== Praxis 1975 ===
Gravity defying Praxis is an engineering feat categorized as brutalist in style. With the base as a vertical single column, the pedestal houses Hernández Navarro's studio at the top. The structure is held together by colossal concrete and marble slabs which fit together as was in the Pre-Hispanic Tau style. The structure features a floating bridge between the trees which serves as the entrance and the interior challenges the conventional idea that diagonal walls are a waste of space which intentionally evokes a feeling of vertigo.

=== La Casa en el Aire 1991 ===
La Casa en el Aire or The House in the Air is a gravity defying structure located in the Bosques de las Lomas area of Mexico City. With the main hall built at a 45 degree tilt that is suspended in air, the building makes use of the surrounding steep terrain by veiling the garages and service areas with the surrounding slope. The structure is constructed with concrete slabs and steel cantilevers which mimic a levitated snake like shape. With this project, Hernández Navarro sought to merge the space of the edifice with the air rather than with the soil of the Earth.

== Death ==
Agustín Hernández Navarro died November 10, 2022, in Mexico City, Mexico. His son Roberto Hernández reported that, after a 20-day stay at the hospital, his father died at the age of 98.

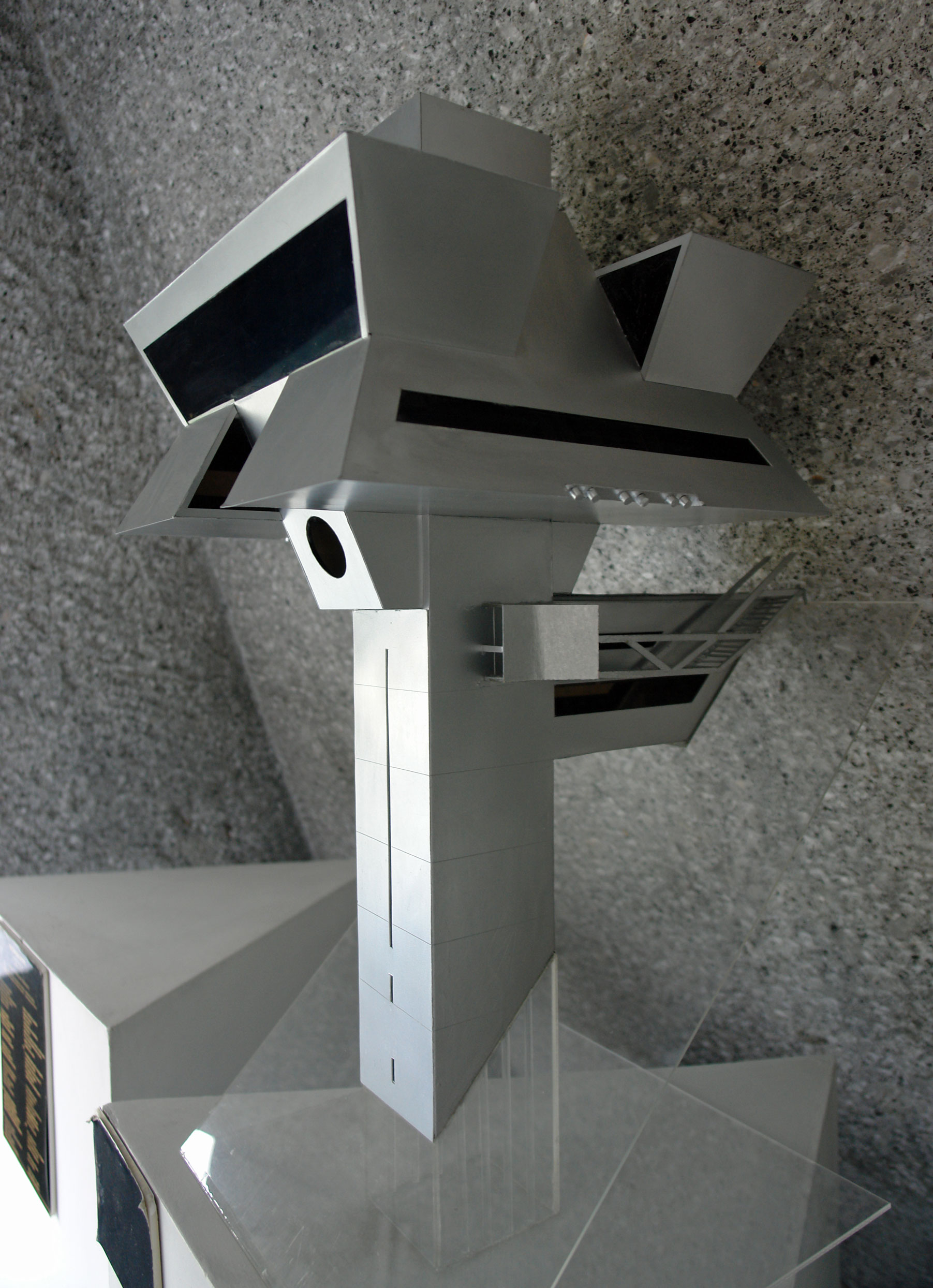
Model of 'Praxis', the Architect's Studio in Mexico City

== Major works ==
- 1968, Folkloric Ballet School, Mexico City
- 1970, Praxis - Casa Hernández, Mexico City
- 1970, Mexican Pavilion, Osaka Expo, Japan
- 1974, Hospital Center IMSS, Mexico
- 1976, Heroic Military College, Mexico
- 1984, Meditation Center, Cuernavaca
- 1991, "House in the Air", Mexico City
- 1997, Calakmul Corporate Building, Santa Fe, Mexico City
- 2005, State of Mexico University, Toluca, State of Mexico

== Prizes and awards ==
His works have won national and international recognition such as:

- First prize for the Mexico Pavilion in Osaka, Japan
- Gold Medal at the Second Biennial of Mexican Architecture
- First prize for Professional Practice from the Federation of the College of Architects of Mexico
- The First Urban Land Institute Prize in Washington DC
- 1987 Presea III Biennale of Architecture, in Sofia, Bulgaria
- 1989 Presea Biennial, Buenos Aires, Argentina
- 1990 1st. Gold Medal Award II Mexican Architecture Biennale
- 1996 1st. First National Steel Prize AHMSA, National Award IMEI to the Intelligent Building of the Corporate Calakmul
- 1999 National Award for Architecture
- 2004 National Award in Science and Arts
- 2003 National Arts Award
- 2006 XI Triennial Gold Medal Interarch, in Sofia, Bulgaria,
- 2009 International Academy of Architecture Annual Prix, ¨Arcus House ¨, Sofia, Bulgaria
- 2009 World Triennial of Architecture, Special Prize Silver medal ¨Arcus House ¨, Sofia, Bulgaria
- 2010 CEMEX Lifetime achievement award, Cementos Mexicanos, Monterrey Nl.
