= Ballet Folklórico de México =

Mexican folkloric ensemble

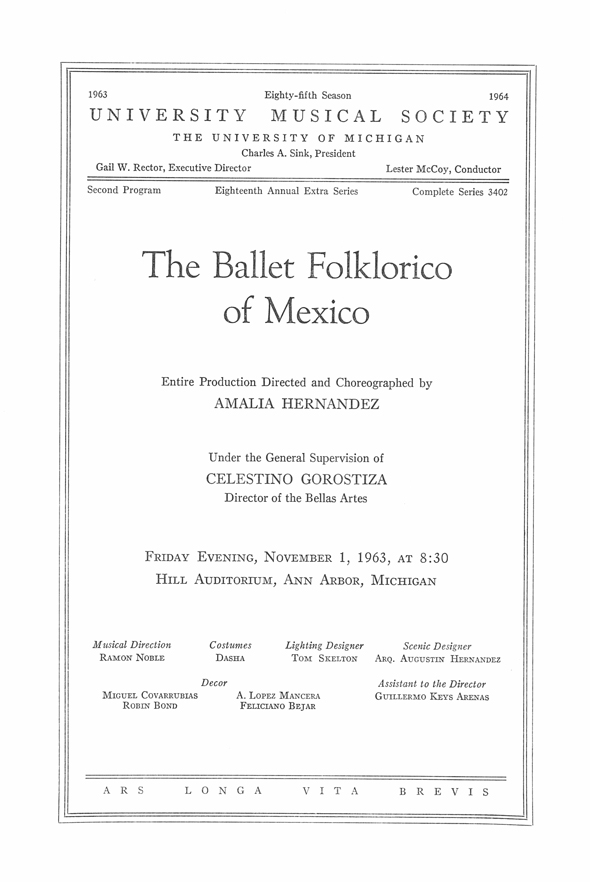
Concert program cover of performance of the ballet at the University of Michigan in 1963

Ballet Folklórico de México is a Mexican folkloric ensemble in Mexico City. For six decades, it has presented dances in costumes reflecting the traditional culture of Mexico. The ensemble has appeared under the name Ballet Folklórico de México de Amalia Hernández.

== History ==
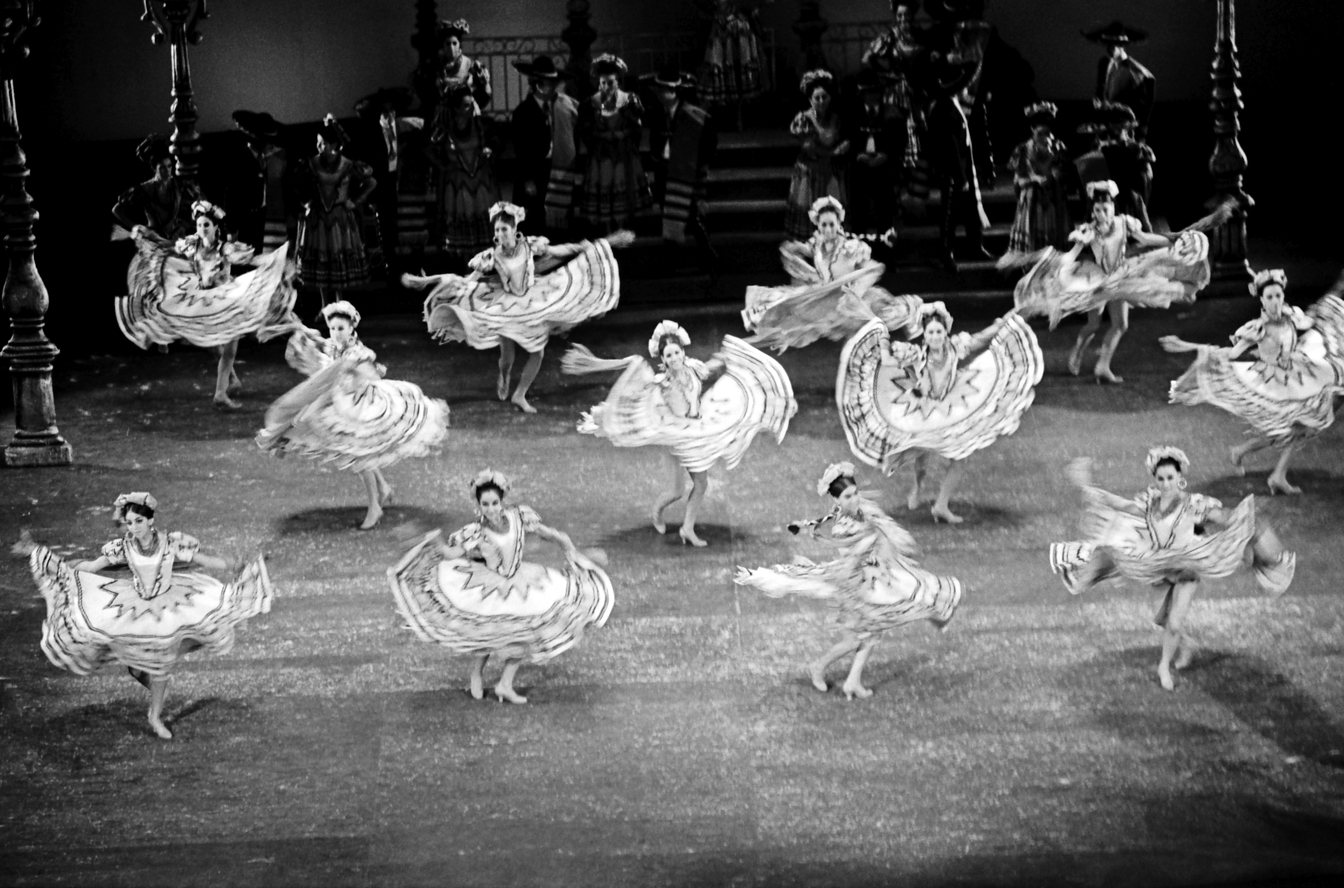
Ballet Folkorico de Mexico 1970.

From the group's founding by Amalia Hernández in 1952, the group grew from eight performers to a fifty-piece ensemble by the decade's end. In 1959, the group officially represented Mexico at the Pan American Games in Chicago, United States. In 1963 Guillermo Keys-Arenas was the Assistant to the Director of Ballet Folklórico de México, while in 1969 he was its Artistic Coordinator.

== Performances ==
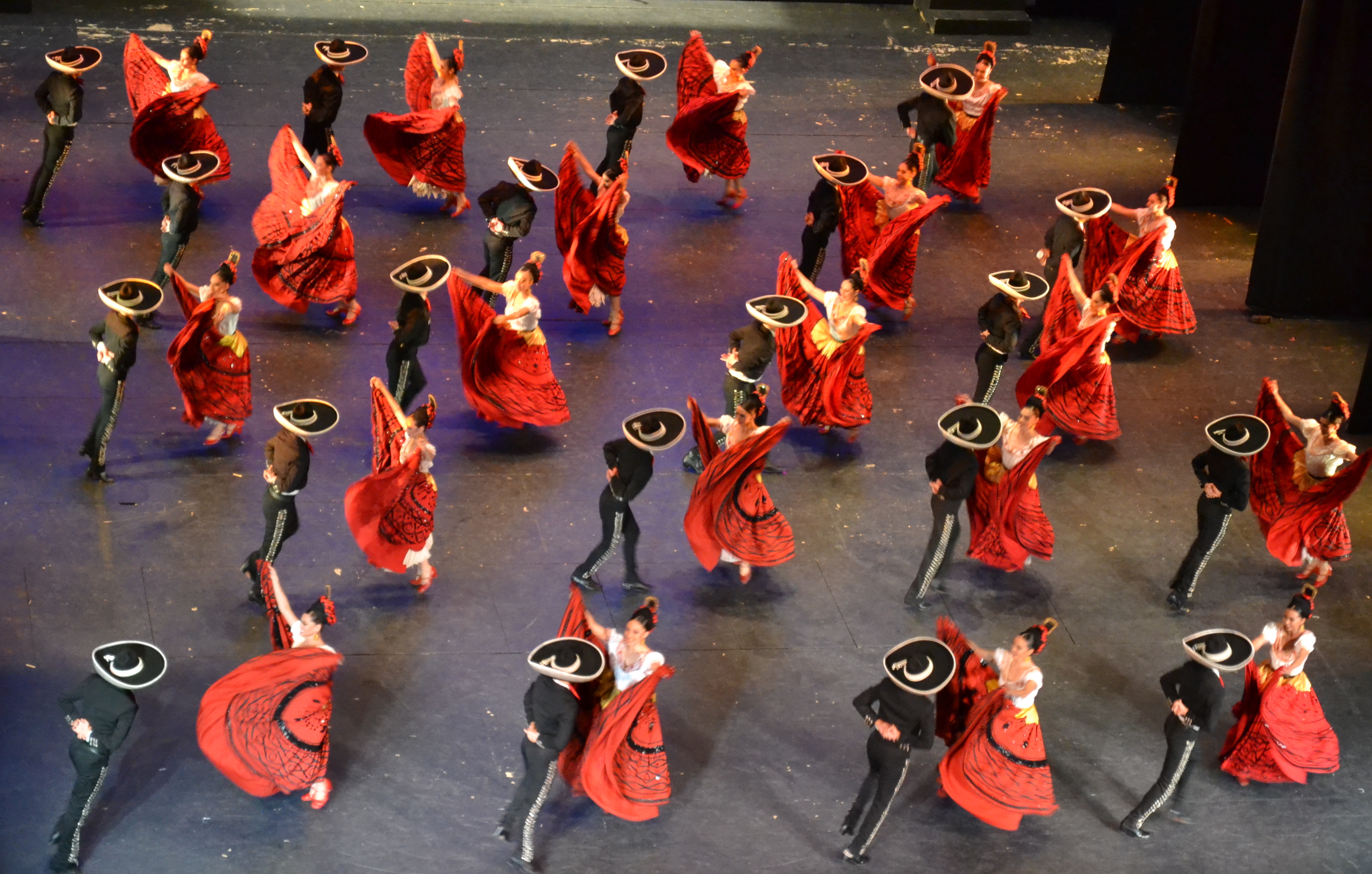
Ballet Folklórico de México. (Palacio de Bellas Artes, 2016)

The music and dances reflect various regions of Mexico. Many of the ensemble's works reflect the traditions of indigenous Mesoamerican culture. The number of performers in individual dance ranges from two to over thirty-five. Under Amalia Hernández, the group pioneered Mexican folk dance. It is practiced by many people in America as well as Mexico.

The ensemble performs three times weekly at the Palace of Fine Arts in Mexico City. Additionally, it has toured widely in the United States and has appeared in over 80 other countries.

== Recording ==
In 1963, the ensemble issued a 'Living Stereo' LP record, Ballet Folklórico de México, on RCA Records of Mexico. Songs on LP record include: Flor De Piña, El Sapo, and El Patito.

== Similar ensembles ==
Ballet Folklórico Mexicano Ollimpaxqui, Ballet Folklórico Puro México (based in Toronto, Ontario, Canada) and Grupo Folklórico Cotzal de Acuña in Ciudad Acuña also present performances of traditional Mexican dances. Some alumni from Ballet Folklórico México are members of these ensembles.

== See also ==
- Baile Folklórico
- Music of Mexico
- List of folk dance performance groups
- Madera Folklorico
