= Baile folklórico =

Collective term for traditional Mexican dances

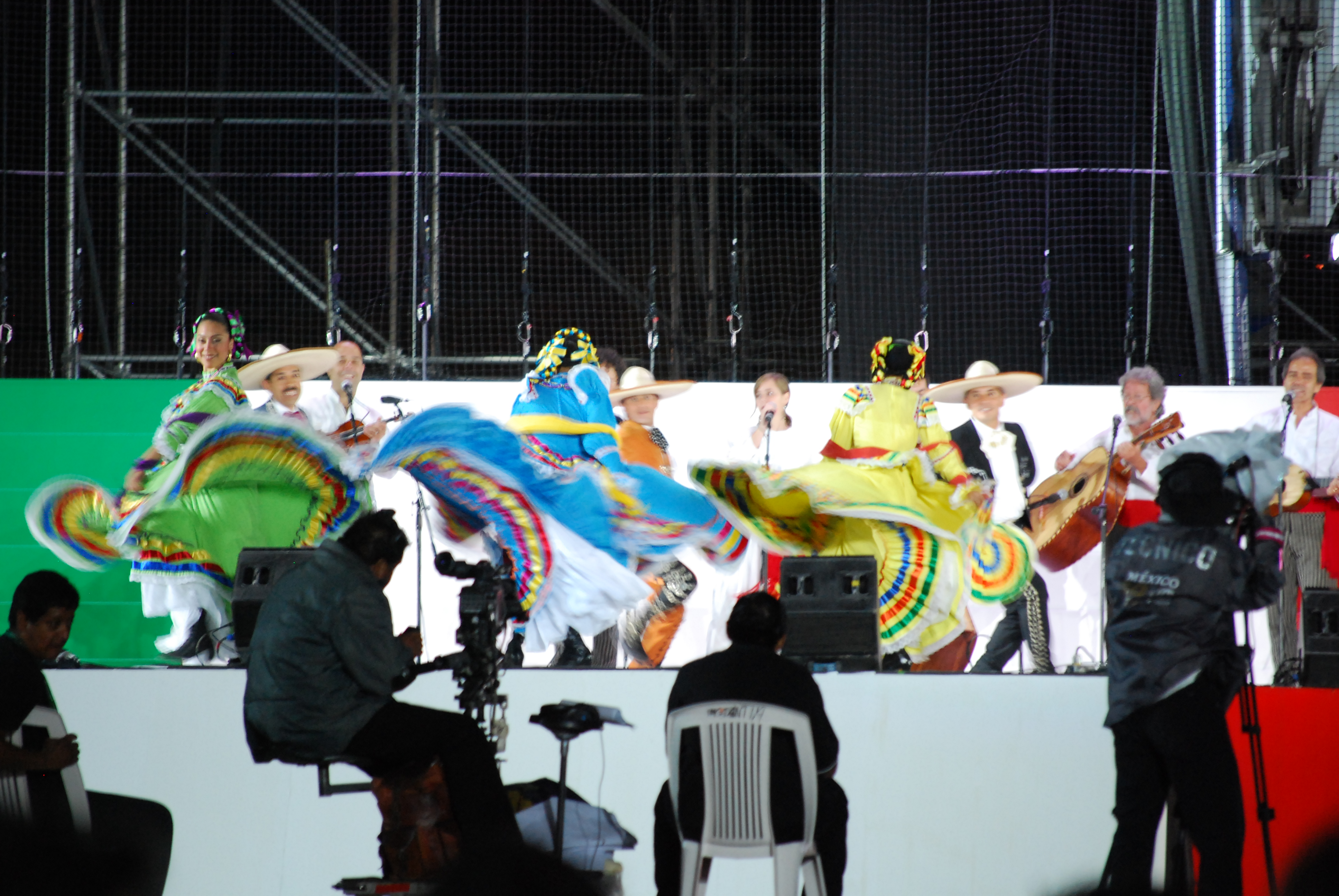
Ballet folklórico at the Celebration of Mexican political anniversaries in 2010

Baile folklórico, "folkloric dance" in Spanish, also known as ballet folklórico, is a collective term for traditional cultural dances that emphasize local folk culture with ballet characteristics – pointed toes, exaggerated movements, highly choreographed. Baile folklórico differs from danzas and regional bailes. Although it has some association from "danzas nationalists". Folk dances", that is, "dances that you will find in the villages, not on stage" were researched and disseminated by Alura Angeles de Flores. Each region in Mexico, the Southwestern United States and Central American countries is known for a handful of locally characteristic dances.

== Mexico ==
=== Dances ===
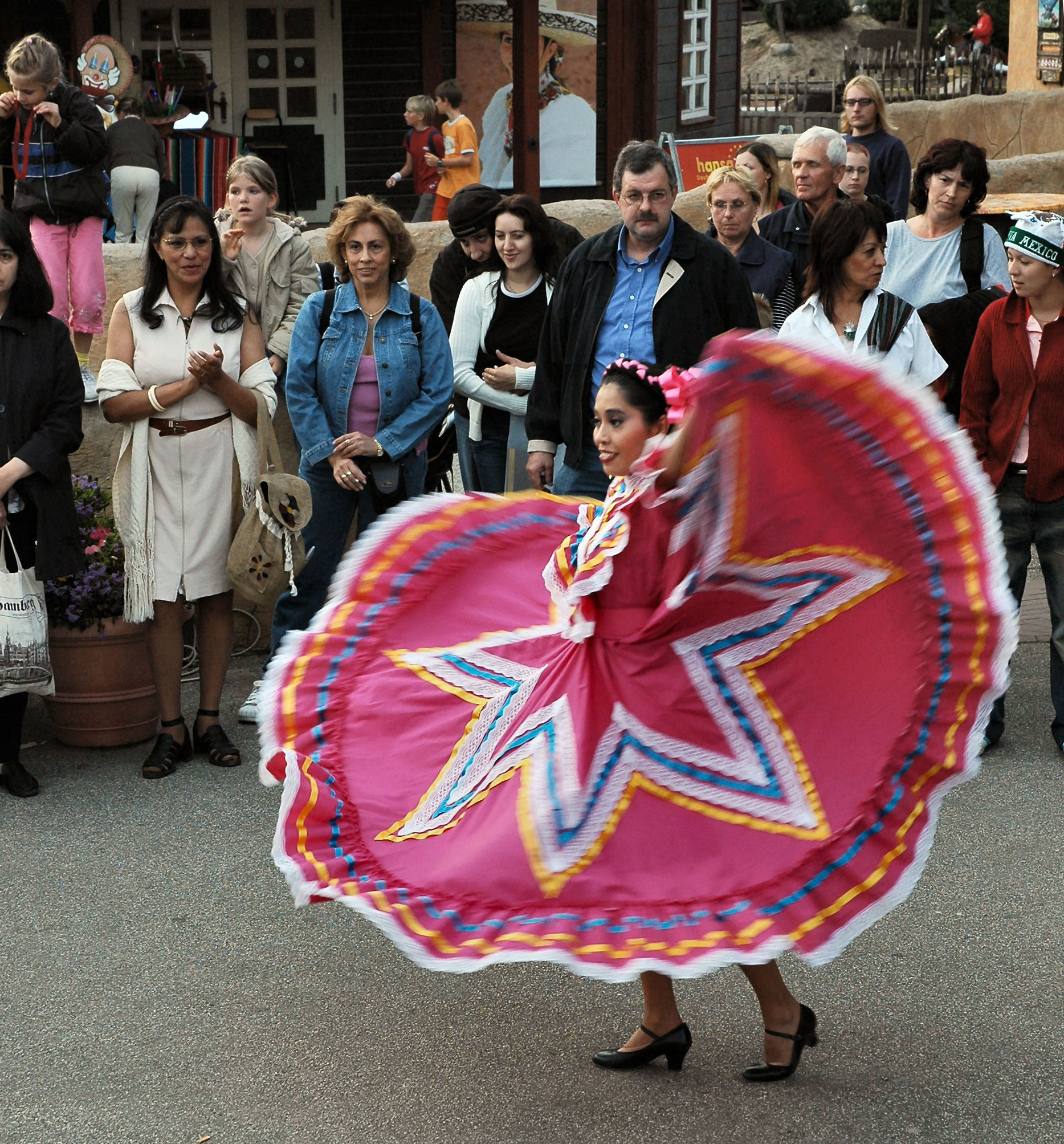
A woman dancing folklórico in the traditional dress of Jalisco

In the state of Jalisco, its Jarabe Tapatio, or "hat dance", while the son and El baile de los sonajeros are famous dances which accompany the mariachi; one of the most popular songs is "El Son de la Negra" (1940). The state of Guerrero is known for its sintesis and tixtla. Michoacán is known for its huetamo and Historia del Traje de la Mujer Michoacana (lit. "Story of the Michoacán Woman's Dress"), a dance which depicts a local folktale, Alegria (1995). Though the dances differ from region-to-region, the basic steps and style of dance are similar. Traditional bailes in the majority of regions of Mexico are characterized by a basic set of steps called zapateados, which involve percussive heel-stomping. The influences from flamenco hardshoe dancing can be clearly seen here. At some events, people dancing zapateado will simply dance on a wooden board, table, or plank, if no hard floor is available, not unlike the Irish sean-nós (or "old style") dance, another possible influence on the dances of both Spain and Mexico.

=== Costumes ===
Costumes in the southwest United States are characterized by denim and western shirts while costumes of the Federal District of Mexico reflect a stronger traditional Spanish influence and those of the Yucatán reflect indigenous traditions. In the folk dances of Northern Mexico, men generally wear black pants with galas on each side of the leg, accented with a red tie and belt and a black wide-brimmed hat.

The women wear tighter fitting and shorter skirts and either white or black boots. The costumes from Jalisco require the women to wear brightly colored ruffled skirts trimmed with ribbons whose colors are local signifiers, shoes with heavy clog-like heels and ornate hair pieces. Shoes vary in color but usually they are either black, white, or red, depending on the song and region. For the region of Veracruz, the women wear white dresses that are full of lace. They use white shoes, and a small apron with a bandana that hangs off the side of the dress.

Whether the woman is married or not determines what side the bandana will hang and which side the floral head piece will lie. Married women wear it the bandana on the left side and, single women it hang on the right.

Sinaloan women, from the coastal region, wear lighter and more colorful dresses. The people of the Americas typically wear darker colors as a show of mourning for the dead. When dancing ballet folklórico there is a different outfit that goes with each different state of Mexico.

Some dancing includes dancing with partners while others require using a bandana or fan, like the state of Guerrero and Veracruz. Oaxaca is most recognized for the detail in the embroidery of their dresses and the empowerment their costumes give woman from the attention to detail and extravagance. Heavy makeup for many regions is also heavily encouraged to resemble a doll.

=== States of Mexico with Baile Folklórico ===
- Aguascalientes
- Baja California
- Campeche
- Chiapas
- Chihuahua
- Coahuila
- Colima
- Durango
- Guanajuato
- Guerrero
- Hidalgo
- Jalisco
- Michoacán
- Nayarit
- Nuevo León
- Oaxaca
- Puebla
- Querétaro
- Quintana Roo
- San Luis Potosí
- Sinaloa
- Sonora
- Tabasco
- Tamaulipas
- Tlaxcala
- Veracruz
- Yucatán
- Zacatecas

=== Popularity ===
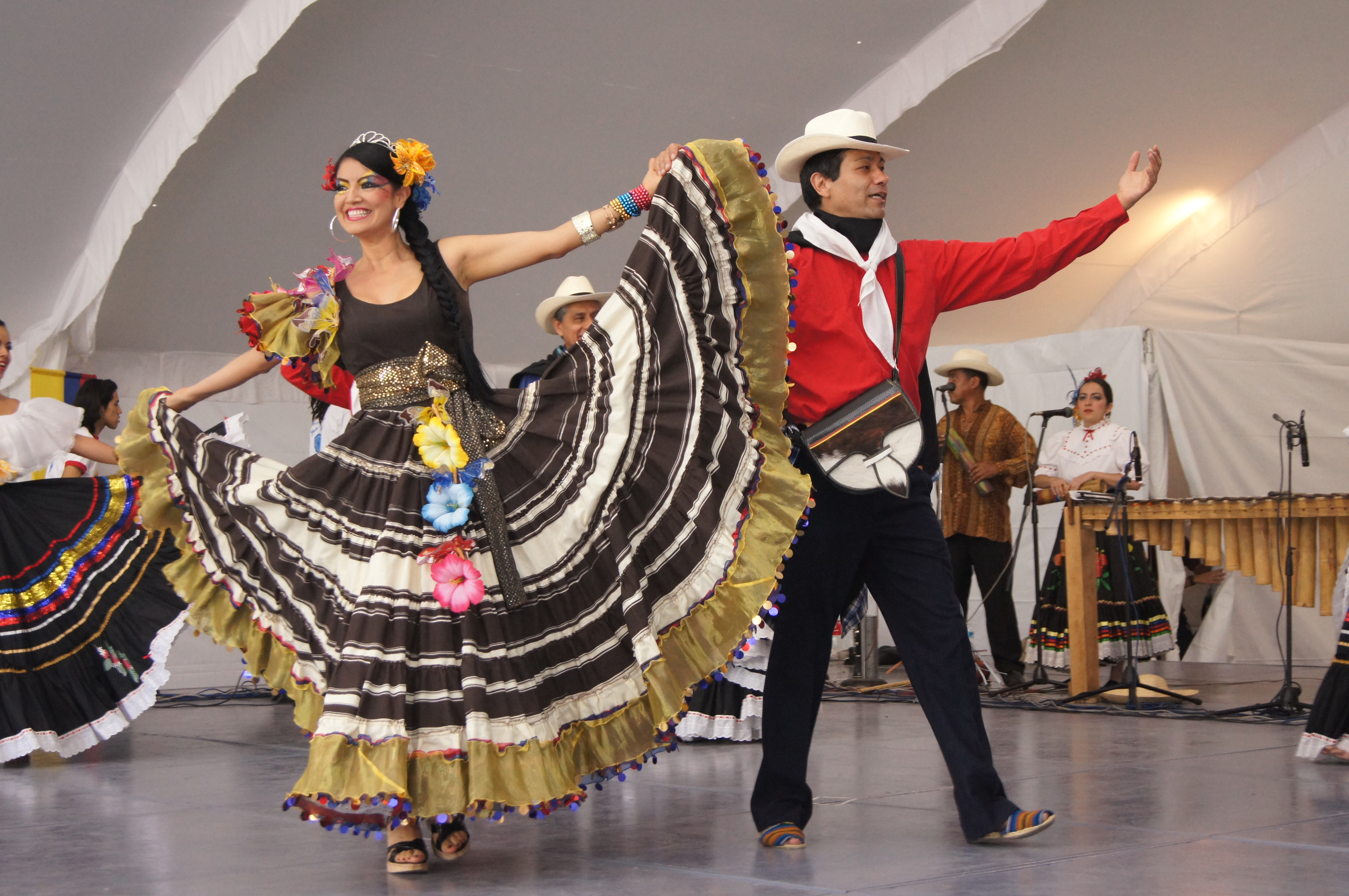
Exhibition of Colombian baile folklorico at the Monterrey Institute of Technology and Higher Education, Mexico City

Amalia Hernandez pioneered baile folklorico in the 1950s with her establishment and leadership of the Ballet Folklórico de México. Additionally, she founded a school in Mexico City for the study and practice of classical and folkloric dance techniques.

Prior to its rise in popularity among student and community groups, bailes folklóricos were (and currently are) performed as a part of large parties or community events. The mariachi musicians generally stand in a line at the back of the performance space and perform without written musical notation, while the dancers perform in couples in front of the mariachis. Nowadays there are both private and public Folklorico groups that get together and compete, for example the USA Ballet Folklorico Nationals.

=== Amalia Hernandez, mestizaje and national identity ===
Mestizaje refers to the process of racial and cultural mixing between Europeans, Indigenous peoples, and enslaved individuals that began during the colonization of the Americas by Spanish and Portuguese colonizers. In Mexico, there have been attempts at using Mestizaje to create a national identity through art, music, and dance. Ballet Folklorico has also become a symbol of Mestizaje and the mixing of Spanish and Indigenous Mexican music and dance forms. This can be seen in its history and its formal elements such body movements, gestures, and dress.

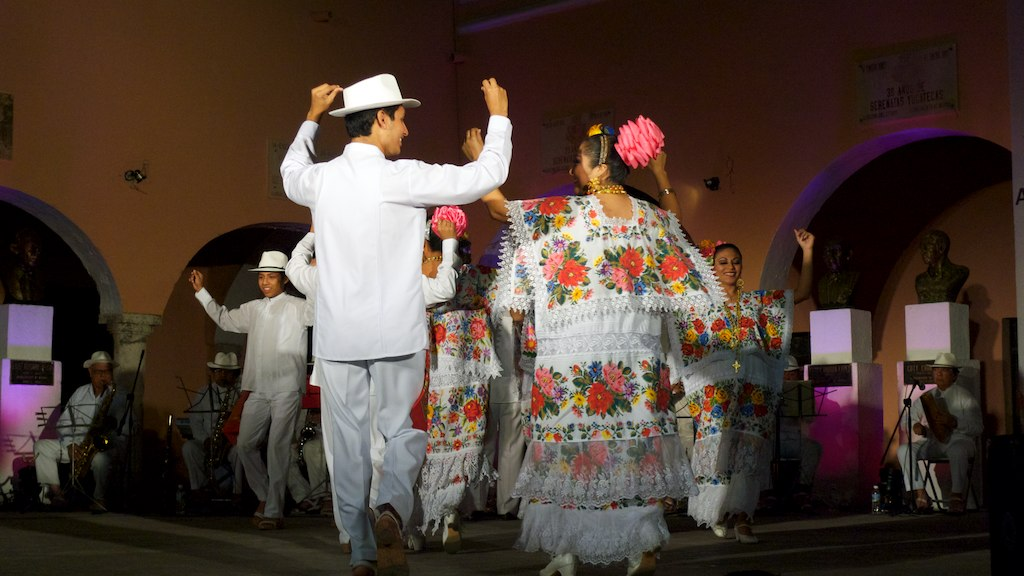
Jarana Yucateca dance

One example of this is in Ballet Folklorico of Mexico (founded by Amalia Hernandez, a self-identified Mestiza). In one program, they noted: "It is in the mestizaje of the indigenous and the Spanish where one will find one of the essential traits of the mexican people: A whole series of expressions are colored by their own vigorous style." The company, like many other folkloric Mexican dance companies draw on indigenous dances and "remodel" them with their own style and for stage performance. In the case of Ballet Folklorico, that involves western techniques brought in through Amalia Hernandez, whose own upbringing and dance education was multicultural and international. She learned ballet from Russian and French teachers and "studied indigenous and regional Mexican dance, tap, modern" and other dance forms. She was sent to the United States to learn English, and finished her formal dance education at Mexico's National School of Dance. She created Ballet Folklorico of Mexico in an attempt to create "her own concept of nationalist dance." Hernandez's personal history cannot be disregarded in the consideration of Ballet Folklorico because she was such an influential figure in its history.

Some of the formal elements of Ballet Folklorico are derived from both Indigenous and colonial dance forms. For example, the charro suit and the zapateo, or foot stomping, both are influenced by Spanish dress and flamenco dance and are symbols of mestizaje. Some of the women's costumes utilize the high neck, also a symbol of colonial dress. The colors of the costumes and many of the dances' subjects are symbols of Indigenous communities and culture. Traditional Indigenous dance would not have been performed on the proscenium stage, therefore, Ballet Folklorico uses European theatrical conventions to modify Indigenous-based movement to function in a new cultural medium. Ballet Folklorico is a living history of colonisation and cross cultural art.

== Central America ==
Central America has many Bailes Folkloricos. One typical dance from Costa Rica is the Punto guanacasteco.

Honduras has very active folk dance programs in schools and communities with a series of regional and national dance festivals. These culminate at the end of October in a festival, called El Grande de Grandes, that attracts over 50 groups and more than 1000 dancers to La Esperanza, Intibucá, from many different communities in Honduras. Many different traditional dances have been documented in the cities, towns, villages and hamlets of Honduras. These are certified authentic and cataloged in the library of the National Office of Folklore of Honduras. The folkloric dances of Honduras incorporate elements of the indigenous, European and African ancestry fused in the Honduran culture. The mix includes dances that have originated locally as well as dances that have been brought by people from surrounding countries and regions. Reflecting both history and culture, Honduran folk traditions accompany and represent significant events in peoples' lives. Since the 1950s, folklorists starting with Rafael Manzanares Aguilar have documented about 150 traditional dances and the costumes and music that have accompanied them in the communities from which they originated. The National Office of Folklore is part of the Ministry of Public Education. These are broadly categorized as colonial, mestizo, indigenous (or campesino), and Garifuna, reflecting the primary cultural influence of a particular dance. The costumes fall into similar categories.
