= Teatro de los Insurgentes =

Theatre in Mexico City

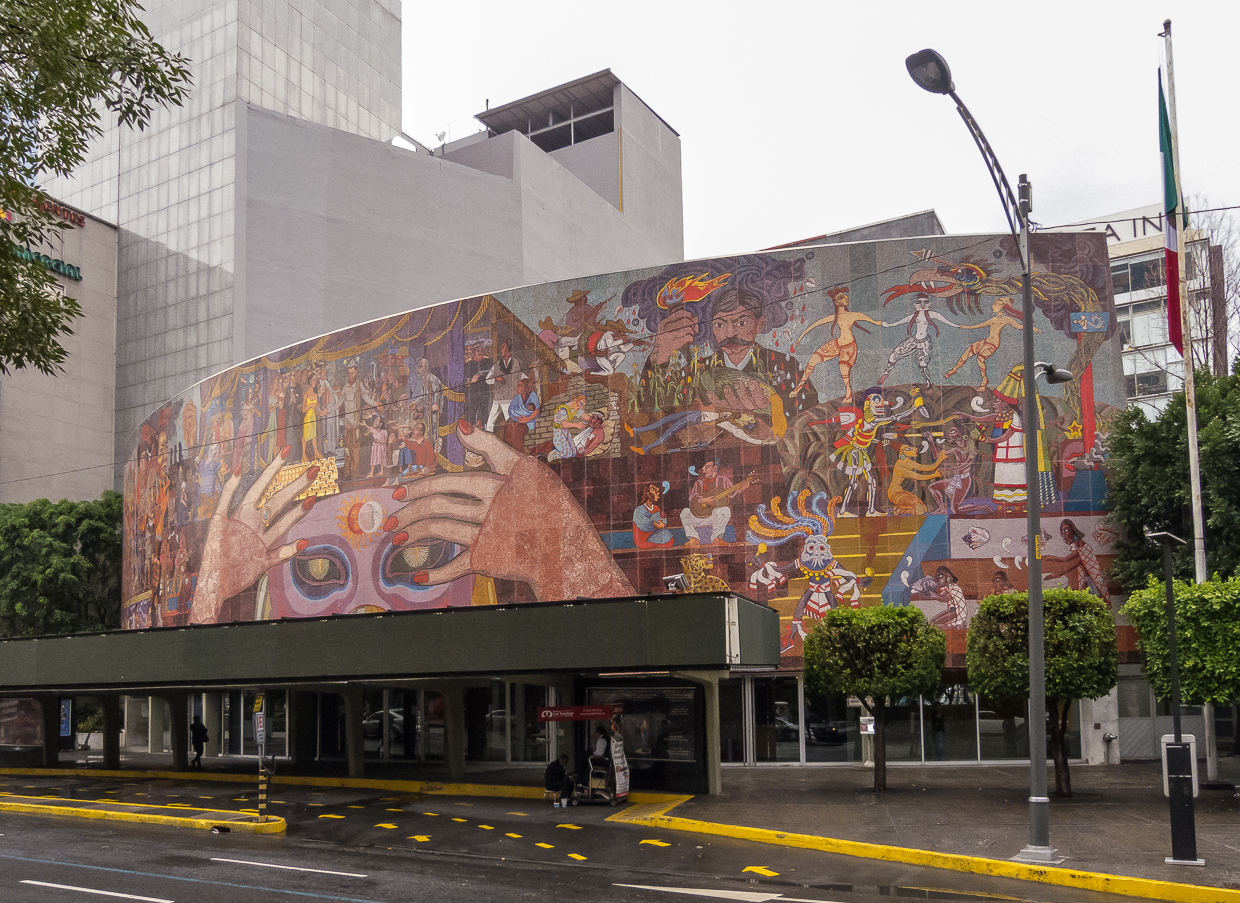
- Exterior of the theatre in 2014
- Interactive map of Teatro de los Insurgentes
- Location: San José Insurgentes, Benito Juárez, Mexico City
- Coordinates: 19°21′51″N 99°10′56″W
- Owner: Televisa
- Operator: Ticketmaster
- Capacity: 959
- Type: Theater
- Public transit: Teatro Insurgentes

Construction
- Built: 1953
- Opened: 3 April 1953
- Architect: Alejandro Prieto

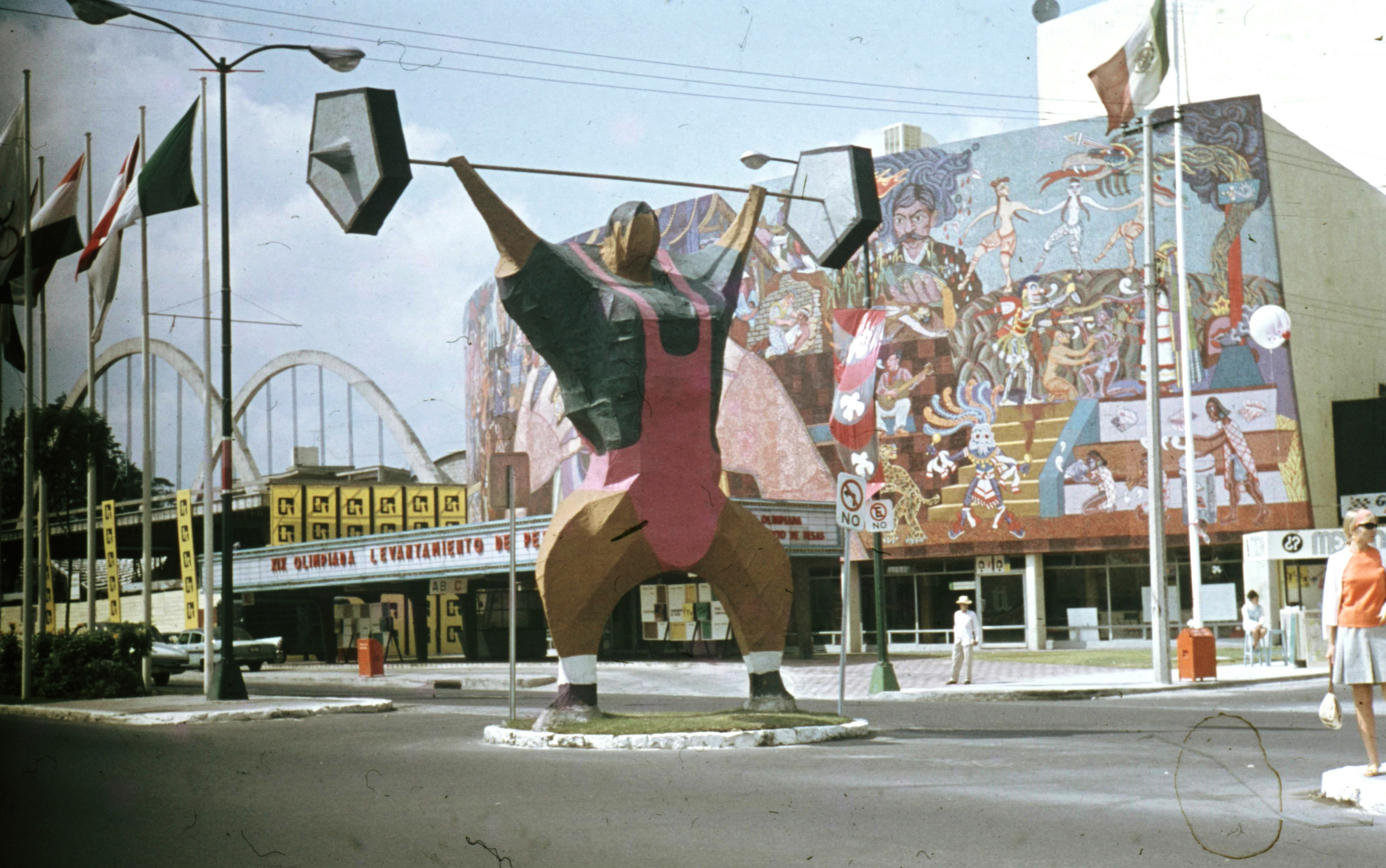
Teatro de los Insurgentes during the 1968 Summer Olympics

Teatro de los Insurgentes (English: Theater of the Insurgents) is a theater located on Mexico City's Avenida de los Insurgentes. Opened in 1953, the theater seats 959 spectators.

== History ==
The construction of Teatro de los Insurgentes was funded by José María Dávila in 1953 as part of President Miguel Alemán's program of urban renewal. Architect Alejandro Prieto, chosen by Dávila, was in charge of designing the theater. Dávila commissioned muralist Diego Rivera to paint La historia del teatro, a visual history of the theatre in Mexico on the building's façade. The Marxist artist placed the character of Cantinflas in the center of the mural in the form of a Robin Hood figure, distributing the wealth of the rich to the poor. The mural also references Mexican historical characters like Miguel Hidalgo or José María Morelos.

The theater's inaugural performance was Cantinflas' elaborate return to the stage after considerable success in films. The work, Yo, Colón, placed Cantinflas in the role of the Paseo de la Reforma statue of Christopher Columbus, who came to life and made candid "discoveries" about contemporary Mexican society. The play was written by Alfredo Robledo and Carlos León, Federico Ruiz was the music composer and Guillermo Keys-Arenas was in charge of choreographing the show.

In 2005, Rivera's mural was restored, funded by Televisa, owner of the theater.

== Events ==
=== Theater ===
In 1974, Pippin made its Spanish-language debut at the theater. It was produced by Mexican pop singer Julissa, who also played Catherine. Also in the cast were Burt Rodríguez as Leading Player, Héctor Ortiz as Pippin, Guillermo Rivas as Charles, Anita Blanch as Berthe, and Jacqueline Voltaire as Fastrada.

In 1975 a version of Sugar was produced in the theater. It starred the singer Enrique Guzmán and the actors Héctor Bonilla, Chabelo and Sylvia Pasquel.

In 2022, the Mexican production of Network, featuring Daniel Giménez Cacho, Zuria Vega and Arturo Ríos, debuted in the theater.

=== Sports ===
Teatro de los Insurgentes was one of the venues of the 1968 Summer Olympics, hosting the weightlifting competitions. In order to host the Olympics, some modifications were made to the theater: a gym was built inside the theater as well as bathrooms, a sauna room and individual locker rooms for the competitors. A giant sculpture of a weightlifter, nicknamed "Judas", was placed on the Avenida de los Insurgentes in front of the venue.

=== Music ===
American Latin rock band Santana played in the theater on 24 September 1973, as a part of their Caravanserai Tour.
