= Amalia Hernández =

Mexican folkloric choreographer

Amalia Hernández Navarro
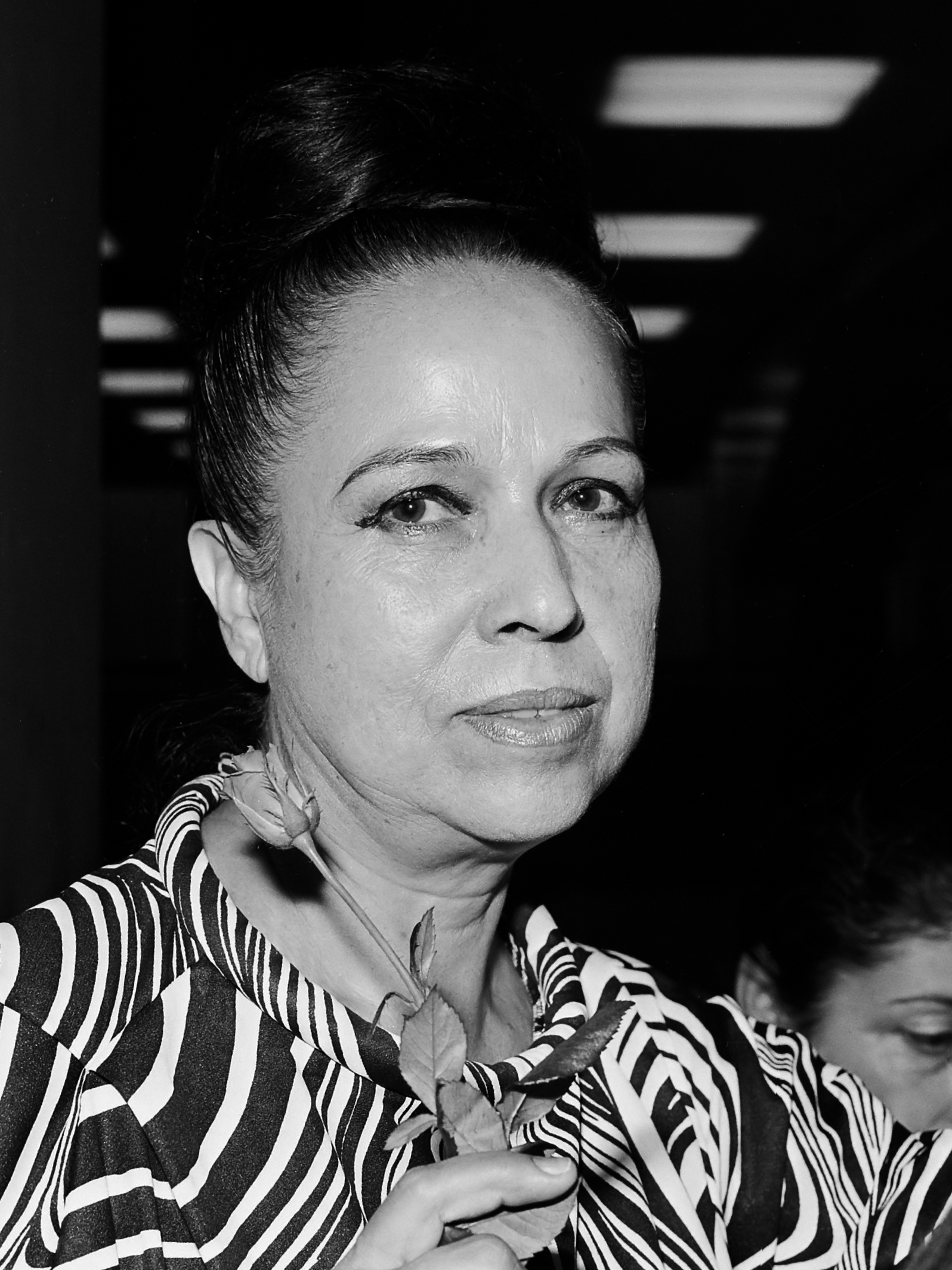
- Amalia Hernández (1973)
- Born: Amalia Hernández Navarro; September 19, 1917; Mexico City, Mexico
- Died: November 5, 2000 (aged 83); Mexico City, Mexico
- Occupation: Choreographer
- Years active: 1952-2000
- Relatives: Agustín Hernández Navarro (brother) Lamberto Hernández Navarro (brother)

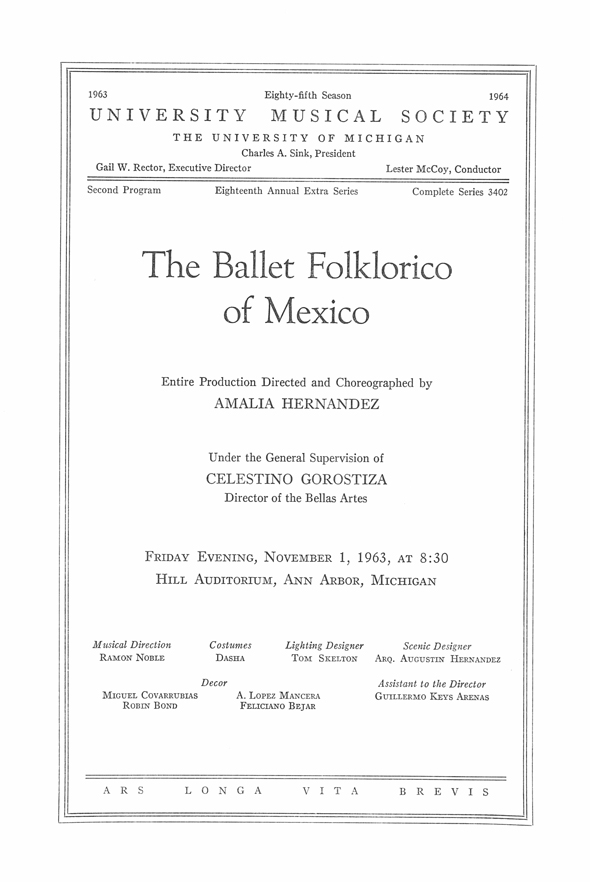
Concert program cover of performance of the Ballet Folklórico de México at the University of Michigan in 1963. Hernández is the director/choreographer.

Amalia Hernández Navarro (September 19, 1917 – November 4, 2000) was a Mexican ballet choreographer and founder of the Ballet Folklórico de México.

Hernández was born to the military officer and politician Lamberto Hernández and his wife Amalia Navarro.

She was a pioneer in developing Baile Folklorico, and in 1952, Hernández founded the Mexican Folkloric Ballet with only 8 dancers. By 1959, the ensemble had grown to 60 performers. It was commissioned to represent Mexico at the Pan American Games in Chicago, Illinois, in 1959. Hernández created over 60 choreographies in her lifetime.

Since 1960, Hernández's Ballet Folklórico de México has performed without interruption Sunday mornings and Wednesday evenings at the Palace of Fine Arts in Mexico City.

Additionally, she founded the Folkloric Ballet School in Mexico City. Her brother, architect Agustín Hernández Navarro, designed the building in 1968.

== Biography ==
Born in Mexico City on September 19, 1917, Amalia Hernández grew up in a wealthy home as her father was a prominent businessman with military and political involvement. She has been known to credit her mother for her interest in the arts, explaining a childhood full of art, singing, and music lessons. Her parents encouraged her interest in dance, her father going so far as to build a studio in their home. Her father was quoted as saying, "... there is no other alternative but to accept the career Amalia was born to have".

At the age of 17, she entered the National School of Dance directed by Nellie Campobello, which marked the beginning of Amalia's serious involvement in dance. After some conflicts with the director of the school, however, Hernández dropped out and consequently married, effectively putting her career on hold for a short while. Ultimately, the call of dance was too strong, for she began to work at the Fine Arts National Institute as a teacher and choreographer of modern dance.

She was unsatisfied and unfulfilled with her dancing, however, unable to connect with modern and European dance: "her cross-breed feeling, her contemporary mexicanism, vibrated with the half-breed's resonance, already defined and on the surface of the colorful México." She turned to traditional, cultural dances of Mexico, and thus began her involvement with baile folklorico.

Hernández died on November 5, 2000, in Mexico City, aged 83.

== Ballet Folklorico de Mexico ==
Hernández founded the dance company Ballet Folklórico de México in 1952, choosing to branch out with her experience and follow her own specific creative path. The group was small, consisting of only eight members in the beginning, and for their debut, Hernández presented the now-famous Melodies of Michoacan. In 1954, the chance to perform on television presented itself in the form of the Funcion de Gala program.

This is when the momentum began to truly pick up, the group performing a new dance every weekly broadcast. Success was garnered, and Hernández not only became director; the group expanded to twenty members by the end of the 67 episode run. With that small amount of success came recognition, and Hernández's company gained the attention of the department of tourism. The government endorsed her group, aiding her in touring North America in representation of Mexico, the results absolutely positive. By 1959, the group had grown to sixty members and was commissioned to participate in the Pan American Games in Chicago on behalf of Mexico.

Being catapulted onto the national stage, Hernández and the company only worked harder, creating 40 different dances in the 1960s alone. Following from there, her prominence as a cultural icon was only cemented further, as she went to choreograph about 70 dances, with performances around the world. In fact, the company has "performed more than 15,000 times for a total audience number of more than 22 million people", one of those performances being for John F. Kennedy during his presidency.

== Cultural significance and tribute ==
Hernández was always vocal about her love for her native Mexico, but she was careful to place significance upon Mesoamerican cultures, highlighting them when possible through her dancing. Her goal was to convey the diversity of Mexico, while also exploring pre-Columbian culture and traditions. She became a symbol for Mexicanidad, her pursuit of indigenous inclusionary dance an indication of her dedication to the presentation of a realistic Mexican identity (i.e. not only Western-influenced).

Hernández's love of indigeneity has also cemented the indigenous image of Mexico around the world, a direct result of the company's world-wide presence. This has helped recognize the unique Mexican culture, as well as promote a sense of national pride in regards to folklorico dancing. Additionally, she did not shy away from regional differences, her dances focusing on specific geographical areas and cultural areas in Mexico in order to provide a diverse outlook of Mexico. For example, her most famous dances (Melodies of Michoacan, Deer Dance, Jalisco, Fandangos) all spotlight certain areas of Mexico, along with their cultural traditions.

On September 19, 2017, a Google Doodle was released to honor Hernández's 100th birthday.

== See also ==
- Baile Folklorico
- Culture of Mexico
- Ballet Folklorico de Mexico
