= PolArt =

Polish arts festival in Australia

- Genre: Major arts, theatre, music and cultural festival, Biennale
- Begins: Late December
- Ends: Early January
- Frequency: Tri-annually
- Location: Australia
- Years active: 50
- Inaugurated: 1975
- Participants: 1500 artists
- Attendance: 10,000+
- Website: pol.art

PolArt is an arts festival that celebrates the Polish cultural heritage of Polish Australians and New Zealanders by presenting the Polish arts. The festival is held every three years in a different state capital in Australia with the first being held in 1975. Events that take place during PolArt cover the artistic disciplines of dance, literature, music, theatre and visual arts.

== Overview of PolArt Festival ==
In the three years leading up to a festival, the host city establishes an organising committee, raises funds, prepares the program and facilitates the logistics for participating artists. The festival starts in late December and runs into January to allow participants the best opportunity to attend. Approximately 1,000 artists and entourage travel from around Australia and New Zealand to gather in the host city. Behind the scenes, participants have full cast rehearsals and social events throughout the festival. Tens of thousands, even hundreds of thousands of members of the public will attend festival events. Events are predominantly located in the heart of the host city for maximum accessibility and to be prominent in the host city’s entertainment calendar. Past festivals have featured events at iconic venues including the Sydney Opera House, Arts Centre Melbourne and Queensland Performing Arts Centre. Over the two weeks of the PolArt festival, there is a diverse range of events across all featured art disciplines.

== Overview of Arts ==
=== Folkloric Dancing ===
Polish Folk songs and dances form a distinctive unit within the wider field of international folklore and have evolved from ancient observations and traditions. The variety of Polish folkloric dances are a result of the characteristics of each region in Poland, such as environment and socio-economic status. Although they all have similar rhythms, they are unique throughout the different clothing and choreography due to the characteristics of each region. During PolArt, concerts are held, usually at notable venues, to showcase these folk dances from the different regions. Various folkloric dance groups from around Australia and New Zealand perform at these festivals with their repertoires. There are also folkloric workshops that the public can attend that can range from making a flower wreath (a ‘wianek’, typically worn as a headdress in folkloric dances) to learning the basics of folk dances.

=== Literature ===
Polish literature has a long and rich history not limited to the Polish language, spanning the full range of works across poetry, plays, dramas, letters, essays, historical accounts and more. These at times played a significant role in maintaining Polish identity and culture, such as the works of Adam Mickiewicz during the Partitions of Poland, and continue to feature prominently in the lives of people of Polish heritage. PolArt extends this to literature from local authors influenced by Polish culture, and shares this appreciation with all interested Australians and New Zealanders through book clubs, seminars, author panels and meet & greet functions.

=== Art ===
Art in Polish culture has evolved from pagan roots and incorporated a multiplicity of cultural influences by virtue of Poland being a trading crossroads for centuries that welcomed and integrated people of diverse cultures to its society. In contemporary art, Polish artists have played integral roles in the development of art forms such as murals by Nespoon and neons throughout the Cold War era that are preserved at a dedicated museum in Warsaw. Artworks are showcased throughout PolArt, whether at exhibitions in galleries or in public spaces. These artworks are created by Australian and New Zealand artists influenced by Polish culture and/or heritage. The exhibitions typically run throughout the duration of the festival but on occasion extend beyond the core festival dates to provide more viewing opportunities for festival visitors.

=== Theatre ===
Dramatic theatre is the staple of Polish theatre, however, other historic forms were notable at times, for example visual theatre that played a role in evading state censorship. Polish actors became renowned across continents, such as Helena Modjeska in both London and the United States. Polish-Australians continue this tradition and PolArt puts on plays and theatre shows throughout each festival. These plays include original pieces and historic items, some in Polish and others in English.

=== Music ===
Polish music has been an art form whose exemplars are world famous, including classical composer Frédéric Chopin, and that have influenced other European cultures such as the Polonaise that was adopted in the court of France. Music in Polish culture is inextricably linked with the national identity. Sir Pawel Edmund Strzelecki, a famed explorer in Australia, felt so connected to his culture through music that he composed Polonaises of his own, that over a century later was discovered and have had dances choreographed to their music. Music at PolArt is presented live in concert and in intimate performances, both traditional and contemporary, by musicians and vocalists from across Australia and New Zealand.

== History ==
PolArt started out as an initiative of the Federation of Polish Women in Australia and New Zealand, under the leadership of Mrs Zofia Krupska named ArtPol. The vision of the inaugural 1975 festival in Sydney was to celebrate Polish culture in Australia and New Zealand for the first- and second-generation Polish Australians and New Zealanders. The vision for today’s PolArt festivals remains the same as it was in 1975. In 1980, the second festival was held in Adelaide, South Australia and started the trend of the festival moving to a different state capital with each subsequent festival. Alongside the change of city for the festival in 1980, the name was changed from ArtPol to PolArt and the new name persisted. The organisers of the PolArt Festivals have been predominantly the folkloric song and dance groups as many of these groups have attended all or almost all the PolArt festivals since its inception in 1975, and the majority of art participants at PolArt came from these groups. It was these groups at the end of each festival who would determine which city would host the next PolArt festival. After the conclusion of the 2015 PolArt festival in Melbourne, Victoria, the leaders of the folklore song and dance groups decided to create an enduring association to ensure the PolArt festival could continue to celebrate Polish culture in Australia and New Zealand in collaboration with not only the dance groups but also other artistic organisations.

== List of past festivals ==
Festival	Dates	President/Chairperson	Notable Venues
ArtPol Sydney, 1975	1975/12/27 – 1976/01/01	Zofia Krupska	Sydney Opera House, USYD Union Theatre
PolArt Adelaide, 1980	1980/12/27 – 1981/01/04	Andrzej Szczygielski OAM	Royal S.A. Society of Arts Gallery, Her Majesty's Theatre, Adelaide
PolArt Melbourne, 1984	1983/12/27 – 1984/01/03	Jozef Kuszell OAM	Queens Hall, State Library of Victoria, National Theatre, Melbourne, THE AGE Gallery, Melbourne Concert Hall, Marian Shrine, St Patrick’s Cathedral
PolArt Brisbane, 1988	1988/12/27 – 1989/01/03	John Kuropka	Brisbane City Hall, Suncorp Theatre, Queensland Performing Arts Centre, Albert Park Ampi-Theatre
PolArt Sydney, 1991	1991/12/27 – 1992/01/04	Irena Wojak	International Convention Centre Sydney, Bankstown Civic Centre
PolArt Adelaide, 1994	1994/12/27 – 1995/01/05	Henryk Krzymuski OAM	Adelaide Festival Centre, Thebarton Theatre, Elder Park
PolArt Melbourne, 1997	1997/12/27 – 1998/01/04	Andrzej Soszyński	Melbourne Concert Hall
PolArt Brisbane, 2000	2000/12/27 – 2001/01/06	Henry Kurylewski	Queensland Performing Arts Centre, South Bank Parklands, Queensland Museum, ‘Polonia’ – The Polish Club
PolArt Sydney, 2003	2003/12/27 – 2004/01/06	Ania Kulesz	Sydney Opera House, Sydney Town Hall, Riverside Theatres Parramatta, St Mary’s Cathedral, Argyle Centre Gallery, Stables Theatre, Sydney, Bankstown Sports Club
PolArt Hobart, 2006	2006/12/27 – 2007/01/03	Tomek Prokop	Federation Concert hall, Theatre Royal, Town Hall, Tasmanian Museum, Art Gallery Bond Store Gallery
PolArt Adelaide, 2009	2009/12/27 – 2010/01/10	Andrew Munk	Adelaide Festival Centre, Elder Park, Elder Hall, The Parks Community Centre
PolArt Perth, 2012	2012/12/27 – 2013/01/06	Andy Sierakowski	Perth Cultural Centre, Hackett Hall, Western Australian Museum, Studio Underground, State Theatre Centre of Western Australia, Perth Concert Hall
PolArt Melbourne, 2015	2015/12/27 – 2016/01/03	Jan Szuba OAM	Arts Centre Melbourne, Drum Theatre, Clocktower Centre, Ruby’s Music Room, Melbourne Town Hall
PolArt Brisbane, 2018	2018/12/27 – 2019/01/06	Chris Dutkowski/Henry Kurylewski	Queensland Performing Arts Centre, Redlands Performing Arts Centre, State Library of Queensland
PolArt Sydney, 2022	2022/12/26 – 2023/01/06	Agatha Satala	The Concourse, Riverside Theatres Parramatta, International Convention Centre Sydney, Sydney Town Hall, Bankstown Polish Club

=== Total of Hosting Cities ===
City	No. Festivals	Years Hosted
Sydney	4	1975, 1991, 2003, 2022
Adelaide	3	1980, 1994, 2009
Melbourne	3	1984, 1997, 2015
Brisbane	3	1988, 2000, 2018
Hobart	1	2006
Perth	1	2012

The next festival will be held in Adelaide, in 2025.

== Long-running Participants ==
Group Name (Legal Name, Common Name, ABN/NZBN)	Established	City	Festivals	Website and Facebook Links
Łowicz - Łowicz Polish Vocal-Dance Ensemble	1975	Melbourne, VIC	1975 – 2018	https://lowiczmelbourne.org.au/
Oberek - Polish Association in Hobart Inc. - 53311885843	1952	Hobart, TAS	1975 – 2018	https://polishassociationhobart.org.au/oberek/
Polonez - Polonez Song and Dance Ensemble - 43166582258	1965	Melbourne, VIC	1975 – 2018	https://www.polonez.org.au/
Syrenka - Polish Folkloric Ensemble Syrenka Inc. - 64696734201	1971	Sydney, NSW	1975 – 2018	http://syrenka.org.au/
Tatry - Polish Folklore Ensemble TATRY - 67085314477	1958	Adelaide, SA	1975 – 2018	https://www.tatry.org.au/home/
Kujawy - Kujawy Sydney Polish Dance and Song Group - 32533002546	1976	Sydney, NSW	1980 – 2018	https://kujawysydney.com/
Lublin - Zespol Piesni i Tanca Lublin - Lublin Dance Company	1981	Wellington, NZ	1984,1988, 2003 – 2018	https://polishcommunity.org.nz/groups/lublin-dance-company/
Obertas - Polish Song and Dance Company of Brisbane	1982	Brisbane, QLD	1984 – 2022	https://www.obertas.org.au/
Wielkopolska - Council of Polish Organisations in the ACT Inc. - 69426628247	1981	Canberra, ACT	1988 – 1997	http://www.plcouncilact.org.au/wielkopolska.html
Lajkonik - Lajkonik Polish Song and Dance Ensemble - 56224795909	1990	Sydney, NSW	1991 – 2018	https://lajkonik.com.au/
Kukułeczka - Polish Dance Group Kukułeczka Inc. - 82310037099	1991	Perth, WA	1994 – 2018	https://www.kukuleczka.org.au/history/
Wawel - Polish Association in Wollongong Inc. - 70051695932	1963	Wollongong	1994 – 2003	http://www.polishassociationwollongong.org.au/wawel/
Orlęta - The Polish Association in New Zealand Inc. - 9429042784012	1994	Wellington, NZ	2003 – 2018	https://polishcommunity.org.nz/groups/orleta-dance-group/
Podhale - Polish Folklore Ensemble Podhale - 28210204384	2009	Sydney, NSW	2012 – 2018	http://www.podhale.org.au/index_files/Page266.htm,
Wisła - Wisła Polish Folkloric Ensemble Inc. - 71224463990	2010	Brisbane, QLD	2012 – 2018	http://wisla.org.au/
Polonus - Polonus Polish Folk Dance Group Inc. - 9429048699952	2014	Christchurch, NZ	2015 – 2018	https://www.polonia.org.nz/polonus-dance-group

== PolArt Inc. ==
Polish Visual and Performing Arts in Australia and New Zealand, commonly referred to as PolArt Inc., is an incorporated entity that was established in 2016 for the purpose of supporting the promotion of Polish Culture throughout Australia and New Zealand through PolArt. The establishment of PolArt Inc. as an independent body ensures that the intellectual property rights and legacy of the PolArt festival continues to belong to the Polish community for years to come. Alongside this, PolArt Inc. helps support the organisation and partial funding of PolArt festivals.
