= The Free Thought =

Ukrainian newspaper published in Australia

- The Ukrainian Newspaper in Australia
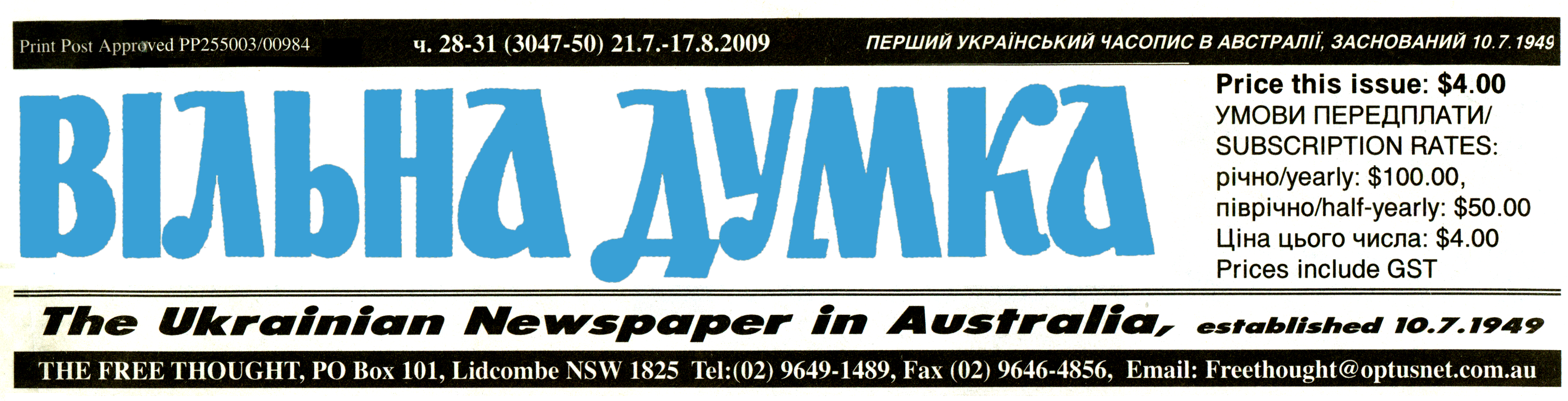
- Nameplate of The Free Thought
- Type: weekly newspaper
- Format: A2
- Founder(s): Wolodymyr Shumsky
- Editor-in-chief: Wolodymyr Shumsky
- Editor: Mark Shumsky
- Founded: 10 July 1949
- Language: Ukrainian and English
- Headquarters: Lidcombe, NSW, Australia
- Circulation: 1,500
- OCLC number: 17664565

The Free Thought, also known as Vil'na dumka, Vilna Dumka and in (Ukrainian: Вільна думка); is a weekly Ukrainian newspaper published in Australia since 1949. In addition to serving post-World War II immigrants and the second and third generations of those immigrants, the newspaper also caters to newer immigrants from post-Soviet Ukraine. It has sections in both Ukrainian and English.

== History ==
A large group of Ukrainian immigrants arrived in Australia in 1948, 1949, and 1950 with the assistance of two-year work contracts offered by the Australian government. This was the impetus for the creation of two Ukrainian-language newspapers in Australia, one of which was The Free Thought. Upon receiving the Federal Government's permission, the first edition was published on 10 July 1949. Since then, the newspaper has had a role in reporting on the establishment and development of Ukrainian Australian cultural and social life.

In the 1980s, The Free Thought helped establish the Ukrainian Studies Foundations in Australia Ltd. to support Ukrainian studies at the university level. In 1994, The Free Thought joined with the Ukrainian Studies Foundation to publish a history called the Almanac of Ukrainian Life in Australia, ISBN 9780908168040. Another book was published in 2001, this time with the Ukrainian Heritage Society in Australia, containing over 2000 biographies of Ukrainian Australians, titled Ukrainians in Australia: an Encyclopedic Guide ISBN 9780908168118.

== Organization ==
The founder, owner, and editor was Wolodymyr Shumsky (Szumskyj), who edited more than 3000 editions of the newspaper since its launch in 1949. An active member of the Ukrainian Australian community, Shumsky was awarded a Medal of the Order of Australia in 2009 for "service to the Ukrainian community through cultural, educational and literary contributions".

Over the years, contributors to Vilna Dumka have included Dmytro Nytczenko, Bohdan Podolianko, and Wasyl Onufrienko.

== Bibliography ==
- Shumsʹkyĭ, Volodymyr & Marko Shumsʹkyĭ (2001). Ukraïnt︠s︡i Avstraliï: ent︠s︡yklopedychnyĭ dovidnyk [Almanac of Ukrainian Life in Australia] (in Ukrainian). Sydney: "Vilʹna dumka"; T-vo zberez︠h︡enni︠a︡ ukraïnsʹkoï spadshchyny v Avstraliï. ISBN 978-0-908168-11-8. OCLC 71275847.
- Markusʹ, Vasylʹ, Darii︠a︡ Markusʹ, Shevchenko Scientific Society (US), and National Academy of Sciences of Ukraine (1995). Ent︠s︡yklopedii︠a︡ ukraïnsʹkoï dii︠a︡spory [Encyclopedia of Ukrainian Diaspora, Vol. 4 (Australia-Asia-Africa)] (in Ukrainian). Kyiv–New York–Chicago–Melbourne: Intel. ISBN 978-5-7702-1069-9. OCLC 35706424.
