= List of bandura ensembles =

This is a partial list of Ukrainian bandura ensembles, sorted by their home country, and linked to the groups' web sites.

See also Kobzarstvo.

== Argentina ==
- Taras Shevchenko Bandurist Capella

== Australia ==
- Hnat Khotkevych Bandurist Ensemble (Sydney)
- Lesia Ukrainka Bandurist Ensemble (Melbourne)
- Hryhory Kytasty Bandurist Ensemble (Adelaide)
- Vodohray Bandura Ensemble (Adelaide)
- S.o.V (Adelaide)
- Mykola Lysenko Bandurist Ensemble (Canberra)
- Lastivka (Sydney)
- Koloryt (Melbourne)

== Canada ==
- Canadian Bandurist Capella
- Hnat Khotkevych Bandurist Ensemble
- Barvinok
- Khvyli Dnipra Bandurist Ensemble
- Kobzari
- Hryhory Kytasty Bandurist Capella

== Czechoslovakia ==
- Prague Bandurist Capella

== Germany ==
- Leontovych Bandura Chorus
- Ostap Veresai Brotherhood

== Russia ==
- Moscow Bandurist Capella
- Leningrad Bandurist Capella
- Kuban Bandurist Capella
- Rostov Bandurist Capella

== Ukraine ==
- Poltava Bandurist Capella
- Charivnytsia, Dnipro
- Combined Bandurist Capella
- Kiev Bandurist Capella
- Lviv Bandurist Capella
- Poltava Women's Bandurist Capella
- Strytiv Bandurist Capella
- Lviv folk ensemble of bandura players
- Ukrainian Cappella Bandura Players
- Tcharivny Srtouny. Magical Strings & Voices of Ukraine
- B&B Project

== United Kingdom ==
- Selo
- Kobzarske bratstvo
- Dvi Doli

== United States ==
- Experimental Bandura Trio
- New York Bandura Ensemble
- Ukrainian Bandurist Chorus
- Women's Bandura Ensemble of North America
- Homin Stepiv
