= Hryhory Nazarenko =

Ukrainian-American bandurist (1902–1997)

- Григорій Назаренко
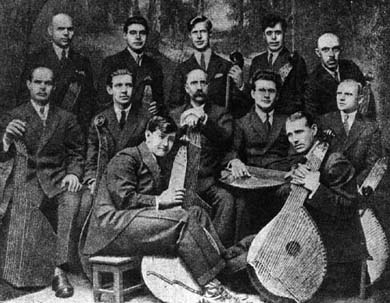
- Poltava Bandurist Chorus in 1931, with Hryhory Nazarenko in the back row, third from the left
- Born: October 13, 1902; Poltava, Russian Empire (now Ukraine)
- Died: 1997 (aged 94–95); Detroit, Michigan, United States
- Occupation: Bandura player

Hryhory Pavlovych Nazarenko (Note: Ukrainian: Григорій Павлович Назаренко, romanized: Hryhorii Pavlovych Nazarenko) (October 13, 1902 – 1997) was a bandura player.

Hryhory Nazarenko was one of the founding members of the Poltava Bandurist Capella which was established in Poltava in 1925. He had a brilliant first tenor voice and soon became one of the prominent soloist of the ensemble.

In 1935 he was enlisted into the newly formed combined Kiev Bandurist Capella where in time he became concertmaster. A number of his arrangements were recorded on record in the 1930s and he also was featured on a number of recordings as tenor soloist. In 1937 Nazarenko was slated to become artistic director of the chorus, but was sidestepped when the choice fell to Danylo Pika because of his membership in the Communist party.

Nazarenko was instrumental in setting up and establishing the Ukrainian Bandurist Chorus in Kiev in 1942, and was its first artistic director. Under his directorship the chorus gave a number of concerts: "The Live words of Taras Shevchenko" in Kiev, Volyn' and in outlying areas before the directorship was assumed by Hryhory Kytasty.

During the War in Germany together with the Honcharenko brothers he established the Leontovych Bandurist Capella in the British zone of occupation.

In the United States he continued for a brief time to be a member of the Ukrainian Bandurist Chorus.

Nazarenko died in Detroit in 1997.

His repertoire included numerous dumy (sung epic poems) which he learned from Hnat Khotkevych, such the duma about the Kozak-bandurist and Storm on the Black Sea.

== Students ==
- Volodymyr Luciv

== Sources ==
- Makhynia, H. - Hryhoriy Pavlovych Nazarenko - Bandura, #43-44, 1993
