= Kobzarska Sich =

Summer music camp

- Кобзарська Січ
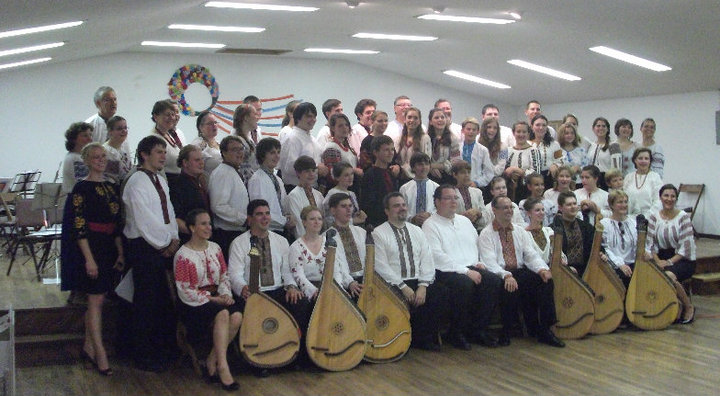
- Participants of the 2010 Ukrainian Choral Workshop and Bandura Course
- Formation: 1979
- Founder: Hryhory Kytasty
- Founded at: Emlenton, Pennsylvania, United States
- Type: Summer music camp
- Purpose: Instruction in bandura and Ukrainian choral music
- Headquarters: All Saints Camp, Emlenton, Pennsylvania
- Region served: North America
- Official language: Ukrainian and English
- Artistic Director: Teryn Kytasty-Kuzma (since 2025)
- Parent organization: Ukrainian Bandurist Chorus (historical sponsor)
- Website: www.banduracamp.org

Kobzarska Sich (Ukrainian: Кобзарська Січ) is a summer music camp devoted to learning bandura and Ukrainian choral music. Kobzarska Sich is held every August at All Saints Camp in Emlenton, Pennsylvania. In its current format, four courses are offered: Bandura Course, Junior Bandura Workshop (for children between the ages of 9 and 11), the Ukrainian Choral Workshop, and the Ukrainian Sacred Music Workshop.

Kobzarska Sich was established in 1979 by Ihor Mahlay and the legendary bandurist and composer Hryhory Kytasty, long-standing conductor of the Ukrainian Bandurist Chorus. For many years, Kobzarska Sich was sponsored by the Ukrainian Bandurist Chorus.

== Overview ==
Kobzarska Sich allows young musicians to study under some of the most accomplished bandurists as well as non-bandurist musicians from around the world, improving their bandura skills and musicianship. Previous camps have featured such prominent instructors as Hryhory Kytasty, Julian Kytasty, Viktor Kytasty, Victor Mishalow, Mykola Deychakiwsky, Marko Farion, Yarko Antonevych, Ostap Stakhiv, Oleh Mahlay, Taras Lazurkevych, Oleh Sozansky, Ola Herasymenko, Alexis Kochan, Bohdan and Halyna Heryavenko, Halyna–Kvitka Kondratsky and others.

Participants attending Kobzarska Sich’s Bandura Course are exposed to an intense personal experience. Participants receive over seven hours of daily individual and group instruction. Formal classroom instruction is offered in the techniques of bandura playing, bandura history, solo and ensemble playing, solo and ensemble singing, music lectures and theory.

All Saints Ukrainian Church Camp has always been home to Kobzarska Sich. Participants live in well kept cabins along the Allegheny River and, in addition to a rigorous music schedule, have an opportunity to enjoy recreational activities such as swimming, tennis, volleyball, baseball, basketball, and other fun activities.

== Programs ==
=== Bandura Programs ===
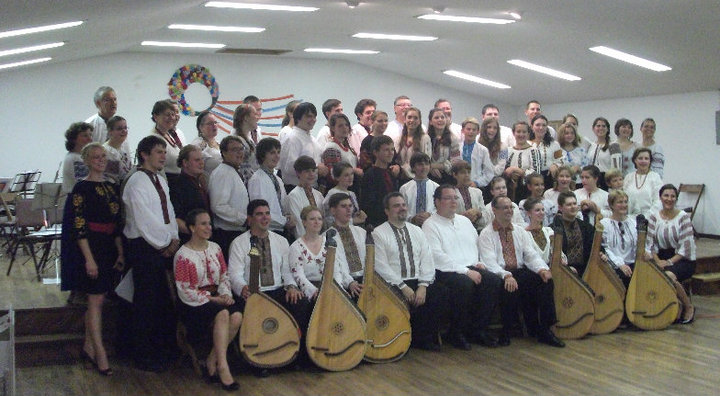
Participants of the 2010 Ukrainian Choral Workshop and Bandura Course

Campers are able to enroll into four different programs, based on experience, age and Interests. Aspiring bandura players between the ages of 9–12 have an opportunity to enroll in the one-week Junior Bandura Workshop.

Those who are 12 years and older have an opportunity to enroll in the full two-week Bandura Camp. This course focuses on over seven hours of daily group instruction in the technique of playing bandura, bandura history, solo and ensemble playing and singing, music lectures, and elementary music theory.

=== Choral Programs ===
Campers of all ages also have the option to be part of either the Ukrainian Choral Workshop or Sacred Music.

The Sacred Music workshop is a four-day seminar that provides an opportunity to sing sacred works by Ukrainian master composers and provides practical pointers for church singers, cantors, and conductors alike relative to common areas of church singing. Listening lectures open up many hidden aspects of sacred music tradition.

The Ukrainian Choral Workshop is a one-week intensive and enjoyable workshop focuses on the singing and performance of Ukrainian folk music. Participants take part in various ensembles, private lessons, and are instructed by teachers with extensive backgrounds in Ukrainian vocal music.
