= Volodymyr Luciv =

Ukrainian bandurist and singer (1929–2019)

Volodymyr Luciv Володимир Луців
- Born: June 5, 1929; Nadvirna, Second Polish Republic (present-day Ukraine)
- Died: September 7, 2019 (aged 90) London, England
- Genres: Folk
- Occupations: Bandurist; singer
- Instruments: Singing, bandura

Volodymyr Havrylovych Luciv (Note: Ukrainian: Володимир Гаврилович Луців, romanized: Volodymyr Havrylovych Lutsiv) (5 June, 1929 – 7 September, 2019) was a Ukrainian bandurist and tenor. He was born 5 June, 1929 in Nadvirna, eastern Poland, now present-day Ukraine. He learned to play the bandura from Hryhory Nazarenko in the Leontovych Bandurist Capella in Goslar, Germany. He completed his Conservatory music studies in 1957 in Rome majoring in voice, and resided in London.

In the Ukrainian diaspora community he performed throughout the world as a bandurist and singer and is known for his performance of dumy (sung epic poems). Professionally he performed as a singer on cruise ships in the Mediterranean under the stage name of Tino Valdi.

He was the author of numerous articles about the history of the bandura. He died in London on 7 September, 2019.

== See also ==
- Rostyslav Hluvko
