= Walter V. Bozyk =

Volodymyr Bozhyk (Ukrainian: Володимир Божик) or Walter V. Bozyk (December 27, 1908 in Rava-Ruska – January 9, 1991, in Los Angeles, US) was a Ukrainian bandurist, choral conductor and the arranger primarily for the Ukrainian Bandurist Chorus.

Born in Rava-Ruska what was then the Austro-Hungarian Empire, Bozhyk studied choral conducting and voice completing his studies at the Lviv Conservatory in 1931 and Lviv University in 1935. He sang in a vocal quartet for Polish radio initially in Lviv and then moved to Warsaw where conducted various choirs.

In 1940, Bozhyk became the music director of the Opera Theatre in Ivano-Frankivsk (previously Stanislaviv). In November 1945, he was invited to co-conduct the Ukrainian Bandurist Chorus in Germany.

In April 1949, he emigrated to the United States where he initially settled in Rochester and working in a bakery. He was later invited to Detroit in November 1949 to once again direct the Ukrainian Bandurist Chorus. In 1951 he recorded an album of records with the Chorus and continued to direct it until 1958.

In 1957, he toured Europe with the Ukrainian Bandurist Chorus as co-conductor with Hryhory Kytasty. The tour was not a financial success and the following year he moved back to Rochester to work in a tool and die shop. In 1960, he moved to Los Angeles where he became the choral director for the local Ukrainian Catholic Church and also directed a Ukrainian community choir known as "Kobzar".

Bozhyk's arrangements, particularly of Ukrainian Christmas Carols and Insurgent Army songs have been included in the repertoires of most Ukrainian diaspora choirs and Ukraine.

He died on January 9, 1991, in Los Angeles.
