= Ivan Boretz =

Ukrainian bandurist (died 1937)

Ivan Boretz Іван Борець
- Born: 1890; Boryspil, Russian Empire (present-day Ukraine)
- Died: 1937 (aged 46–47)
- Genres: Folk
- Occupation: Bandurist
- Instrument: Bandura

Ivan Oleksiiovych Boretz (Note: Ukrainian: Іван Олексійович Борець, romanized: Ivan Oleksiiovych Borets) (Ukrainian: Іван Олексійович Борець, 1890 – 1937) was a bandurist, a musician who played the bandura, a stringed instrument. Member of the Kyiv, Kharkiv and later Poltava Bandurist Capellas. Director of the Horiv Bandura Ensemble. Arrested by NKVD on 21 September 1937, shot on 11 November 1937. His family was informed that he had died on 12 February 1941. He was rehabilitated on 9 December 1957.
