= Oleh Mahlay =

American musician

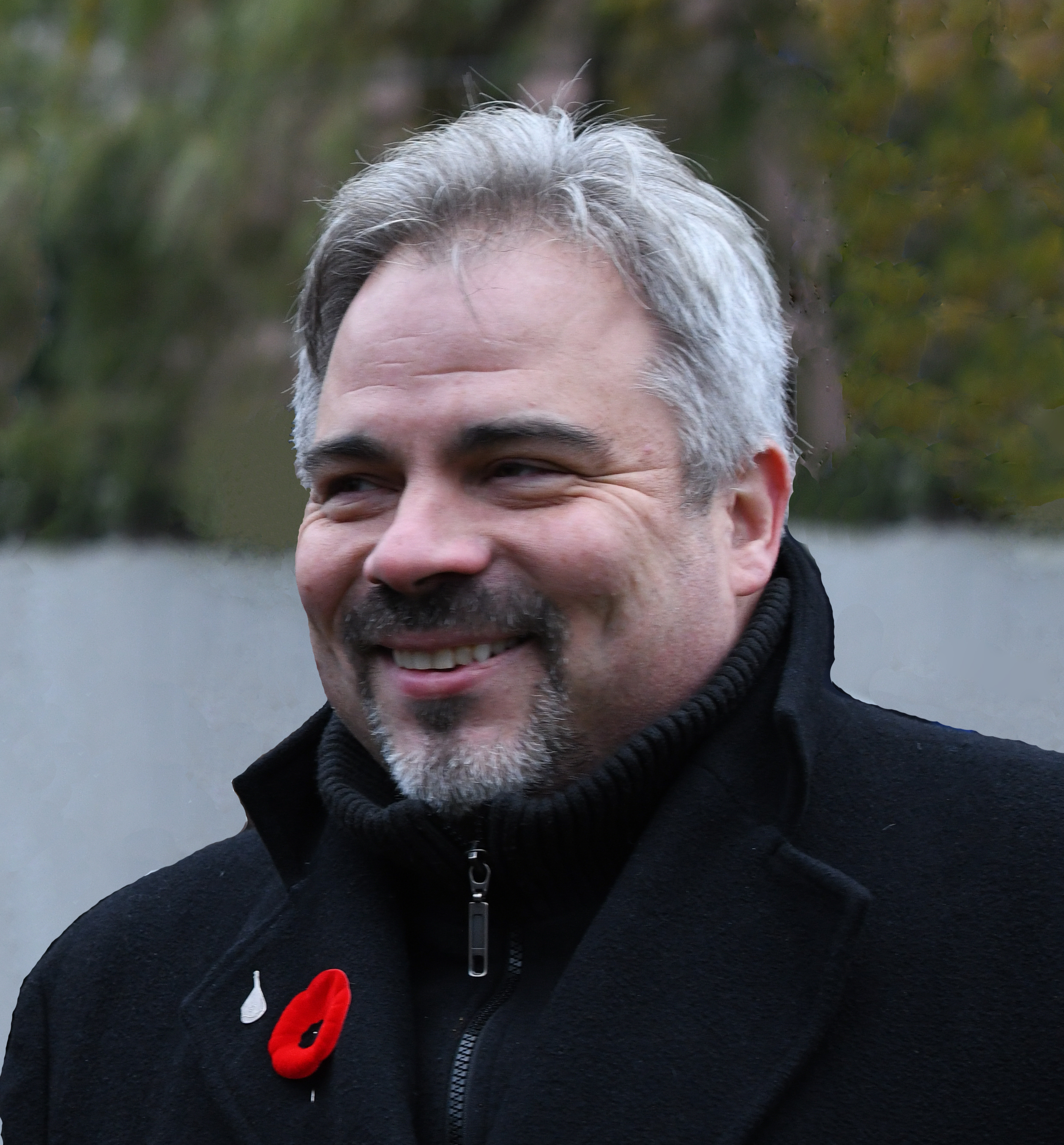
- Born: Oleh Mahlay; January 1, 1969 (age 56); Cleveland, Ohio, U.S.
- Education: Baldwin-Wallace College Conservatory of Music
- Occupations: Violinist; Bandurist; Conductor

Oleh Mahlay is an American violinist, pianist, bandurist, choral conductor and lawyer of Ukrainian ethnicity. Mahlay has made a significant contribution to Ukrainian emigre music, primarily through his work with the Ukrainian bandura and the Ukrainian Bandurist Chorus. Merited Figure of Arts of Ukraine.

== Biography ==
Born in Cleveland, Ohio, in 1969 to Ukrainian immigrants, Mahlay began to study the piano at the age of five. Soon after he began studies on the violin. He studied violin, music theory and form at the Cleveland Music School Settlement where he received scholarships for his studies. Mahlay also studied piano with Dr. George Cherry of Baldwin-Wallace College Conservatory of Music. His violin teachers included Elmer Setzer of the Cleveland Orchestra and Jeannette Drinkold-Meyer, a student of renowned violinist Josef Gingold.

Beginning in his early teens, Mahlay demonstrated outstanding ability in both the violin and the piano. At the 1986 Baldwin Wallace Conservatory Summer Music Clinic in Berea, Ohio, he won the piano competition, performing Mozart's Piano Concerto in G Major, K. 453 with orchestra. He repeated this feat the next year in which he performed Beethoven's Piano Concert No. 1 in C Major. He also played in various youth orchestra at the Baldwin Wallace Preparatory Department, and in 1987 was honored as the Outstanding Preparatory Student of the Year. That same year he was also the piano soloist in Beethoven's Choral Fantasy with the Parma Symphony Orchestra. He was also a member of the first violin section of the Cleveland Orchestra Youth Orchestra in its inaugural season.

Mahlay received a bachelor of arts in music history and literature from Case Western Reserve University. He studied voice and piano at the Cleveland Institute of Music. He served as the concertmaster of the University Circle Chamber Orchestra for four years. During his undergraduate studies, the university awarded him the Kennedy Prize for Creative Achievement in Music, and the Charles E. Clemens Prize for Talent and Accomplishment in Music. He is also a member of the Pi Kappa Lambda music honorary society at C.I.M. and C.W.R.U. Mahlay was a magna cum laude and phi beta kappa graduate.

In 1988, Maestro Mahlay attended the Bolzano Institute of Music in Bolzano, Italy. There, he concentrated on piano chamber works and accompanying. The previous two years he participated in a choral conducting seminar in Edmonton, Canada. This workshop was run by Wolodymyr Kolesnyk, formerly of the Kyiv Opera and artistic director of the Ukrainian Bandurist Chorus for over a decade.

== Career in Ukrainian music ==
At the age of 16, Mahlay became the choir director of St. Vladimir Ukrainian Orthodox Cathedral in Parma, Ohio. This position was held for many years by the late Hryhory Kytasty – Ukrainian composer, bandura player, artistic director of the Ukrainian Bandurist Chorus, and musical mentor to Oleh Mahlay. This post gave the current artistic director and conductor of the Chorus the opportunity at a very young age to explore and gain insights into the art of choral conducting and the mystical sounds of Slavic sacred music. Mahlay also has orchestral conducting experience, once serving as the assistant conductor for the Parma Symphony Orchestra.

Mahlay began his bandura studies at the age of 15. In 1988, he began his long association with the Kobzarska Sich Summer Bandura Camp in Emlenton, Pennsylvania, where he has served as conductor, lecturer, and music director over the years. He became a member of the Ukrainian Bandurist Chorus in 1987. Maestro Mahlay continues to teach bandura at the Hryhory Kytasty Cleveland School of Bandura in Parma, Ohio.

== Career in Ukrainian Bandurist Chorus ==
Oleh Mahlay became the artistic director and conductor of the world-renowned Ukrainian Bandurist Chorus in April 1996 at the age of 26. He is the youngest artistic director in the Chorus' then 85-year history. Mahlay's lifelong association with the ensemble, a deep appreciation of the bandura and Ukrainian music, along with his diverse musical background and skills have brought a new and exciting vision to this award-winning group.

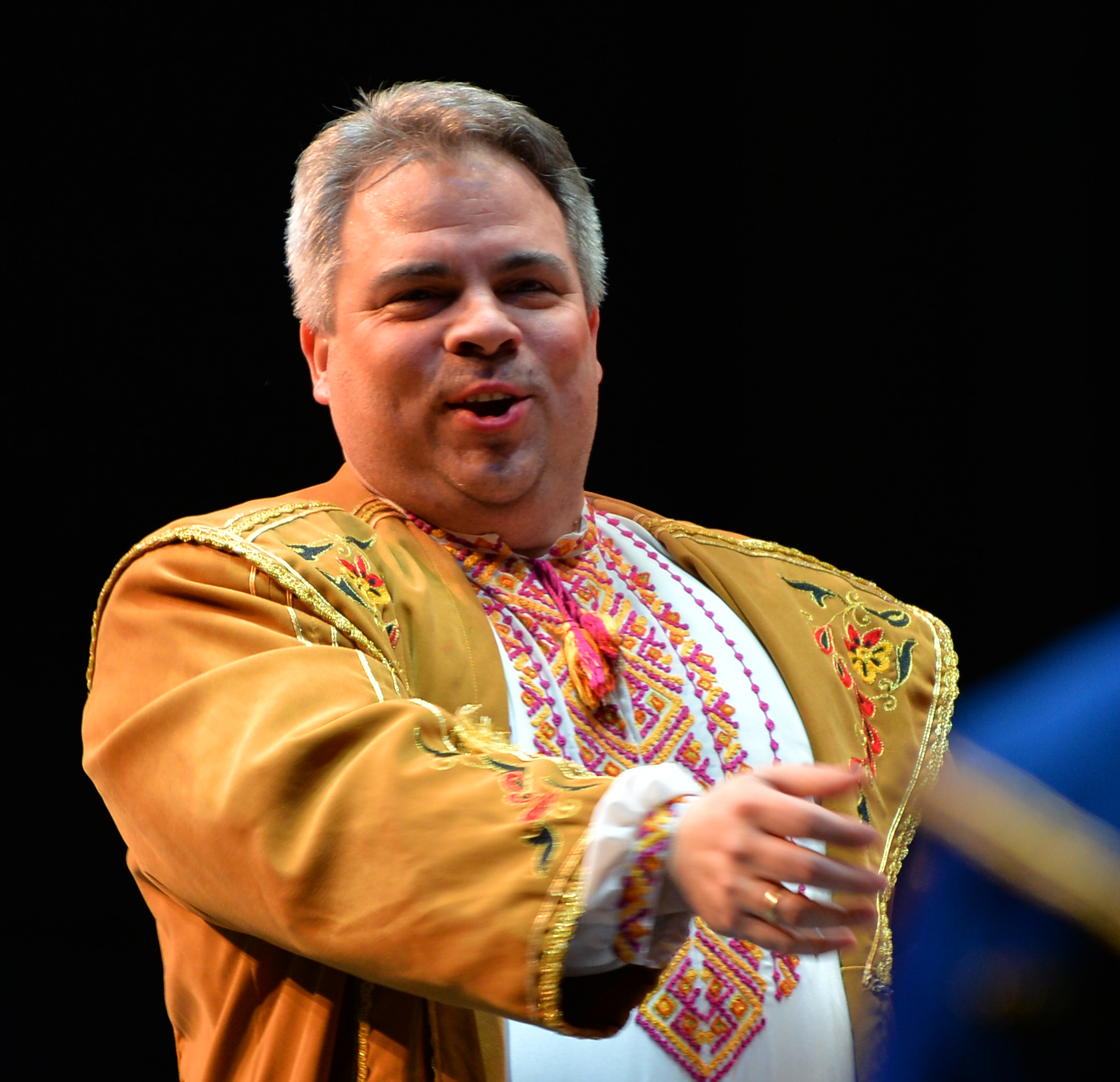

Mahlay became a member of the artistic committee of the ensemble in 1992, and in 1994 was given the responsibilities of assistant conductor. He participated in the Chorus' two triumphant tours of Ukraine in 1991 and 1994, and had his premier as a conductor of the group in 1994. In the last few years he has also given lecture demonstrations at public schools as well as universities.

Currently, Oleh Mahlay is a practicing attorney in the Cleveland as a Staff Hearing Officer, for the Industrial Commission of Ohio. He continues to teach voice and bandura, and frequently lectures and conducts workshops both in the Northeast Ohio area and throughout the United States and Canada. He also acts as the vocal coach for the female Ukrainian folk trio Native Spirit (Ridna Dusha). The Ukrainian Bandurist Chorus has released six audio recordings with Mahlay at the helm. The Ukrainian Steppe, A Bandura Christmas, Golden Echoes of Kyiv: The Divine Liturgy, The European Tour (2003), Bayda (2005) and 1659 (2007) also feature some of the artistic director's compositions and arrangements.

== Sources ==
- UBC website
