= Opanas Slastion =

Ukrainian artist and ethnographer (1855–1933)

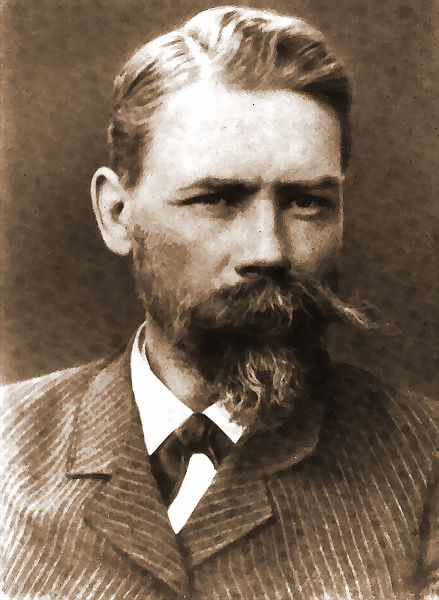
- Born: Опанас Георгійович Сластьон; 2 December [O.S. 20 November] 1855; Berdiansk, Taurida Governorate, Russian Empire (present-day Berdiansk, Ukraine)
- Died: September 24, 1933 (aged 77); Myrhorod, Poltava Oblast, Ukrainian SSR, Soviet Union (now in Ukraine)

Opanas Heorhiiovych Slastion (Ukrainian: Опанас Георгійович Сластіон, 2 December [O.S. 20 November] 1855 – September 24, 1933) was a Ukrainian graphic artist, painter, architect and ethnographer.

He was born in the port town of Berdiansk (now Ukraine) on the Berdyansk Gulf of the Sea of Azov. He studied at the Imperial Academy of Arts in Saint Petersburg, Russia (where he was also known as Afanasy Slastyon), researched the Cossack documents in the archives of the Russian ministry of defense, and later worked as a teacher at the Arts and Crafts School (later renamed the State Ceramics Vocational School) in Myrhorod. He cultivated his talents in singing, bandura playing, ethnography, journalism, education, design, and architecture. Opanas Slastion was a Ukrainian encyclopaedist.

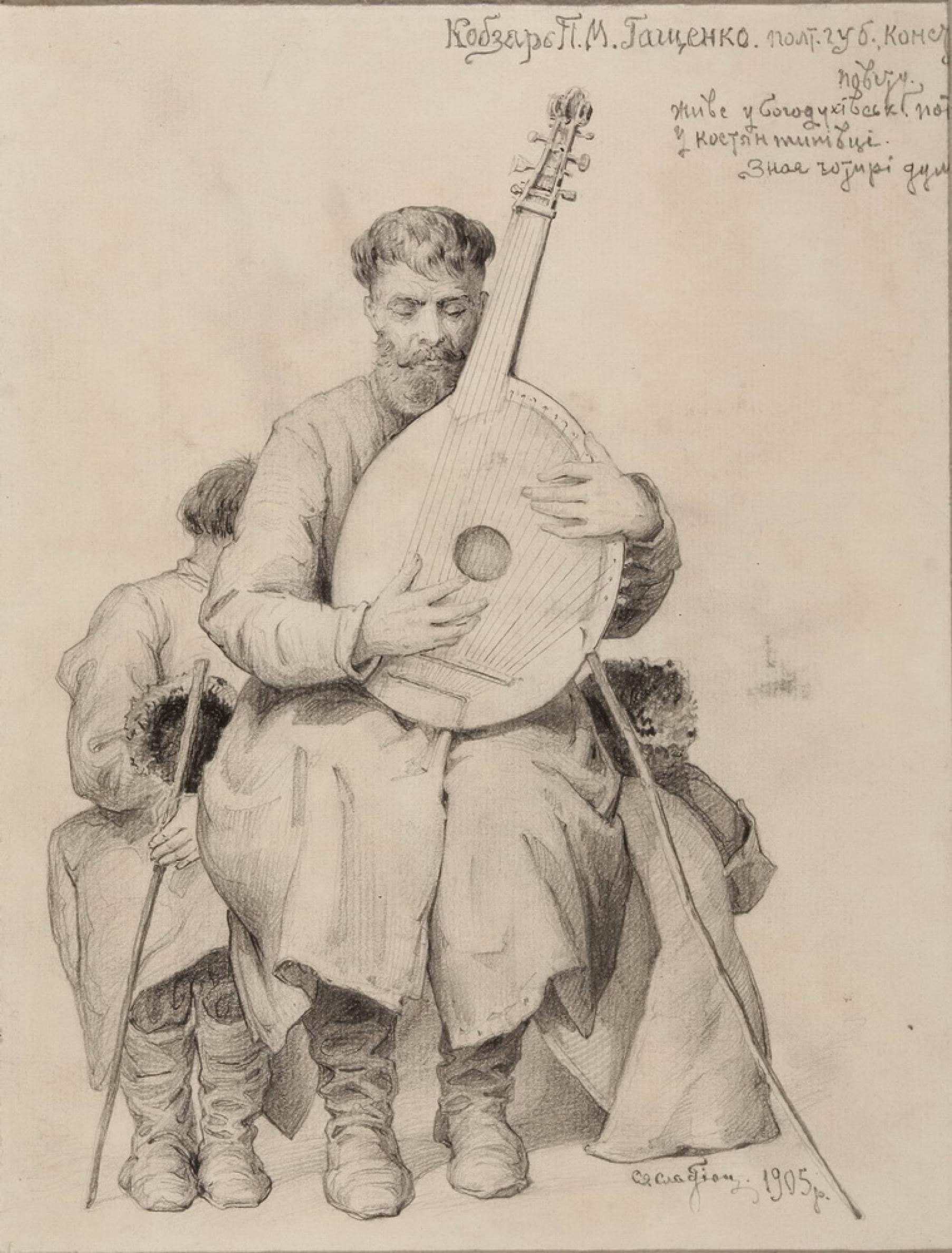
Portrait of kobzar Pavlo Hashchenko by Opanas Slastion.

== Ukraine at the turn of the 19th–20th centuries ==
At the time Slastion was growing up, there were opportunities for some Ukrainians to have their talents recognized in the Imperial capital and in Western Europe. Many gifted Ukrainian performers joined court choirs and theatre, opera, and ballet troupes, and the Ukrainian artists were attracted to the Academy of Arts in St. Petersburg. In the 19th century among these Ukrainian artists was the famous poet and writer Taras Shevchenko, whose writings, etchings and paintings dedicated to Ukrainian ethnographic themes (genre scenes and portraits) greatly influenced Slastion, who became the first illustrator of Shevchenko's 'Kobzar' (the illustrations to "Haidamaky"). As a painter, Slastion is credited with depicting series of Cossack and kobzar portraits and scenes of Ukrainian country life.

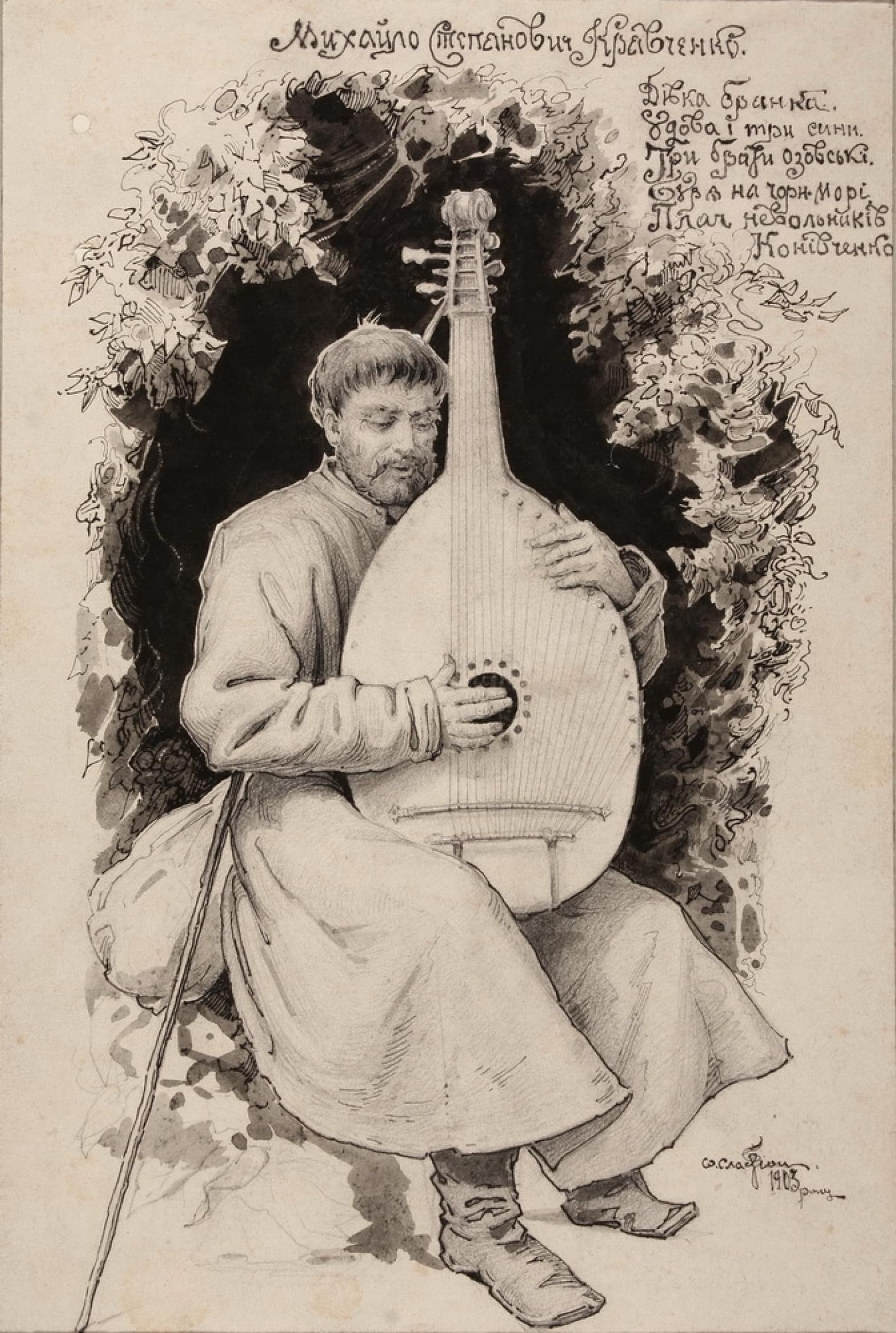
Portrait of kobzar Mykhailo Kravchenko by Opanas Slastion.

== Slastion and the kobzars ==
Slastion was one of the most active propagators of the artistry of the kobzars. Actually, he himself was the first outstanding sighted bandura player and tutor of modern times. Kobzar Ivan Kuchuhura-Kucherenko stayed with him in Myrhorod in order to refine his performance of dumy (sung epic poems) under the guidance of Slastion. Danylo Pika, one of the founders of the Poltava Bandurist Capella (who became its conductor), initially learned to play the bandura from Slastion in Myrhorod. Later in his life, in the early 1930s, Slastion designed the shape of the standard Kyiv bandura (the familiar modern shape of the instrument). Some other instruments of the bandura family (such as those made by Ivan Skliar, for example) were also modeled on Slastion's designs.

== Slastion the ethnographer ==
Slastion was also a leading Ukrainian folklorist and ethnographer. In 1875, then a student at the Petersburg Academy of Arts and a budding folklorist, he spent his holidays in Ukraine and got the chance to know the artistry of the kobzar Nekhovaizub.

In 1876 P. Martynovych and his colleague Slastion travelled to Lokhvytsia and recorded the duma parody by kobzar Ivan Kravchenko. In 1887 Slastion made an engraving of kobzar P. Siroshtan. In 1905 he painted a portrait of kobzar Pavlo Hashchenko and noted that Hashchenko knew four dumy.

In 1902-1903 he was one of the initiators of the idea of the preservation of kobzar music by means of sound recording using recently invented phonograph.

In 1906 Slastion met the kobzar Zhovniansky, recorded his performances of dumy, and painted his portrait.

In 1908 in Yalta the technically savvy Slastion helped Lesia Ukrainka and her husband Klyment Kvitka make live recordings (on phonograph cylinders) of the dumy performed by the blind virtuoso Hnat Honcharenko (circa 1837 - circa 1917), as part of the major project of the preservation of kobzar music. These recordings were transcribed by Filaret Kolessa, who later published them in his collection Melodiyi ukrayins'kykh narodnykh dum (The Melodies of the Ukrainian Folk Dumas). It is known that Slastion corresponded with another well-known blind kobzar, Tereshko Parkhomenko (1872–1910). In 1909 Slastion made recordings of the repertoire of kobzar Hovtan, including the duma "The Widow and Her Three Sons".

Selections from Slastion's repertoire originally recorded on wax cylinders can be found on a record released as a dedication to Lesya Ukrainka.

== Architectural work ==
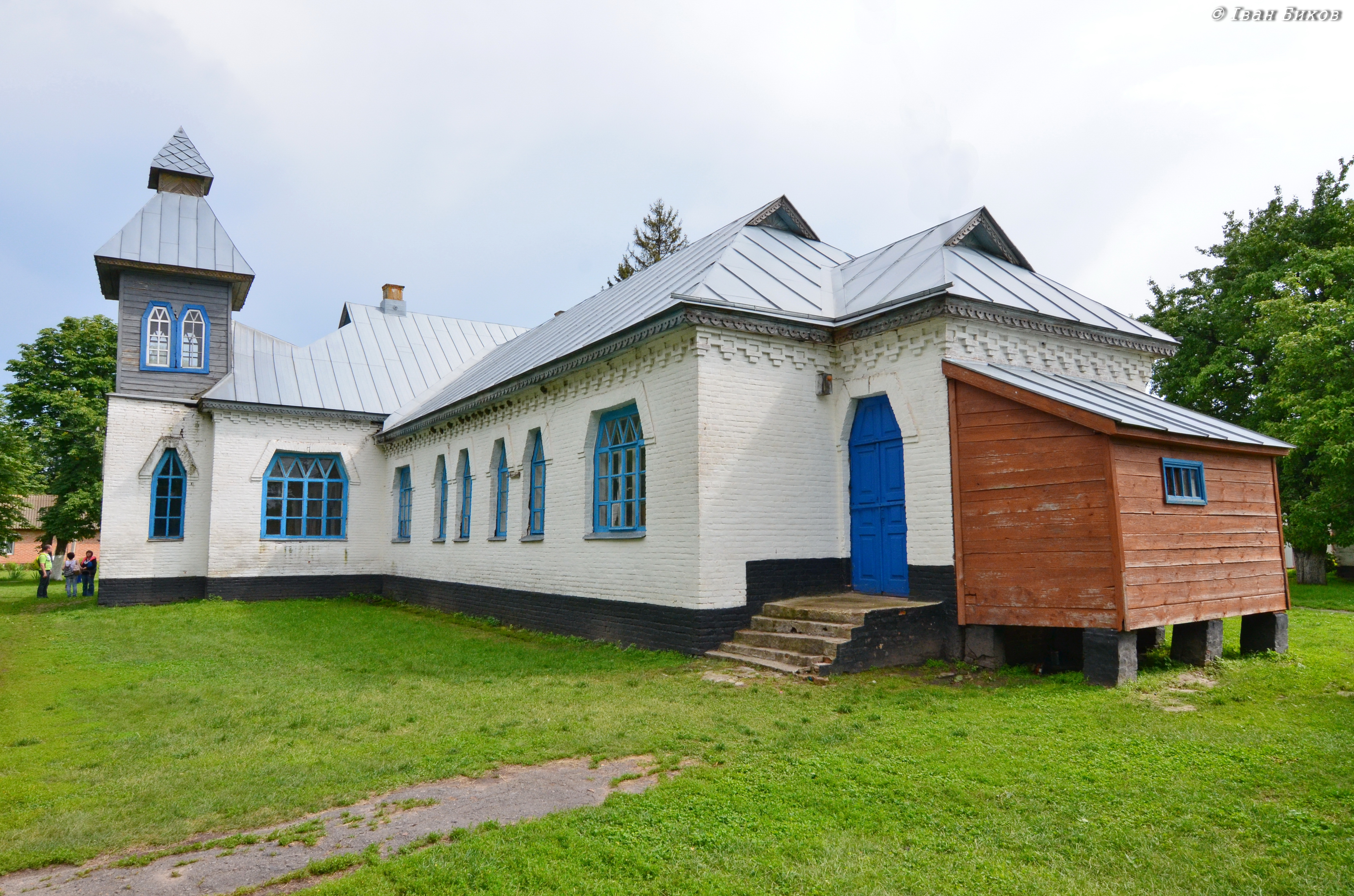
A 1912 zemstvo school in Hiltsi (now in Lubny Raion) designed by Slastion

As an architect, Opanas Slastion was one of the founding fathers of the Ukrainian Art Nouveau style in architecture. Following the indtroduction of compulsory primary education in the Russian Empire in 1908, Slastion was involved in the development of school buildings in Lokhvytsia povit at the invitation of the local zemstvo. In 1910-1911 construction works on over 20 schools started in the town of Varva and surrounding settlements. In total, between 1912 and 1917 over 90 schools were built around Poltava Governorate according to Slastion's projects.

As a specialist in folk architecture, Slastion insisted on designing the buildings according to Ukrainian national traditions. The schools were built from materials abundant on the location, such as wood, brick, gravel, cement, clay and brashwood; fireproof bricks for the stoves was transported from Kyiv and Opishnia. Instead of walls, classroms were separated with wooden panels. Every school building was decorated with one or two towers, which had a practical meaning, marking the entrance, and were decorated with the arms of the local government.

Slastion's architectural style became popular, and in the years before World War I similarly designed buildings were erected around Kaniv, in Kherson Governorate and in Kuban. During the Soviet era many of the schools designed by Slastion were damaged due to their association with "bourgeois nationalism", and many others were destroyed during World War II. Only during the 1970s did the buildings start to get positive reactions in the press, although the name of their architect was frequently omitted. In our days, 57 school buildings built according to Slastion's projects survive, with 46 of them being located in Lubny, Lokhvytsia, Pyriatyn and Chornukhy hromadas. Many of the schools have been rebuilt and several have been repurposed. Since 2019 an excursion program dedicated to schools of Lokhvytsia zemstvo has been organized.
