= Ukrainian Bandurist Chorus =

Semi-professional male-voice choir

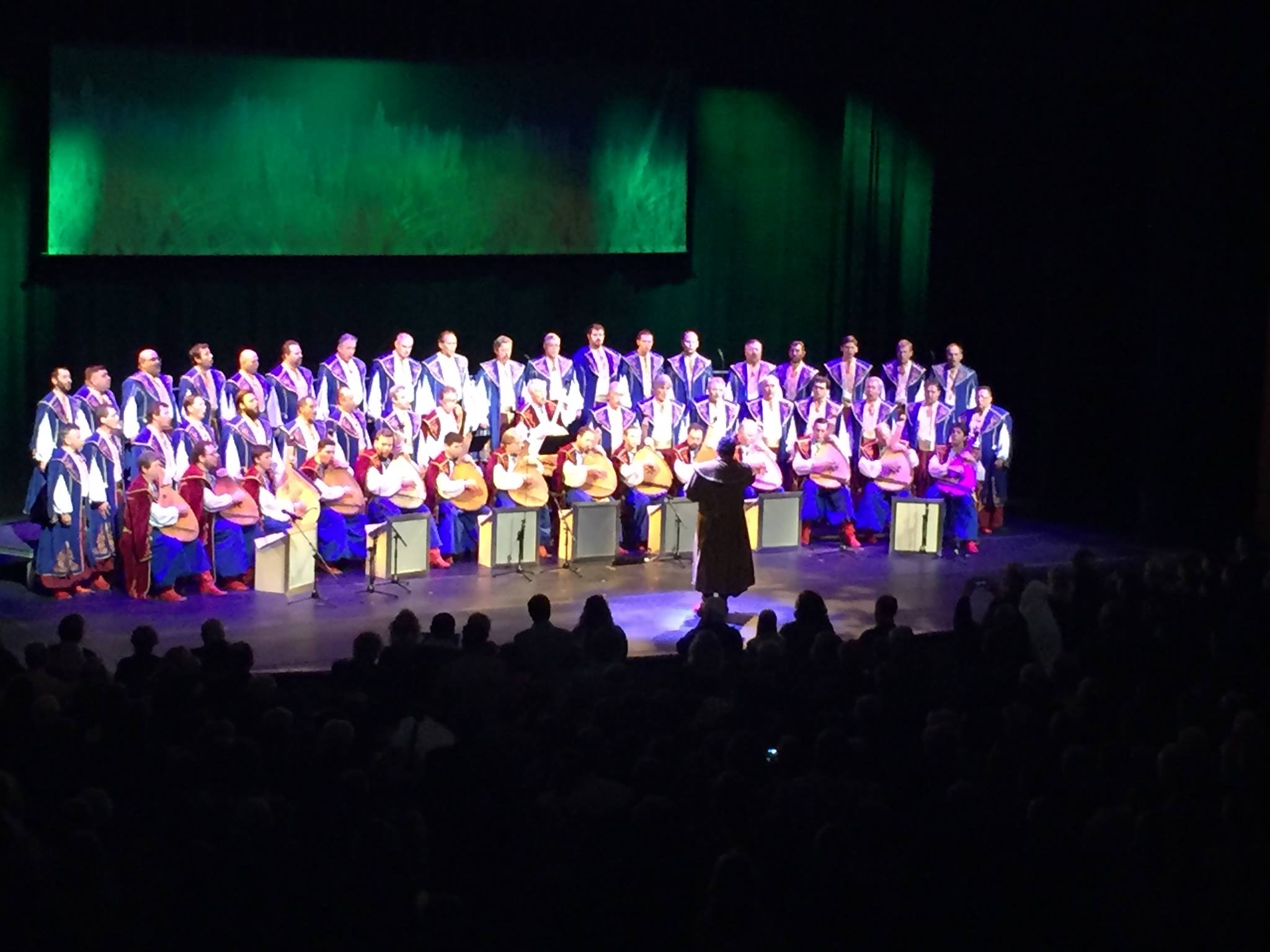
The Ukrainian Bandurist Chorus of Taras Shevchenko performs in Washington, D.C. in November 2015

The Ukrainian Bandurist Chorus (Ukrainian: Українська Капеля Бандуристів Північної Америки ім. Т. Г. Шевченка; full name: The Taras Shevchenko Ukrainian Bandurist Chorus of North America) is a semi-professional male choir which accompanies itself with the multi-stringed Ukrainian instrument known as the bandura. The UBC traces its roots to Ukraine in 1918 and has been based in the USA since 1949.

== History ==
Some sources trace the history of the Ukrainian Bandurist Chorus back to the formation of the Kyiv Kobzar Choir by bandurist Vasyl Yemetz in Kyiv in 1918; however, the history of the Kyiv Bandurist Capella had numerous starts and stops, and periods in which it was not a functioning entity. Despite the fact that many of the members of the Ukrainian Bandurist Chorus were participants of previously existing bandurist capellas, the history of the Ukrainian Bandurist Chorus can be traced without interruption from its formation in Kyiv in 1941.

=== Pre-history ===
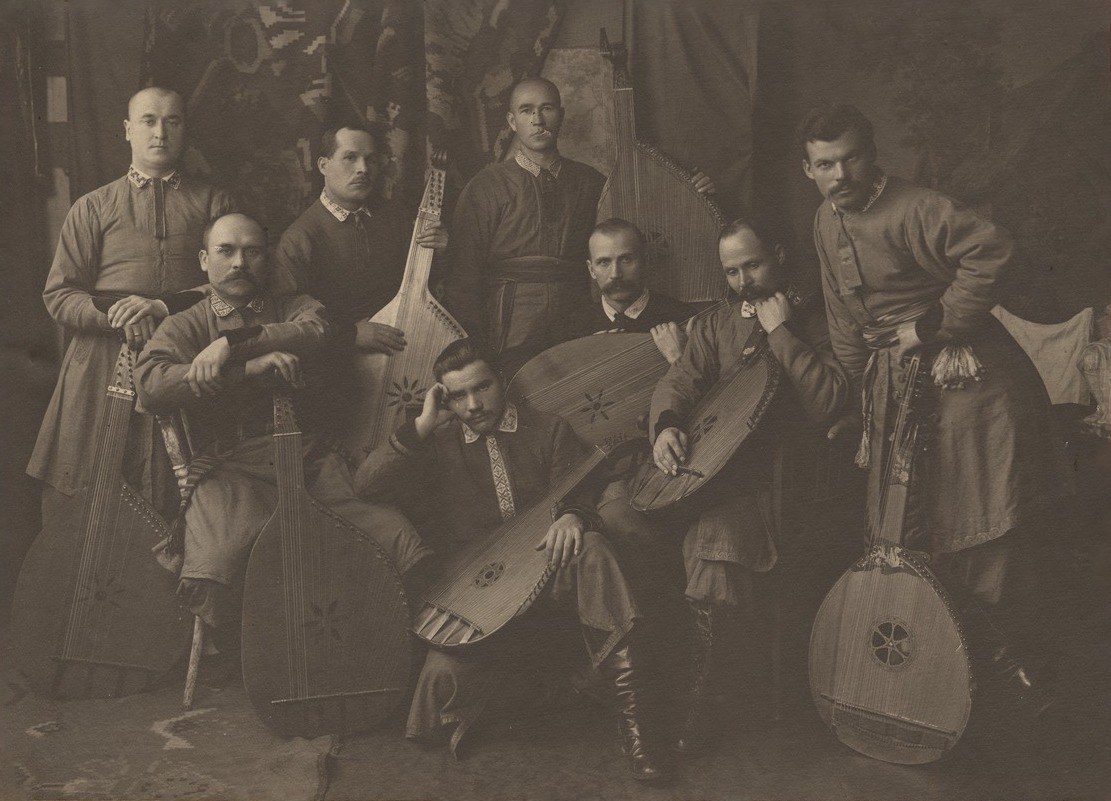
Kyiv Bandurist Capella in 1924

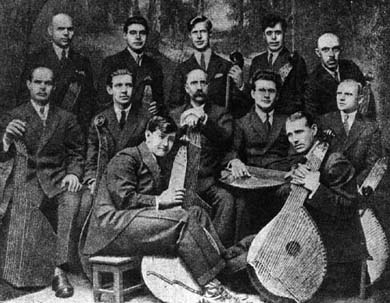
Poltava Bandurist Capella in 1931

The Kyiv Bandurist Capella was originally established in August 1918 by bandura virtuoso Vasyl Yemetz with 8 bandurists. Initially, it was known as the "Kobzar Choir" and gave its first performance on November 3, 1918. The situation in Kyiv was politically unstable and this first ensemble ceased performing in March 1919. With the change over to a Bolshevik government, a number of the members were executed. Some emigrated to the West.

With the re-establishment of the group, the term "Capella" began to be used, harking back to the vocal-instrumental ensembles, known as "kapellen" often directed by invited German kapellmeisters that were popular in the estates of the Ukrainian gentry in the early 18th century.

The Capella was re-established after a four-year break in December 1923, once again with eight members; however, only two (Fedir Doroshko and Hryhory Kopan) were from the original "Kobzar Choir" initially under the leadership of Vasyl Potapenko and then M. Polotay. During the brief period of Ukrainianization, the ensemble grew in popularity; however, in the 1930s the political situation in Ukraine changed significantly and bandurists underwent various forms of political repression: some being arrested and sentenced to periods of incarceration, others to exile. In October 1934 the Kyiv Bandurist Capella was liquidated after its members had not received any pay for a period of 10 months.

By March 1935 the political situation had once again changed. Many of the most drastic steps taken to retard the development of Ukrainian culture were reconsidered, as little was now left to show off any development in Ukrainian culture during the period of Soviet rule. In March 1935 the remaining members of the Kyiv Bandurist Capella and the Poltava Bandurist Capella were brought together to form a new Combined Bandurist Capella.

In 1937 another turn in national politics took place. Harassment and arrests commenced again. Almost all of the bandurists were arrested at one time or another and a significant number were convicted of political crimes and many were executed. At the outset of WWII, most Soviet musical collectives continued to function giving concerts for the Soviet armed forces. The Combined Bandurist Capella was again disbanded and the members mobilized to the German-Soviet front. A significant number of its members needlessly died in the first few days of the war on the front because of lack of military preparation and equipment.

=== World War II and formation ===
During the Nazi occupation of Ukraine, attempts were made to re-establish a professional bandurist capella in Kyiv by bandurist D. Chernenko. The bandurists of the Kyiv Capella had all been immediately mobilized into the Red Army with the Nazi invasion; however, a number of bandurists who had survived had returned to Kyiv and a group initially directed by the former concertmaster Hryhory Nazarenko was established and began rehearsing. In the spring of 1941, it applied to the Kiev City Council for permission to use Taras Shevchenko as its patron, which was granted. In time, with his arrival, the artistic directorship was transferred to Hryhory Kytasty. Initially, the capella serviced areas around Kyiv and parts of Western Ukraine.

In 1942 the capella made up of seventeen singer-bandurists left Kyiv for a tour of Germany. On arrival, it was interned as a group into a forced labour camp in Hamburg. After numerous representations, the group was released after five months' incarceration in order to be used by the Nazis as a morale booster, performing for the Ukrainian OST-Arbeiters (slave-workers from the East) in German work camps.

At the end of the war, the capella found itself in Regensberg.

In order to strengthen the artistry of the capella, Volodymyr Bozhyk, an opera conductor trained in Poland, was invited to become co-conductor. Bozhyk conscripted a number of trained singers and the capella was transformed from a bandurist cappella (where all its members played the bandura) into a bandurist chorus (where only some performers played the bandura and others just sang).

The chorus continued for a period of time to perform throughout Germany after the war for the many internees living in the displaced peoples (D.P.) camps.

=== United States ===
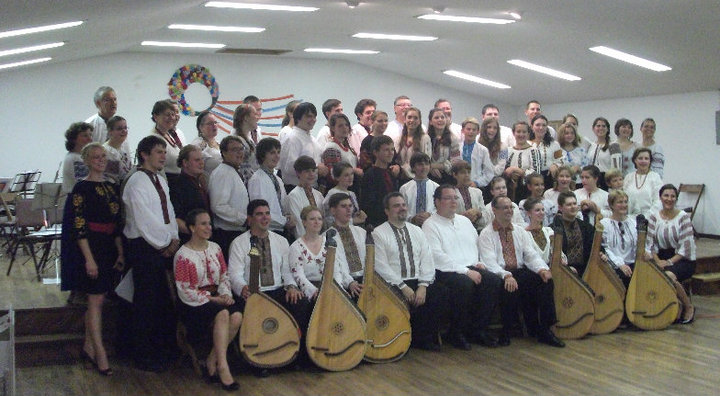
Participants in the Annual Bandura Camp in 2010 held under the auspices of the UBC

In 1949 the chorus emigrated to the United States, settling as a group in Detroit. Initially, it toured North America attempting to retain a professional performing status; however, this became economically unviable without radically changing the repertoire and artistic direction of the group. The decision was made to not compromise the group's artistic integrity. As a result, the chorus changed from a professional to semi-professional status, touring North America for only a few weeks each year.

In 1958 the chorus toured Europe giving concerts in Spain, France, Switzerland, Germany, the Netherlands, Sweden, Denmark, Belgium and England. Despite the highly successful reviews of the chorus's performances, the tour was not an economic success. As a result, it was not able to return to a fully professional status. The chorus was left in substantial debt and the conductors Volodymyr Bozhyk and Hryhory Kytasty both left the group after the tour.

On return, the artistic directorship was assumed by the assistant conductor Petro Potapenko. The debt was paid off almost single-handedly by the chorus's manager Peter Honcharenko who also kept the chorus intact as a viable performing ensemble.

The early 1960s saw a crisis in the artistic leadership of the group. It was difficult to find a conductor who not only could direct a chorus, but was knowledgeable in Ukrainian music traditions and the bandura, and who could compose, arrange and orchestrate for such a unique group. These problems were overcome by the administrative genius of Peter Honcharenko who devised an artistic council that would delegate many of the finer tasks among the membership of the group to be led by a professional conductor. As a result, the group was able to survive this difficult period finding a new purpose for the promotion of Ukrainian music, primarily to the many Ukrainian community enclaves in North America. The establishment of a charitable foundation to help fund the activities of the chorus and the management of their own recordings also helped to once again put the group on a solid financial foundation.

In 1968 Hryhory Kytasty returned to the artistic directorship of the chorus. With new-found energy, he enriched the repertoire of the ensemble with new compositions and arrangements and trained a new generation of bandurists, many who had been born in North America. A new and successful self-funding formula was developed by the chorus's manager. The capella would regularly, usually bi-yearly, release a new record and go on tour promoting the recording, alternating from east or west coasts of North America. Summer music camps which focused on intensive training in bandura playing and other aspects of Ukrainian music became the chorus's conservatory providing sources for instrumentalists for the ensemble. Many noted bandurist members taught at these camps, workshops and seminars including Peter Kytasty, Viktor Kytasty, Julian Kytasty, Marko Farion, Andrew Kytasty, Mykola Deychakiwsky, Michael Serdiuk and Taras Pavlovsky.

In 1980, the chorus under the direction of H. Kytasty toured Australia.

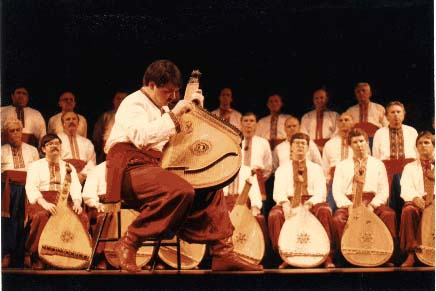
Instrumental soloist performing with the Ukrainian Bandurist Chorus

After the passing of Hryhory Kytasty in 1984, Wolodymyr Kolesnyk was invited to direct the ensemble. Kolesnyk was originally a graduate of the Kyiv Conservatory in both folk instrument performance and conducting and before his defection had risen to the position of artistic director of the Kyiv Opera. Kolesnyk elevated the chorus to a new professional level in both vocal and instrumental performance. Under his directorship, the chorus toured Ukraine twice in 1991 and 1994 and received the prestigious Shevchenko award from the Ukrainian government.

In 1996 Oleh Mahlay took over the artistic directorship of the chorus, becoming the youngest artistic director in the chorus's history. Under his leadership, the chorus toured Ukraine twice, as well as North America and Europe and re-energized the membership. His numerous recordings with the chorus include a Christmas repertoire, a Divine Liturgy, and Hryhory Kytasty's "Battle of Konotop" which have done much to strengthen the ensemble both financially and artistically. Mahlay also has continued to be involved with the Kobzarska Sich Bandura Camps in Emlenton, Pennsylvania which continues to be sponsored by the UBC.

Adrian Bryttan became the chorus's artistic director in 2008–2010.

In 2011 Bohdan Heryavenko, the former chorus master of the Lviv opera was elected to the position of artistic director until his return to Ukraine in 2012.

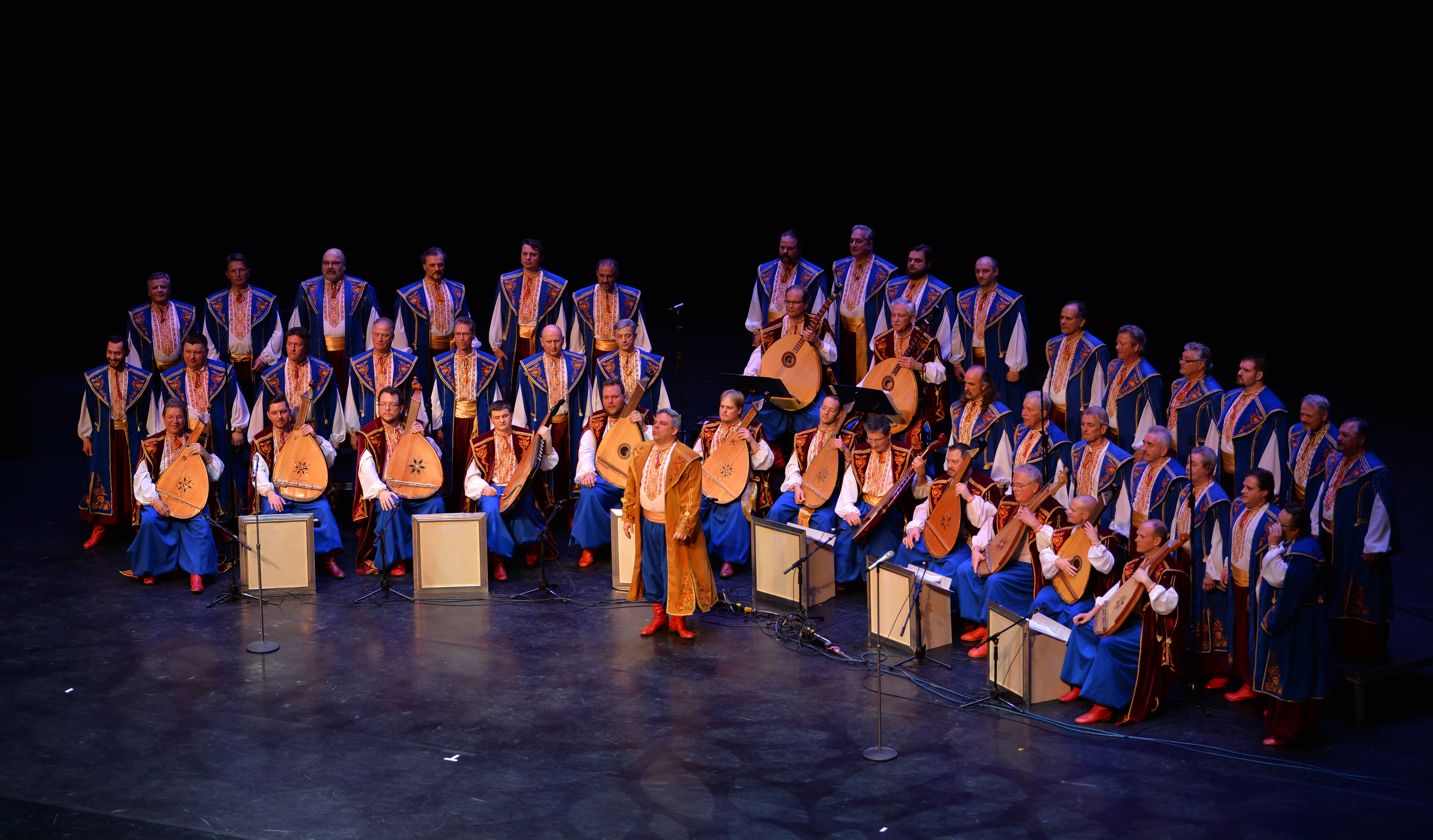

== Artistic directors and Conductors ==
- Hryhoriy Nazarenko (1942) Formally the youngest member the Poltava Bandurist Capella (from 1925), and later concertmaster of the Combined Bandurist Capella formed in Kyiv in 1935—he initiated the formation of the Ukrainian Bandurist Chorus and in particular the use of Taras Shevchenko as its patron. He was its first director for the first 3 concerts in Kyiv and Zhytomyr. When Hryhory Kytasty, who was the assistant conductor of the Combined Kyiv Bandurist Capella joined, the directorship was transferred to him. Nazarenko became assistant conductor until he left the chorus with the Honcharenko brothers to form the Leontovych Bandura Chorus in 1946.
- Hryhory Kytasty (1942–45, 1945–47 co-conductor, 1946–48, 1949–50, 1953–55 co-conductor, 1958 co-conductor, 1968–84) Member of Kiev Bandurist Capella from 1935. An assistant conductor of the Combined Kyiv Bandura Capella from 1937.
- Volodymyr Bozhyk (1945–47, 1950–52, 1953–55 co-conductor, 1956–57, 1958 co-conductor) From 1945–47 co-director and co-conductor with Hryhory Kytasty. He was invited to become co-conductor of the capella if he could add his singers to the chorus. Conductor from 1950–52. Co-conductor 1953–58.
- Petro Potapenko (1959–61), conductor. Assistants: Ye Ciura and I. Kytastyj
- Ivan Zadorozhny (1962), conductor
- Ivan Kytasty (1963), co-conductor. Conducted the capella in 1963
- Yevhen Ciura (1963)
- Petro Potapenko (1959–60, '61, '65), conductor. Assistants: Ye. Ciura and I. Kytasty
- Ivan Zadorozhny (1962, 1965–66), conducted. Assistant: Ye Ciura
- Ivan Kytasty and Yevhen Ciura (1967). Co-conductors
- Hryhory Kytasty (1968–83)
- Yevhen Ciura (1984). Concert in Windsor
- Wolodymyr Kolesnyk (1984–1996)
- Oleh Mahlay (1996–2008)
- Adrian Bryttan (2008–2009)
- Bohdan Heryavenko (2010–2012)
- Oleh Mahlay (2012–present)
