= Danylo Pika =

Ukrainian bandurist (1901–1941)

Danylo Fedorovych Pika Данило Федорович Піка
- Born: 1901
- Died: 1941 (aged 39–40)
- Genres: Folk
- Occupation: Bandurist
- Instrument: Bandura

Danylo Fedorovych Pika (Note: Ukrainian: Данило Федорович Піка, romanized: Danylo Fedorovych Pika) (Ukrainian: Данило Федорович Піка, 1901 – 1941) was one of the founders of the Poltava Bandurist Capella. Initially he learned to play the bandura from Opanas Slastion in Myrhorod. Pika was one of the more talented players of the capella and also wrote out a number of interesting arrangements.

Pika became the assistant director to Mykola Mykhailov in the Kyiv Bandurist Capella. In 1941 he was mobilized to the front where he died in the first weeks of battle.

Pika was one of the stronger players in the Capella. He performed in a bandura quartet with Serhiy Minialo, Yakiv Kladovyj and O. Kostetsky and recorded a Hopak (his arrangement), "Stukalka" (his arrangement) and "Kucheriava Kateryna" in 1937. The Capella also recorded his arrangement of "Vziav by ya banduru" with Ivan Patorzhynsky in 1937 and Hrechanyky. "Oj hop ty-ny-ny" often accredited to Pika is marked as being arranged by Lysenko-Kropovnytsky and conducted by Pika in 1939.

Pika became artistic director of the Poltava Bandurist Capella after the arrest of Volodymyr Kabachok in early 1934 until the group was disbanded in mid 1934. During the period of his directorship the members of the Poltava Bandurist Capella were not paid. He was the strongest bandurists in the group and probably the first to have played bandura in the group having initially converted the singers to bandurists and then initially teaching them. He always had directorship aspirations but not the administrative skills. He is thought by some to have been a KGB informer and had informed on V. Kabachok and caused his subsequent arrest. He became a director of the Kiev Bandurist Capella for a short period of time.

He died during the first two weeks of World War II on the front lines. Pika signed his name to numerous arrangements by Khotkevych (Od Kyiva do Luben, Oj Dzhygune,) - Khotkevych's arrangements were banned from being played after 1934) and other accredited to being the composer of Tripak - Oi Hop ty-ny-ny (original recorded by Sadowsky's choir in 1911 an arrangement of Kropovnytsky's). (Kabachok's son (in Bashtan's editorship of Memories of Kabachok K.1995) states that the person in the Poltava Capella who was a negative informer for the NKVD had migrated to Canada. None of the members of the Chorus moved to Canada. Nazarenko, Miniajlo and Panasenko moved to the United States. I feel from the evidence shown to me that the informant was probably Pika and that he also informed on Kabachok in 1937 after their tour of the Combined Bandurist Capella to Leningrad).
