= Combined Bandurist Capella =

Ukrainian bandurist ensemble

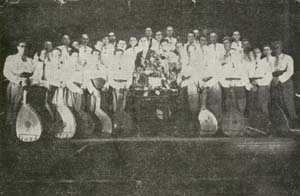
The Combined Bandurist Capella 1937 р. under the direction of D. Balatsky

The Combined Kiev Bandurist Capella, also known as the Ukrainian State Exemplary Bandurist Capella, was a Ukrainian bandurist ensemble in the Soviet Union which existed from 1935 to 1941, until it was disbanded due to World War II.

== History ==
The ensemble was formed in February 1935 by combining the musicians of the former Kiev Bandurist Capella, the Poltava Bandurist Capella and the Bandurist Capella of the Kiev Philharmonia to perform at the Decade of Ukrainian Culture in Moscow. This event was organized as a part of a change in policy that happened in 1934, a few months after the liquidation of all of the professional bandurist capellas.

The artistic director for this new larger bandurist capella was Mykola Mykhailov, the former director of the Kiev capella. His assistant was Danylo Pika, the former director of the Poltava Bandurist Capella. In March, the capella received a new title: "The Ukrainian State Exemplary Bandurist Capella".

The director of the new group was Zakhariy Aronsky, Administrator: I Nedolia.

In 1936 the Combined Capella performed in Moscow at the Decade of Ukrainian Culture in Moscow and recorded a number of disks there.

Mykhailov, however, died in 1937 during a tour of the Caucasus, in Tashkent. His death from angina was thought to have been suspicious.

In 1937 the group was made up of 24 members. By 1938, the group had grown to 44 artists.

In 1939, the ensemble was sent on a tour of Western Ukraine with a Ukrainian nationalistic program commemorating the 125th anniversary of Taras Shevchenko. The program was known as Slovo Tarasa. It included songs which had previously been banned by the Soviet censors and was specifically geared to entice the Western Ukrainian population to embrace the Soviet administration. The program however was not allowed to be performed in the areas that were previously formally part of the Soviet Union.

In 1941, the Nazi attack on the Soviet Union came when the Kiev Bandurist Capella was performing for the miners in Kryviy Rih. They returned through the chaos to Kiev where, on July 8, 1941, the chorus was disbanded and most of its members were mobilized. Within days some of the members, such as Danylo Pika and Mykola Opryshko, were killed on the front. Russian ensembles did not suffer the same fate. They remained intact to perform in front of the Soviet troops.

== Members ==
=== From the Poltava Capella ===
- Yakiv Kladovyj
- A. Kononenko (at that time was under arrest but joined later) later joined the post-war Kiev Capella
- T. Medvediv - died at the front in the first days of WWII
- S. Miniajlo - later joined the post-war Kiev Capella
- P. Miniajlo - emigrated with the Shevchenko Capella
- H. Nazarenko - emigrated with the Shevchenko Capella
- Yosyp Panasenko - emigrated with the Shevchenko Capella
- Danylo Pika - assistant director - died at the front in the first days of World War II
- Yakiv Protopopov - emigrated with the Shevchenko Capella, died in Germany

=== From the Kiev Philharmonia Bandurist Capella ===
- Olesiy Dziubenko - later joined the Shevchenko Chorus but returned to Ukraine.
- A. Fed'ko - arrested in 1937
- O. Kostetsky
- M. Mykhailiv - director of the group
- T. Pivko - emigrated with the Shevchenko chorus
- V. Pokhyl
- O. Shleyuk
- I. Tsybuliv - arrested in 1937

=== From other bandura groups ===
- E. Bazylevsky
- D. Balatsky - arrested in 1937
- V. Charivnyj - postwar Kiev Capella
- S. Hnylokvas - arrested in 1937. Postwar Kiev Capella, from the radio chorus.
- Hr. Kytastyj - emigrated with the Shevchenko Capella (1937)
- O. Ponomarenko
- Ya. Savchenko (V)
- M. Yarovyj - joined in 1936

== 1935-1941 conductors ==
Mykola Mykolayovych Mykhajlov (director 1935–36) was previously a member of the Kiev Capella from 1932 and director in 1934. He was a graduate of the Lysenko Music Institute. Became the conductor/director of the combined group from February 1935, until his death 16 July 1936 in Tashkent during the tour of the Caucuses from angina. His assistant was Danylo Pika.

Dmytro Yevhenovych Balatskyj (director 1937–38) (born 1902, died 1981) completed his studies at the Kiev Muz-dram institute in 1929. Director of the Kiev Bandurist Capella 1937–38. Arrested in 1938. Returned to Ukraine from Siberian Exile in 1947 moving to Odessa where he worked as a choral conductor. Author of the song "Rozpriahajte khloptsi koni".

Danylo Pika (director 1938–41). With the removal (arrest) of Balatsky, Pika again had a chance to become the artistic director of the chorus. Although he did not have a formal music education, he had for many years been the concertmaster of the Capella. Pika prepared the first "Slovo Tarasa" program in 1939 to coincide with the Shevchenko Jubilee and the tour of the recently acquired Western Ukrainian lands.
