= Leontovych Bandurist Capella =

Ukrainian folkloric ensemble

The Leontovych Bandurist Capella was a male choir whose members accompanied themselves using a Ukrainian folk instrument known as a bandura. It was established in the displaced persons camps in Germany in 1946 and had an active performance schedule until 1949.

In 1946, Hryhory Nazarenko together with the Honcharenko brothers left the Ukrainian Bandurist Chorus and started working on establishing a new bandurist capella. This new capella was formed in the British zone in Germany in the city of Goslar and was called the Leontovych Bandurist Capella after the Ukrainian composer Mykola Leontovych.

The Capella consisted of some 18 members taught and later directed by Hryhory Nazarenko. They played on diatonic Kharkiv-style banduras with the newly developed mechanisms designed by the Honcharenko brothers. Nazarenko busied himself writing out arrangements and repertoire from the works performed by the Poltava Bandurist Capella teaching Kharkiv-style playing. He coached the choir and taught the members to play the bandura, including many of the technical devices developed by Hnat Khotkevych.

Each of the members required instruments. The Honcharenko brothers set up a workshop in the DP camp where they were made and taught some of the members to make banduras.

The establishment of the Leontovych Capella was a very successful experiment. In the 1930s, Nazarenko was the concertmaster of the Poltava and later Combined Bandurist Capella. In this capacity he also was in charge of the music library often writing on the orchestral parts for all the performers. Because of this, Nazarenko was able to restore from his own memory a number of works by Hnat Khotkevych.

After successfully touring Germany with numerous concerts, many of the members joined up with the Ukrainian Bandurist Capella when they emigrated to the United States in 1949. Others migrated to England, South America and Australia where they were able to share their knowledge with the Ukrainian communities established there.
