= Volodymyr Kabachok =

Volodymyr Kabachok Володимир Кабачок
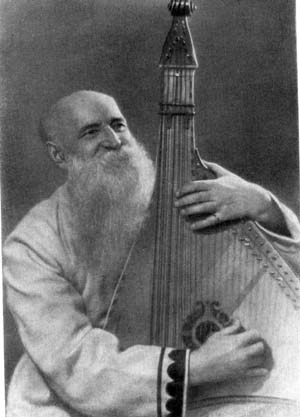

Background information
- Born: 15 July 1892; Petrivka, Russian Empire (present-day Ukraine)
- Died: 15 June 1957 (aged 64) Kiev, Ukrainian SSR, Soviet Union
- Genres: Classical
- Occupations: Musician, professor, conductor
- Instrument: Bandura

Volodymyr Andryievych Kabachok (Note: Ukrainian: Володимир Андрійович Кабачок, romanized: Volodymyr Andriiovych Kabachok) (Ukrainian: Володимир Андрійович Кабачок, July 15, 1892 – June 15, 1957) was a well-known bandura player and educator in Ukraine.

== Biography ==
Born in the village of Petrivka, in the Poltava region, Kabachok became a singer in the Archbishop's choir in Poltava until 1907 when he entered the Poltava music college.

Kabachok continued his music education at the Moscow conservatory (1913–17) studying Double Bass, (which did not require the payment of student fees). He did not complete the last year of this studies because of the outbreak of World War I. After the war he returned to Poltava where he initially conducted numerous choirs.

In 1925 he was one of the main proponents in establishing the Poltava Bandurist Capella, which he directed from its inception until January 1934. In January of that year, he was arrested and incarcerated for three months. Although he was released, he did not return to direct the Poltava Capella that he directed.

On release he moved to Leningrad where he was able to establish himself at the Gorky Drama Theatre directing a Ukrainian ethnographic choir. This ethnographic choir later was transformed by him into a bandurist capella modelled on the Poltava Bandurist Capella and playing on Kharkiv-style banduras.

After a performance of the Kiev Bandurist Capella in Leningrad in 1937, he was arrested once again and this time was sentenced to 10 years' hard labour in the Kolyma work camps in the Far East. It was incorrectly reported that he died in Kolyma.

In 1943-44 he was released, and worked for a short time as a soloist in the Tashkent Philharmonia. There he also became the leader of the orchestral group of the Veryovka Ukrainian Folk Choir.

He returned to Kiev in 1945 where he began to teach bandura at the Kiev music college named after Reinhold Glière and later became professor of bandura at the Kiev Conservatory. During his 12 years of teaching he training some 40 bandurists.

His most successful students and artistic accomplishment was the establishment of the female bandura trio ensemble. Kabachok is also known for his handbook for the bandura published posthumously in 1958. This bandura textbook was co-authored with non-bandurist Yevhen Yutsevych because it would have been difficult for a convicted political prisoner to have such a publication.

== Students ==
Tamara Polishchuk, Valentyna Tretiakova, Nina Pavlenko, E. Pylypenko-Mroniuk, V. Parkhomenko, Yu. Hamova, Viktor Kukhta, Serhiy Bashtan, A. Hrytsaj, V. Lapshyn, Bokovyj, Yulij Ivanovych Poklad, Maria Nykyforivna.

== Sources ==
- Bashtan, S. "Banduryste, orle syzyj." Literaturna Ukraina 1992, July 23. p. 8.
- Kabachok, Mykola. "Spohady pro bat'ka." Rodovid 6, 1993.
- Kudrytsky, A. V. "Mystetsvo Ukrainy." Biohrafichnyj dovidnyk, Kiev, 1997.
- Cheremsky, Kost'. Povernennia tradytsiyi. Kharkiv, 1999.
- Kyrdan, B., Omelchenko, A. Narodni spivtsi-muzykanty na Ukraini. Kiev, 1980.
- Zheplynsky, B. Kobzari banduristy. Lviv, 1999.
