= New York Bandura Ensemble =

New York based music ensemble

The New York Bandura Ensemble is a New York based music ensemble currently led by singer and bandurist Julian Kytasty. The ensemble is devoted to various forms and styles of Ukrainian music, from Renaissance and Baroque, through authentic folk, to contemporary and avantgarde music, presenting unusual repertoire through its "Bandura-Downtown" concert series. The ensemble plays an important role in preservation of Ukrainian folk music, as well as in dissemination thereof in North America. It has a longstanding residency at the Ukrainian Museum in New York City, and often collaborates with the Yara Arts Group.

The New York Bandura Ensemble has many different line-ups of musicians, depending on the nature of each project. Its members at various times include

- Julian Kytasty– music director.
- Natalia Honcharenko
- Michael Andrec
- Roman Turovsky
- Michael Alpert
- Gisburg
- Jurij Fedynskyj
- Ilya Temkin
- Victor Mishalow
- Frank London

The New York Bandura Ensemble receives support from the Center for Traditional Music and Dance and NYSCA.

== History ==
The ensemble was originally established as a children's ensemble by rev. Serhiy Pastukhiv in 1968. Under his direction the New York School of bandura and with it the New York Bandura Ensemble grew to encompass over 200 musicians and became a significant force in the Ukrainian community in New York.

In 1979 The ensemble was directed by Volodymyr Yurkevych before falling into the capable hands of Julian Kytasty. Under his direction the ensemble has gone through many transformations and recorded a number of CD's.
