= Mykola Mykhailov =

Ukrainian composer (1903–1936)

Mykola Mykhailov Микола Михайлов
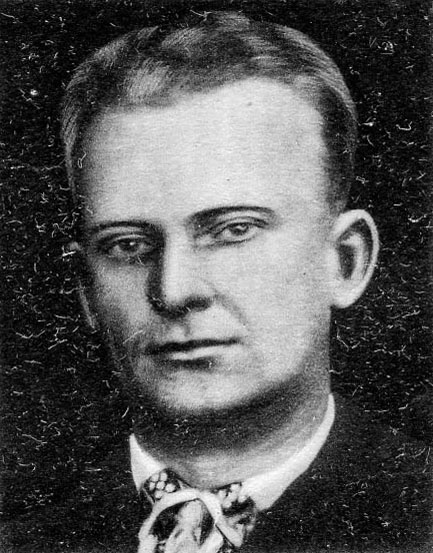
- Mykhailov in 1936

Background information
- Born: 1903
- Died: 16 June 1936 (aged 32–33) Tashkent, Uzbek SSR, Soviet Union
- Genres: Folk
- Occupations: Bandurist; Composer; Arranger
- Instrument: Bandura

Mykola Mykolayovych Mykhailov (Note: Ukrainian: Микола Миколайович Михайлов, romanized: Mykola Mykolaiovych Mykhailov) (1903 – 16 June 1936) was a Ukrainian bandurist, composer, and arranger.

== Biography ==
Born in 1903, Mykola Mykolailovych Mykhailov completed his studies at the Kiev Muz-dram Institute in 1929.

He joined the Kiev Bandurist Capella and in 1934 he became the artistic director of the ensemble. At that time it had ten performers. In February 1935, the Kiev Bandurist Capella was combined with members of the Poltava Bandurist Capella. Mykhailov was given the task of directing the Exemplary State Bandura Capella which now consisted of 29 performers.

He was the author of numerous arrangements and adaptions of works by other composers for the Capella.

Ethnically he was of mixed Russian-Greek extraction but proved himself a patriotic Ukrainian.

He died under strange circumstances during a tour of the Caucasus in Tashkent on 16 June 1936.
