= Hryhory Kytasty =

Ukrainian composer and conductor

Hero of Ukraine Hryhory Kytasty Григорій Китастий

Background information
- Born: January 17, 1907; Kobeliaky, Russian Empire
- Died: April 6, 1984 (aged 77)
- Occupations: Composer, conductor
- Instruments: Bandura
- Formerly of: Kyiv Bandurist Capella; Shevchenko Bandurist Capella; Ukrainian Bandurist Chorus

Hryhoriy Trokhymovych Kytasty (Ukrainian: Григорій Трохимович Китастий; January 17, 1907 – April 6, 1984) was a Ukrainian émigré composer and conductor. In 2008, he was honored with the Hero of Ukraine state award.

== Early years ==
Hryhory Kytasty was born in the town of Kobeliaky, Poltava Governorate. After completing initial music studies at the Poltava Musical College, Kytasty studied under Mykola Hrinchenko, Levko Revutsky and Viktor Kosenko at the Institute of Music and Drama named after Mykola Lysenko from 1930 to 1935 in Kyiv. He completed his studies there in composing and choral conducting. He also learned to play the bandura while studying in Kyiv.

== Bandura and the Kyiv State Bandurist Capella ==
After graduating in 1935, he was hired by the Kyiv Bandurist Capella. In 1937 he became concertmaster and in 1939 the assistant conductor. During this time Kytasty's first arrangements and compositions began to be played and recorded by the Capella.

With the Nazi invasion of the Soviet Union, the Kyiv State Bandurist Capella was disbanded and its members were mobilized to the front. Although recruited, H. Kytasty was able to avoid being sent to the front.

== Shevchenko Bandurist Capella in Europe ==
The members of the Kyiv Bandurist Capella who had survived, during the German occupation re-established a professional ensemble. In 1942 Kytasty became the artistic director of this reconstituted Bandurist Capella which in time became known as the Shevchenko Bandurist Capella. During the course of the war the Capella toured Western Ukraine and Volyn and was later in Germany to perform for the Ost-arbeiters. In Germany, after initially being incarcerated in Hamburg, they were released to perform for the Ostarbeiters housed in special work camps in order help raise the productivity of those who worked in near slave-like conditions.

It is in Germany that the Shevchenko Bandurist Capella finds itself at the end of the war. Because of the brutal manner in which Ukrainian artists were treated under the Stalinist regime, and the fact that many bandurists had suffered directly or had witnessed unfounded reprisals under the Soviet regime, the Chorus as a group decided not to return to Soviet Ukraine and in 1949 emigrated as a group to the United States. Another significant reason for emigration was justified fear of persecution for collaborating with the Nazis during the occupation.

== Ukrainian Bandurist Chorus in Detroit ==
Hryhoriy Kytasty's grave in South Bound Brook, New Jersey.

In 1949 H. Kytasty emigrated to the United States, settling initially with the rest of the Chorus in Detroit. In the United States the Shevchenko Bandurist Capella changed its name in English to the Ukrainian Bandurist Chorus.

In 1958, H. Kytasty toured Europe as a co-director with Volodymir Bozhyk of the Ukrainian Bandurist Chorus. Although the tour was an artistic success, it did not allow the group to return to professional status. Upon returning to the United States, Kytasty left the Chorus and moved to San Diego and continued composing. In 1964 he left San Diego and moved first to Minneapolis and then Chicago, finally settling in Cleveland. In 1967 he returned to the Ukrainian Bandurist Chorus as conductor and music director, a post he held until his death in 1984 due to cancer. At his return in 1967, he brought to the Chorus his monumental work Battle of Konotop, which was recorded and performed on tour to celebrate the Chorus' 50th Anniversary in 1968.

H. Kytasty is buried at a large Ukrainian Orthodox cemetery behind St. Andrew's Memorial Church in South Bound Brook, New Jersey. His grave can be found in the front row on the left side of the cemetery (opposite the parking lot).

Notable students of Hryhory Kytasty were his sons Victor Kytasty, Andrij Kytasty, Mykola Deychakiwsky, Marko Farion among others.

== Works ==
=== Compositions and arrangements ===
Kytasty is known as a composer who captured the spirit of the Ukrainian emigration who were branded Displaced Persons from Eastern Europe, reflecting the aspirations of the Western Ukrainian Diaspora. His musical arrangements and compositions can be divided up into three periods: I) Soviet period (from 1934 to 1942) 2) War and post war period (from 1942 to 1958) 3) Diaspora period (from 1958 to 1984).

Initially he composed works which reflected the needs and tastes of the Soviet environment in which he was educated and lived, composing soviet political works such as the Song of the NKVD and the Chekist and folkloric arrangements that reflected the government's approach to Ukrainian culture and song.

In the World War II and immediate post–World War II period, he composed and arranged songs which reflected the struggle of the Ukrainian people against communist dictatorship and tyranny. His compositions from this period are considered to be very nationalistic.

In his third period, when it became apparent that the Soviet Union would not flounder soon, his compositions became more subtle and lyrical and reflected a longing for his homeland. (Yak davno), (Ne shkoduyu) and lost youth.

His instrumental bandura works demonstrate a knowledge of effective devices on the bandura.

=== Recordings ===
Hryhory Kytasty's first recorded arrangement was "Oj nastupyla ta chorna khmara" recorded by the Kyiv Bandurist Chorus directed by Danylo Pika in 1939 (record number B8691). The reverse of the record has "Oj za hory zza lymanu" arranged by M. Mykhailov (record number B8692).

Kytasty's arrangement of the Ukrainian folk song "A mij mylyj umer" was recorded by the Kyiv State Bandurist Chorus and released in 1937 (#5168).

Before World War II Kytasty recorded as a member of a bandura quintet an instrumental Polka with D. Pika, V. Savchenko, S. Minialo, and O. Kostetsky. This recording was released a number of times in 1937 and 1940 (record # 5169 and 5149).

== Sources ==
Kudrytsky, A. V. – Mystetstvo Ukrainy – Biohrafichnyj dovidnyk, K, 1997
