= Alexis Kochan =

Ukrainian–Canadian composer and singer (born 1953)

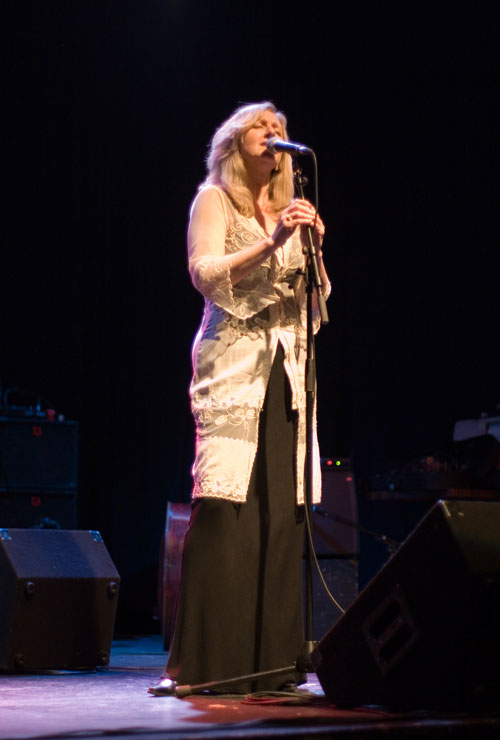
- Alexis Kochan performing with Paris to Kyiv, Winnipeg. Photo by Craig Koshyk

Background information
- Born: Canada
- Origin: Winnipeg, Manitoba, Canada
- Genres: Folk music
- Occupation: Singer-songwriter
- Instruments: Vocals, piano, accordion, banjo
- Website: www.paristokyiv.com

Alexis Kochan (Ukrainian: Алексіс Коxан) is a Ukrainian–Canadian composer and singer. She was born in 1953 in Winnipeg, Manitoba, to Ukrainian immigrants.

== Biography ==
Singer Alexis Kochan was born in 1953 and raised in Winnipeg's North End. She earned a master's degree in psychology from the University of Manitoba in 1977 while studying music and beginning a multi-faceted career as singer, teacher, producer, and recording artist. In 1978–1979 she lived in Kiev, Ukraine where she studied with the Veriovka Folk Ensemble and composer/conductor Anatoly Avdievsky. While in Ukraine she began to collect old Ukrainian folk songs that she was hearing for the first time.

Ms. Kochan's interest in giving new life to these archaic fragments led directly to her first recording, 'Czarivna' (The Princess), an album of songs connected with ancient seasonal rituals, produced in 1982 with Arthur Polson and the principal players of the Winnipeg Symphony Orchestra. In 1992 she formed Paris To Kyiv, a musical project with a rotating collection of musical collaborators. These include bandurist Julian Kytasty and jazz violist Richard Moody who have formed the core of Paris To Kyiv for the last ten years as well as many others such as Ukrainian saxophonist Sasha Boychouk, Persian master percussionist Pejman Hadadi, John Wyre of Nexus (percussion ensemble), Celtic multi-instrumentalist Martin Colledge and Serbian bassist Nenad Zdjelar. Since 1994, Kochan has released four Paris To Kyiv titles: Paris To Kiev (1994), Variances (1996), Prairie Nights and Peacock Feathers (2000), and Fragmenti (2005).

Alexis Kochan also co-directed (with Michael Alpert and Alan Bern of Brave Old World) and performed in 'Night Songs from a Neighbouring Village', a program exploring the commonalities and contrasts between Ukrainian music and the musical traditions of the Jews of Ukraine. 'Night Songs' was created for the Jewish Museum (New York) in 1994. Other performances have included Ashkenaz in Toronto (1995), Tage Der Jiddischen Kultur in Berlin (1996), the World Music Institute at Symphony Space in New York City (1999) and Yiddishkayt at the John Anson Ford Amphitheatre in Hollywood, California (2000).

Her musical theatre credits include the world premiere of Warren Sulatycky's play 'Babas' at the Persephone Theatre in Saskatoon in 1994, where Ms. Kochan worked with Canadian Hungarian director Tibor Feheregyhazi and performed a number of the songs from her 'Czarivna' and Paris To Kyiv' recordings. Television and film rights to her work have been acquired by the CBC for 'Canada: A People's History' and by the popular television series 'PSI Factor' for her song 'Kant'. Most recently her music appears in films by Alan Pakarnyk (Polyphonic Songs), Danishka Esterhazy and Bobby Leigh ('Dark Bird' and 'Call'). She has also worked with Shumka (2006) and Rusalka, Canadian Ukrainian dance ensembles of international note, who have created dance works based on her songs.

As an educator, Ms. Kochan has led master classes in singing and Ukrainian folk polyphony and conducted numerous workshops and music camps in Canada, the United States, and Europe. She has worked with groups of women, choirs, and in 2003, a group of actor/singers at the Jagiellonian University in Kraków, Poland. She speaks and writes about cultural politics and the importance of the arts in education, and her special interest 'ethnicity, artmaking, and the Ukrainian folk song'.

== General information ==
At three Alexis became a member of her Ukrainian church choir in Winnipeg's North End. At five, she debuted as a soloist.

She was selected to sing with Walter Klymkiw in the Olexander Koshetz Choir. She studied piano, completed music programs and by 13 was playing guitar and performing in folk clubs.

At the University of Manitoba she studied psychology. She completed a master's degree, began a doctorate and practiced as a psychologist for some years.

In the late seventies Alexis was offered an internship in Ukraine with the Ukrainian folk music ensemble Veryovka. Shortly after this she began composing music based on old Ukrainian songs and fragments. This led to her first recording Czarivna in 1982. Produced with Arthur Polson and principal players from the Winnipeg Symphony Orchestra, the collection paired ancient ritual songs with an orchestral sound.

In the early nineties Alexis formed Paris To Kyiv – a musical ensemble with a rotating collection of musicians including bandurist Julian Kytasty and jazz violist Richard Moody who have formed the core of Paris To Kyiv for the last 10 years.

== Discography ==
- Alexis Kochan: Царівна (Czarivna) (1982) «Olesia Records»
- Paris To Kiev: Paris To Kiev (1994) «Olesia Records»
- Paris To Kyiv: Variances (1996) «Olesia Records»
- Paris To Kyiv: Prairie Nights and Peacock Feathers (2000) «Olesia Records»
- Paris To Kyiv: Фраґменти (Fragmenti) (2005)

== Notable live performances ==
- Harvard and Yale Universities (1997)
- Carpenter Centre in Long Beach, CA (1998)
- French Embassy in Washington, DC (1999)
- University of California, Santa Barbara and at the Skirball Centre in LA (2000)
- Yara Arts Group of La Mama Theatre in New York City (2001)
- Centre for Theatre Practices in Gardzienice and Lublin, Poland (2001)
- Rolston Recital Hall at the Banff Centre for the Arts (2002)
- Ring Ring Festival in Belgrade, at the Teatr Maly in Warsaw (2003)
- Centrum Kultury Zydowskiej in Kraków (2003)
- Osrodek Badan Tworczosci Jerzego Grotowskiego i Poszukiwan Teatralno-Kulturowych in Wroclaw (2003)
- Dakh and Podil Theatres in Kyiv (2003)
- Philharmonia in Chernihiv (2003)
- Bowery Poetry Club in New York City (2004)
- Nakasuk School in Iqaluit, Nunavut (2005)
