= Gisburg =

Gisburg (born Gisburg Smialek, in Salzburg, Austria) is an Austrian composer, singer, and music editor for film.

== Biography ==
Gisburg was born in Salzburg, Austria. She began studying modern music theater with Dieter Schnebel and was touring internationally as a concert singer with his vocal group Die Maulwerker. She attended the Berlin University as a guest student for composition and modern music theatre with Prof. Dieter Schnebel and Prof. Witold Szalonek and for visual arts with Eva Maria Schön. She moved to New York City in 1992 and performed around the Knitting factory and Roulette scene, collaborating with Julian Kytasty and John Zorn. She recorded albums for Tzadik. and GP music. She was a member of the Chinese Hai-Tien choir with Mrs. Pi-Chu Hsiao for 6 years, and recorded Chinese pop music of the 1930s and 1950s.

She scored several music scores for films and works as a music editor in NYC. She is also the co-founder of the Filmette Film Festival, with Drew Pisarra and Loui Terrier. Filmette is a Film Festival which champions films outside the usual Festival time constraints.

She is an adjunct teacher for sound and music in film at the Pratt Institute, NYC.
