= Julian Kytasty =

American kobzar, bandurist, and flautist

- Юліян Китастий
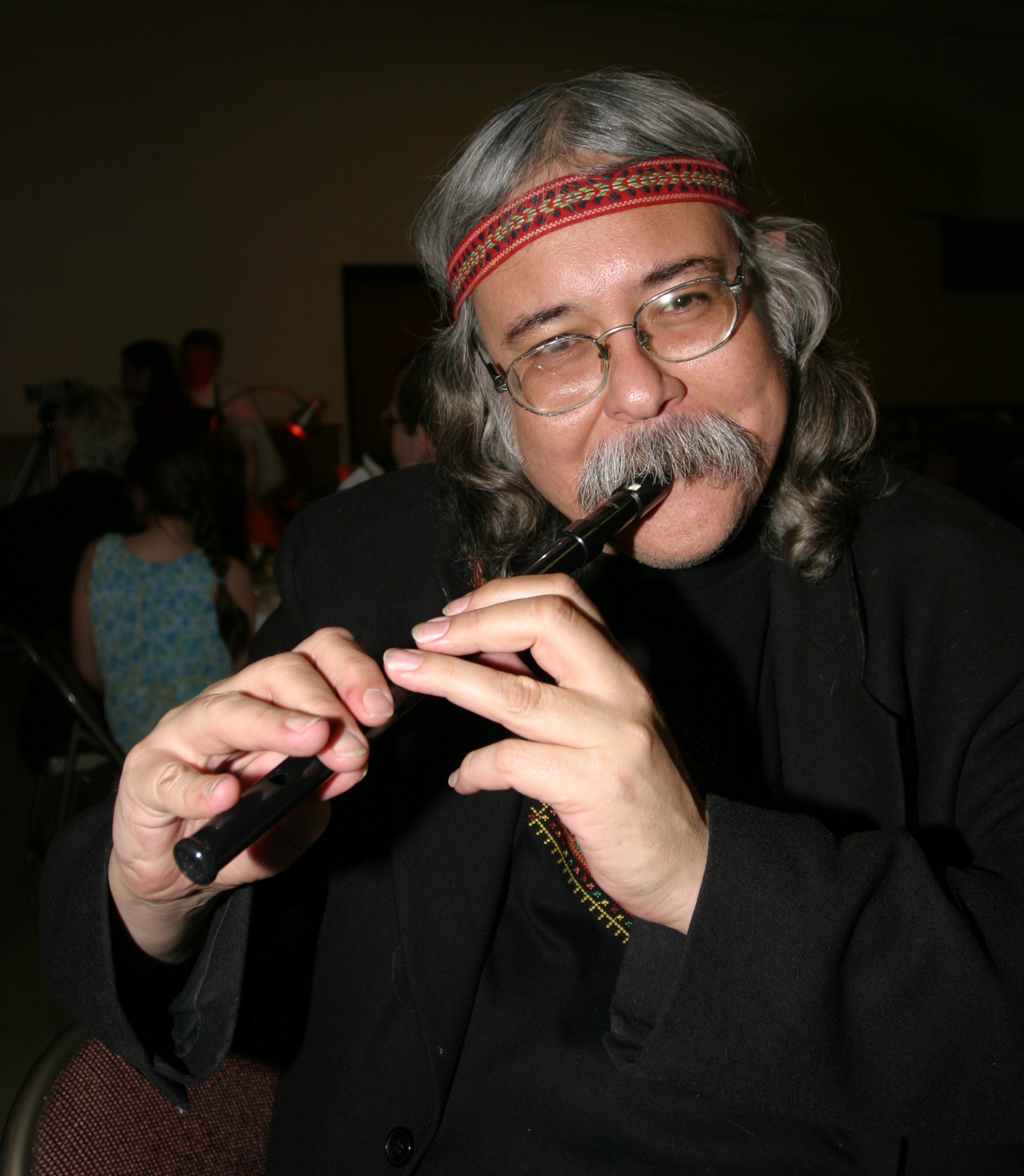
- Born: January 23, 1958 (age 68); Detroit, Michigan, United States
- Occupations: Composer, singer, kobzar, conductor

Julian Petrovych Kytasty (Note: Ukrainian: Юліян Петрович Китастий, romanized: Yuliian Petrovych Kytastyi) is an American composer, singer, kobzar, bandurist, flautist, and conductor of Ukrainian descent. He was born January 23, 1958, in Detroit, Michigan, in a family of refugees.

== Biography ==
His first studies were in the Ukrainian Bandurist Chorus, in which his father, uncles and grandfather played in and conducted before him. He has been a resident of New York City since 1980. He moved there to found the New York Bandura Ensemble (which also at various times included minimalist composer-bandurist Michael Andrec, composer-lutenist Roman Turovsky-Savchuk, vocalists Gisburg and Natalia Honcharenko, and kobzar Jurij Fedynskyj), and began a career as a solo artist and bandura teacher that has taken him all over the world, from the Inuit lands to Patagonia. In 1989 he was invited to tour Ukraine, performing over a hundred concerts as a soloist as well as with a bandura ensemble, participating in the Chervona Ruta festival.

The Experimental Bandura Trio – Jurij Fedynskyj, Julian Kytasty and Michael Andrec

Kytasty holds a master's degree in music (Composition, Theory and Voice) from Concordia University in Montreal (his undergraduate studies were in military history). He is the author of original compositions and arrangements that have entered the standard repertoire of bandurists around the world. He has been described as "the finest representative of the kobzar tradition in the Western Hemisphere".

He has also created and conducted avant-garde music for instrumental groups, choirs, and incidental music for dance and theatrical performances, notably for New York's Yara Arts Group in collaboration with Virlana Tkacz. Julian is a frequent speaker on the bandura and its tradition.

He has been a guest lecturer at many universities including Yale, Harvard, Wesleyan, and the University of California.

Kytasty has recorded for London's November Music label: Black Sea Winds – Music of the Kobzari of Ukraine. He also has collaborated with Canadian singer Alexis Kochan and their ensemble Paris to Kyiv on two CDs, Chinese pipa player Wu Man, Mariana Sadovska, Brave Old World and has recorded with his own group The Experimental Bandura Trio.

In 2003 he recorded a solo interpretation on the bandura of John Zorn's composition "Kadmut" which can be found on the third volume of the Masada 10 Years Special Edition entitled "The Unknown Masada" (Tzadik 7181).

== Discography ==
- "Ukrainian Bandurist" 1986 (Yevshan Records)
- "Experimental Bandura Trio" 2000
- "Prairie Nights and Peacock Feathers" 2000 (Paris to Kyiv, Olesia Records)
- "Black Sea Winds" 2002 (NVR 1012-2)
- "Masada Anniversary Edition Volume 3: The Unknown Masada" 2003 (John Zorn)
- "Variances" 2003 (Paris To Kyiv, SRI Canada)
- "Fragmenti" 2005 (Paris to Kyiv, Olesia Records)
- "Wu Man and Friends" 2005 (Wu Man)
- "Hryhory Kytasty" (PRB Records)
- "Гомін Степів" (Yevshan CDYFP1036)
- "Night Songs From a Neighboring Village" 2014 (Oriente Records)
- "Songs Of Truth" 2014 (Centre for Cape Breton Studies)
- "Nochi v Banduristani (Nights in Banduristan)" 2017
- "Disturbance Fields" (Julian Kytasty and Alla Zagaykevych) 2017
