= Poltava Bandurist Capella =

Ukrainian vocal-instrumental ensemble

The Poltava Bandurist Capella was vocal-instrumental ensemble who accompanied themselves on the multi-stringed Ukrainian bandura. It was initially established in February 1925, based on a male church choir who sang in the Ukrainian Autocephalous Orthodox Cathedral in Poltava under the direction of Fedir (Khvedir) Popadych. The ensemble was disbanded in October 1934.

== History ==
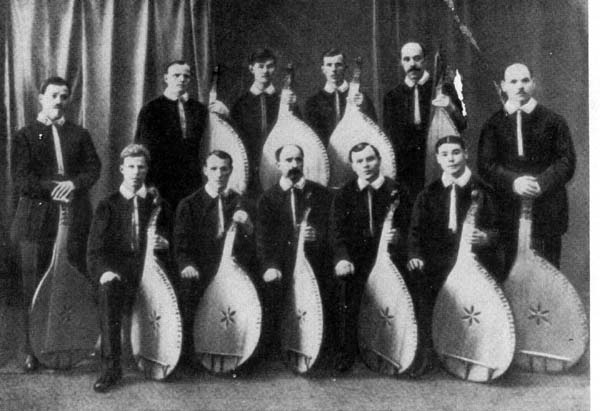
Poltava Bandurist Capella 1928 with Kyiv style banduras made in 1927 by Poltava bandura maker M. Domnenko.

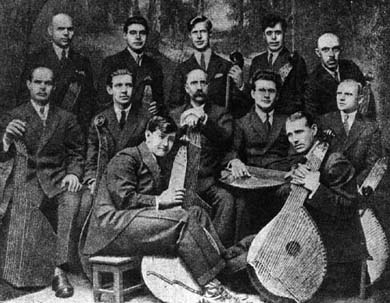
The Poltava Bandurist Capella 1930 with new diatonic Kharkiv style banduras designed by L. Haydamaka and made by bandura maker H. Palyivetz.

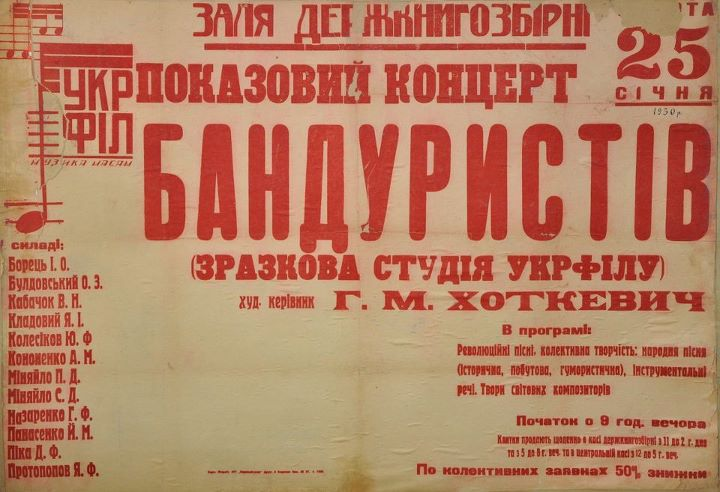
Concert poster of Poltava Bandurist Capella under the artistic direction of Hnat Khotkevych from January 1930

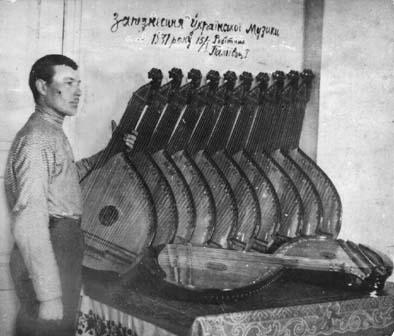
New Kharkiv banduras made by H. Paliyivetz for the Poltava Capella in 1931 specially for the North American tour. Note the retuning and dampening mechanisms.

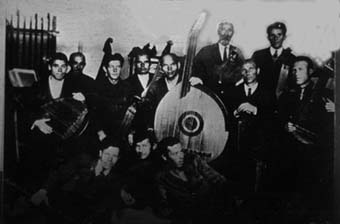
Poltava Bandurist Capella 1933. Note use of Bass bandura

=== Initial set up ===
The Capella's first rehearsals as a bandurist ensemble were sponsored by the HubSelBud (Regional Village Housing organization). The formation of the Poltava Bandurist Capella was inspired by a visit to Poltava by the kobzar (itinerant Ukrainian bard) Ivan Kuchuhura Kucherenko who was also their first instructor. It was also inspired by a performance by the Kyiv Bandurist Capella which had performed in Poltava and also information in the press of the establishment of a bandura school and Bandurist Capella in Prague.

Initially the members of the group played on borrowed instruments. One of the major problems of these instruments was trying to keep them in tune as many had wooden tuning pegs which were not reliable and were difficult to finely tune the instrument. Initially they performed part of their concerts without bandura accompaniment, sometimes accompanied by the piano. The only member of the Capella who had prior experience with the bandura was Danylo Pika who had taken some bandura lessons from Opanas Slastion.

From 21 December 1926 until 1 October 1928, the ensemble was known as the "Bandura Studio of the Poltava Region Bureau of Political Education". Its first performance took place at the opening of the Taras Shevchenko monument in Poltava in 1926.

=== Professional status ===
After a successful performance in Odessa the eleven members of the Capella ordered new banduras and in 1927 received new semi-chromatic Kiev type instruments made by Poltava bandura maker M. Domnenko.

In 1928, despite the amateur status of the Capella and the fact that they could only perform in their free time from work, the Capella had some 85 works in their repertoire which they accompanied by bandura and piano. The ensemble gave 249 concerts before 122,825 listeners performing in Poltava and regions, the Donbas, Odessa, Kharkiv, Kremenchuk, Romny, Kherson and Mykolayiv.

=== Studio under Hnat Khotkevych ===
On 1 October 1928, the Capella was chosen by the People's Commissariat for Education to work with bandura specialist Hnat Khotkevych to form a special experimental studio for the development of bandura technique and repertoire. The members switched over to diatonic Kharkiv instruments made by Poltava bandura maker - Hryhory Paliyevetz. The Capella had its name changed to the "Exemplary Bandura Studio of UKRFIL".

The eleven members of the Studio were joined by a twelfth - Ivan Boretz in 1928, who came to study at the studio from the Kharkiv Bandurist Capella.

The studio functioned for 18 months. Each week Volodymyr Kabachok would travel to Kharkiv from Poltava to pick up the weeks assignments from Khotkevych. Khotkevych would visit once a month to review the progress of the students. The technique of the members of the Capella grew considerably and the new repertoire composed and arranged by Hnat Khotkevych opened up new aspects of the bandura previously never explored. Over 20 new pieces were prepared. These included such works as the "Poem about Bayda", and the "Duma: Storm on the Black Sea".

At the completion of the studio period with Hnat Khotkevych the group had a concert examination in Kharkiv at the Korolenko Library Auditorium on 22 January 1930, attended by musical dignitaries of Ukraine. After a successful performance the members began to work professionally as artists in a full-time capacity. After the performance the Capella was renamed "The State Exemplary Bandura Capella of the Ukrainian SSR".

In 1930 concerts were planned with the Capella being accompanied by a symphonic orchestra. Khotkevych made preparations composing a number of works for the Capella with full symphonic accompaniment. The performance however did not take place. This period coincides with a growing period of anti-Ukrainian actions by the Soviet government.

=== Concert exploitation ===
In 1931, after a successful performances in Moscow, the ensemble was chosen to be the first artistic group from the Soviet Union to tour North America. In order to prepare for a tour of the United States the received new instruments with tuning mechanism and dampening mechanisms made by Hryhorij Paliyevetz. Despite a deposit of $15,000 being paid, the announced tour did not take place.

Instead, the group was exploited by UkrFil (The Ukrainian Philharmonic concert organization) giving some 28 concerts a month. Most of the concerts seemed to take place in areas which had little interest in the bandura and bandura music. Severe restrictions were also place on the repertoire redirecting the group away from historic repertoire and focussing more on Soviet mass songs.

For a brief time however, the ensemble became extremely popular and demonstrated the direction for further development of the bandura for many years to come.

=== Persecution ===
In 1932 Hnat Khotkevych fell out of favour with the authorities. His compositions and arrangements were removed from the list of allowed works for performance in Ukraine. The members of the Capella also came under considerable pressure, being repeatedly taken for questioning by the NKVD (the Soviet secret police).

In January 1934 the artistic director, Volodymyr Kabachok, was arrested after a concert by the Capella in Kiev and did not return to the group. With his arrest most of the scores used by the Capella which included many original handwritten manuscripts composed and arranged by Hnat Khotkevych specifically for the group were confiscated. With Kabachok's arrest the directorship of the Capella fell to Danylo Pika, who was not as strong an administrator. After many months of not being paid (from January–October) the Capella was forced to disband in October 1934.

In 1935 some of the members moved to Kiev and worked under the protection of the Dumka Chorus and its conductor - Nestor Horodyvenko. In March 1935 some of the members of the Poltava Bandurist Capella participated in the formation of a new larger Kiev Bandurist Capella under the direction of Mykola Mykhailov.

== Recordings ==
Under the direction of Volodymyr Kabachok the Poltava Bandurist Capella recorded a number of records. In 1933 the following songs were released in editions of 2500 copies:

- Pip ta Popadia - arr. by H. Khotkevych #2578
- Na horodi Verba riasna - arr. Demutsky #2582
- Horlytsia - #2379
- Oi ty ziron'ko vechirniaia - arr. Lysenko #2580
- Ohirochky - arr: Studnytsky #2581
- V misiatsi ilui vypala porosha arr. H. Khotkevych - #2583

These same recordings were re-issued in 1934 in 2000 copies.

== Legacy ==
Despite its short history, the legacy of the Poltava Bandurist Capella is significant. It pioneered the Kharkiv style of playing the bandura within a bandurist capella which allowed the use of unique technical devices not possible on other instruments. The repertoire was symphonic in its concept and implementation. Refinements in instrument construction developed by members of the Capella can be seen in instruments being constructed today.

== Membership ==
1. Volodymyr Kabachok - arrested in 1934, sent to Kolyma
2. Hryhory Nazarenko - emigrated to USA
3. Ivan Boretz, (1929–31) - shot in 1937
4. Oles Buldovsky,(1925–34) - died on the front
5. Yakiv Kladovy, (1925–34) - arrested in 1938
6. Yuri Kolesnykiv, (1925–34) - member of the UBC
7. Andriy Kononenko, (1925–34) - member of KBC
8. Tymofiy Medvediv, (1932–34) - died on the front in 1943
9. Pavlo Minialo, (1925–34) - member of the UBC
10. Serhiy Minialo, (1925–34) - member of KBC
11. Yosyp Panasenko, (1925–34) - member of the UBC
12. Danylo Pika, (1925–34) - died on the front in 1943
13. Yakiv Protopopov,(1925–34) - died in Germany 1944
14. Oles Shramko - arrested in 1928
