= Kyiv Bandurist Capella =

Ukrainian vocal-instrumental ensemble

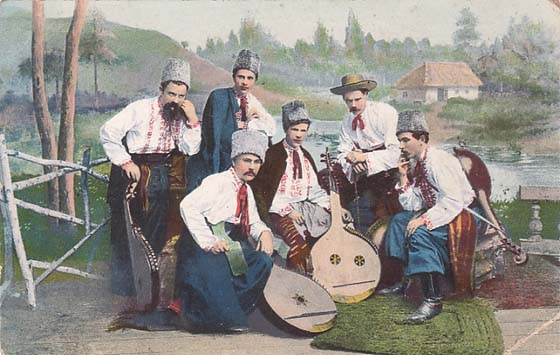
Student bandurist ensemble from Kyiv, c. 1908, directed by Mykhailo Domontovych.

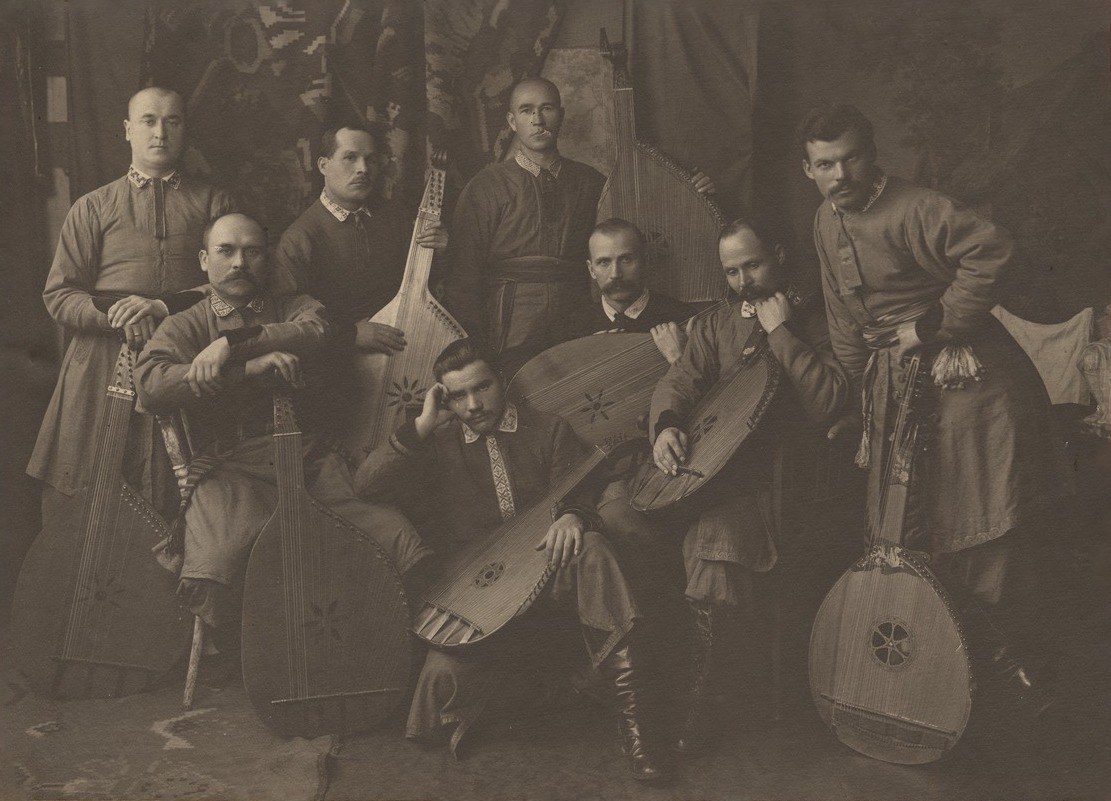
The Kyiv Bandurist Capella, 1924.

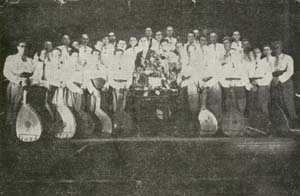
The Kyiv Bandurist Capella under the direction of D. Balatsky, 1937.

The Kyiv Bandurist Capella (Ukrainian: Київська капeла бандуристiв, romanized: Kyivs’ka kapela banduristiv) is a male vocal-instrumental ensemble that accompanies its singing with the playing of the multi-stringed Ukrainian folk instrument known as the bandura.

The group was initially known as the Kobzar Choir and was established in August 1918 under the direction of the renowned bandurist virtuoso Vasyl Yemetz, having its first performance in November that year. The group continues to actively perform to this day as the Ukrainian Bandurist Chorus.

== History ==
=== Preamble ===
The idea of organizing a bandura ensemble came to V. Yemetz after seeing a performance by four kobzars in Okhtyrka: Ivan Kuchuhura Kucherenko, Pavlo Hashchenko, Petro Drevchenko and Oleksander Hamaliya on 20 August 1911. In some of the pieces, the kobzars were joined by the lira player Sampson Vesely. This performance seemed to have been the catalyst for the formation of the first Kobzar Choir.

Initially, Yemetz tried to organize a Bandurist Capella in Kharkiv from his students in 1913. His next attempt was with his students in the historic Kuban region in 1913–1914 in Yekaterinodar, but none of these attempts was fully successful. This could have been possible due to the youth and inexperience of Yemetz himself. In 1914, Yemetz travelled to Moscow where he had the chance to see the bandura ensemble that was organized by Vasyl Shevchenko. He was also aware of the student bandura ensemble organized by Mykhailo Domontovych in Kyiv in 1905.

=== Organization ===
In April 1917, Yemetz first visited Kyiv travelling there as a delegate to the First Ukrainian Congress. After a brief return to Kharkiv, he settled in Kyiv. In May 1918, he placed advertisements in the Kyiv newspapers Vidrodzhennia, Robitnycha hazeta and Narodna volia asking for interested persons to approach him with the intent of organizing a kobzar ensemble.

A number of bandurists answered these advertisements and they had their initial gathering in June of that year. Altogether 18 people came to the first meeting. Each had varied playing levels, musical knowledge, and technical proficiency. Each played different styles of bandura made by various makers. The Chernihiv-style was chosen over the Kharkiv-style by Yemetz as being easier for everyone to initially master. A standard tuning had to be chosen which initially also proved problematic. Some of those initially interested dropped out because they could not read music and thought that playing from music was not traditional.

The group was initially known as the Kobzar Choir (Kobzarsky khor) and later Kobzar Capella (Kapela Kobzariv). Yemetz states that the word bandurist was not used at all at that time.

=== First performance ===
After a few months of rehearsing, the ensemble was ready for their concert début. This also proved problematic because none of the bandurists had the money to pay the rent required for a concert hall in Kyiv. This obstacle was overcome by the direct intervention of Hetman Pavlo Skoropadsky. Before their first independent concert, they had a chance of performing as a group at the Hetman's Palace. After hearing them perform, Hetman Skoropadsky was so moved that he made sure that the rental fee was paid for the use of the second largest hall in Kyiv after the Opera Hall – the Bergonie Theatre (now known as the Lesya Ukrainka Theatre). The première concert of the Kyiv Kobzar Choir took place on 3 November 1918.

The program given by Yemetz for the first concert included the following pieces:

1. Kozatskiy pokhid (Hey nu khloptsi do zbroyi) arrangement V. Yemetz – (Instrumental)
2. Pro Morozenka (solo)
3. Ta lita orel – arrangement V. Yemetz
4. Duma – Pro smert' kozaka bandurysta (solo)
5. Hey na hori ta zhentsi zhnut' – arrangement V. Yemetz
6. My hajdamaky
7. Ya siohodni shchos' duzhe sumuyu (solo)
8. Vyklyk – Arrangement V. Yemetz – Instrumental
9. Hopak (by M. Kropovnytsky) – Instrumental
10. Tarasova nich (solo) – V. Yemetz
11. Oy shchozh to za shum – uchynyvsia – arrangement V. Yemetz
12. Kyselyk (solo)
13. Ta vzhe rokiv dvisti
14. Hey ne dyvuyte dobriyi liudy
15. Oy za hayem, hayem
16. Horlytsia – Instrumental
17. Hrechanyky

"Kozatskiy Pokhid (Hey nu khloptsi do zbroyi)" and "Vyklyk" are still played by many bandurists in North America although the pieces are often ascribed to bandurist Mykhailo Teliha, a Kuban Cossack and a member of this initial Kobzar Choir. Teliha was also a student of Vasyl Yemetz. These works were recorded by Teliha by a Polish record company "Syrena Elektro" and were published in a collection of bandura works in Prague in 1926.

The concert was a resounding success. The music section of the Directive of Culture and Art of the Ministry of Education of Ukraine commissioned a project to fund the chorus, open a bandura school, a hostel for blind kobzars, a workshop for the manufacture of banduras, and the formation of a kobzar museum.

Other concerts followed in the Shuliavka neighbourhood and in what is now known as the National Philharmonic on European Square of Khreschatyk. Yemetz was also invited to teach bandura at the Ukrainian Music Institute in Kyiv which later became the Kyiv Conservatory. Numerous performances followed for the members in the Ukrainian Army.

Their final performance took place at a concert dedicated to the memory of Taras Shevchenko in Kyiv in 1919. After this, the political situation in Kyiv changed dramatically and the group disbanded. Yemetz travelled to Prague where he established a bandura school and a second bandurist chorus in 1923 which initially received excellent reviews in the Soviet Ukrainian music magazines in 1925.

=== Membership ===
Yemetz states that the Kobzar Choir initially had 7 only members:

- Vasyl Yemetz (director), moved to Prague, then the United States.
- Hryhoriy Kopan (1887–1938), a student of V. Potapenko; arrested and shot in 1938.
- Khvedir Dibrova, Kuban Cossack; shot in 1919.
- Fedir Doroshko (1888–1938), arrested and shot in 1938.
- M. Panchenko, arrested and disappeared, later presumed shot.
- Andriy Slidiuk, post office worker; shot in the spring of 1919 in Starokonstantynivka.
- Mykhailo Teliha, Kuban Cossack; emigrated to Prague, shot by Germans in 1942.

Yemetz does not remember the participation of Oleksiy Dziubenko (who by other accounts joined the Kyiv Bandurist Chorus in 1925) nor Hryhoriy Andriychyk, Josyp Snizhniy, or Vasyl' Potapenko.

Bandurist and professor Mykola Shchohol gives the names of the members of the reconstituted group formed in 1923 as:

- Hryhoriy Andriychyk, arrested in 1937.
- Fedir Doroshko, shot 1938.
- Hryhoriy Kopan, shot 1938.
- M. Panchenko, arrested and disappeared
- Marko Kashuba, also a student of V. Potapenko and the organizer of a bandurist chorus in Kharkiv in 1925. Arrested and shot in 1938.
- H. Tsebrenko, shot in 1938.

Of the original members whom Yemetz remembered, only three were in the re-established group: Doroshko, Kopan and Panchenko.

The fate of the participants of the first Kyiv Kobzar Choir does not seem to be a very happy one:

- Hryhoriy Kopan (1887–1938), a student of V. Potapenko; was arrested by the GPU in 1930 and again on 19 March 1938. He was shot on 28 April 1938 at 23.00.
- Fedir Doroshko, arrested on 15 February 1937 as a leader of a counter-revolutionary group and shot on 28 April 1938 at 23.00.
- Andriy Slidiuk, post office worker; was shot by the Bolsheviks in the spring of 1919.
- Khvedir Dibrova, Kuban Cossack from Krasnodar, and student of Vasyl Yemetz. Shot in 1919.
- M. Panchenko, arrested and later disappeared.
- Mykhailo Teliha (1900–1942), Kuban Cossack; emigrated to Prague, and later performed throughout Western Ukraine and Poland. He was shot by the Nazis in 1942 with his poet wife Olena in the Babi Yar massacre in Kyiv.

The only one that survived and did not die a violent death was director Vasyl Yemetz (1891–1982), who emigrated from Ukraine, moved to Prague and then settled in the United States.

There are no known photographs of the first Kyiv Bandurist Capella known as the Kobzar Choir, however a photograph of a poster from 1919 was included in Omelchenko's Candidates dissertation on the history and development of the bandura.
