= Western constituency (Krasnodar Krai) =

Legislative constituency in Krasnodar Krai, Russia

Western single-member constituency
- Constituency of the Russian State Duma

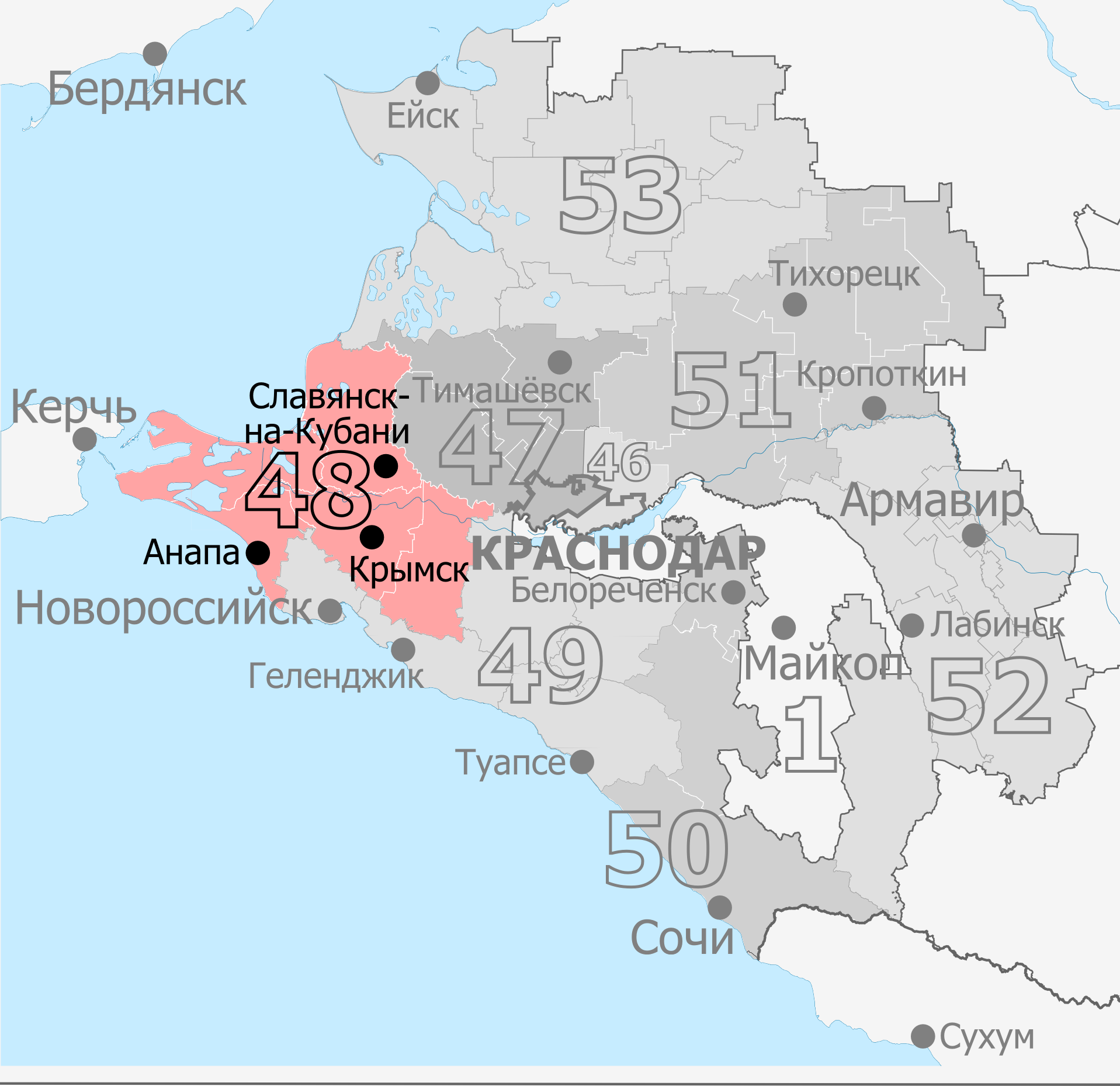
- Constituency boundaries since 2016
- Deputy: Ivan Demchenko; United Russia
- Federal subject: Krasnodar Krai
- Districts: Abinsky, Anapa, Krymsky, Slavyansky, Temryuksky
- Voters: 540,272 (2026)

The Western constituency (No.52 (Note: Novorossiysk constituency No.42 in 1993-1995, Novorossiysk constituency No.41 in 1995-2003, Krymsk constituency No.44 in 2003-2007, Slavyansk constituency No.48 in 2016–2026)) is a Russian legislative constituency in Krasnodar Krai. The constituency is based in western Krasnodar Krai, covering the Taman Peninsula, resort town Anapa and extending inland as far as Krymsk and Slavyansk-na-Kubani.

The constituency has been represented since 2016 by United Russia deputy Ivan Demchenko, five-term State Duma member and Abinsk Electric Steel Works owner.

== Boundaries ==
1993–2003 Novorossiysk constituency: Anapa, Anapsky District, Gelendzhik, Novorossiysk, Slavyansk-na-Kubani, Slavyansky District, Temryuksky District
The constituency covered western Krasnodar Krai, including the Taman Peninsula, major Black Sea port of Novorossiysk, sea resorts Anapa and Gelendzhik as well as the industrial town of Slavyansk-na-Kubani.

2003–2007 Krymsk constituency: Abinsky District, Anapa, Krymsk, Krymsky District, Slavyansk-na-Kubani, Slavyansky District, Temryuksky District
After 2003 redistricting the constituency was significantly changed, retaining only its western portion and losing Novorossiysk and Gelendzhik to Tuapse constituency. The constituency gained Krymsk, Krymsky District and Abinsky District from the former Prikubansky constituency as well as the name "Krymsk constituency".

2016–2026 Slavyansk constituency: Abinsky District, Anapa, Krymsky District, Slavyansky District, Temryuksky District
The constituency was re-created for the 2016 election under the name "Slavyansk constituency". The constituency retained all of its former territory from the 2003–2007 configuration.

2026–present: Abinsky District, Anapa, Krymsky District, Slavyansky District, Temryuksky District
The constituency retained its territory but changed its name from Slavyansk to Western constituency.

== Members elected ==
Election	Member	Party
1993	Nina Zatsepina	Independent
1995	Nina Zatsepina	Power to the People
1999	Sergey Shishkarev	Independent
2003	Ivan Kharchenko	Rodina
2007	Proportional representation - no election by constituency	
2011	Proportional representation - no election by constituency	
2016	Ivan Demchenko	United Russia
2021	Ivan Demchenko	United Russia
2026	Ivan Demchenko	United Russia

== Election results ==
=== 1993 ===
==== Declared candidates ====
- Gennady Fedchenko (Independent), marine transportation executive, Hero of Socialist Labour (1966)
- Ivan Glumov (Independent), Committee of Russia on Geology and Mineral Resources official
- Valentin Kisterev (APR), wine sovkhoz director
- Germogen Korolyov (Independent), Mayor of Anapa (1992–present)
- Ivan Melnikov (CPRF), dormitory housemaster
- Nina Zatsepina (Independent), career centre director

==== Results ====
Summary of the 12 December 1993 Russian legislative election in the Novorossiysk constituency
Candidate	Party	Votes	%
Nina Zatsepina	Independent	43,668	17.20%
Gennady Fedchenko	Independent	–	–
Ivan Glumov	Independent	–	–
Valentin Kisterev	Agrarian Party	–	–
Germogen Korolyov	Independent	–	–
Ivan Melnikov	Communist Party	–	–
Total		253,914	100%

=== 1995 ===
==== Declared candidates ====
- Vladimir Alekseyenko (Yabloko), director of the Novorossiysk Scientific Institute of Biospheric Geochemistry (1989–present)
- Ivan Garmash (Independent), journalist
- Ivan Glumov (NDR), Committee of Russia on Geology and Mineral Resources official, 1993 candidate for this seat
- Mikhail Kovalyuk (Common Cause), businessman
- Viktor Krokhmal (Independent), Member of Legislative Assembly of Krasnodar Krai (1994–present), agricultural executive
- Valentin Kuzmenko (APR), agriculture businessman
- Zoya Lagutina (BSG), marine port director
- Aleksandr Makarenko (Independent), Gelendzhik city hospital chief doctor
- Eduard Manvilov (Independent), businessman
- Mikhail Pavlov (Independent), head of the Gelendzhik militsiya passport and visa service
- Vasily Petridis (My Fatherland), Gelendzhik house of culture director
- Vladimir Popov (LDPR), party coordinator in Novorossiysk
- Vitaly Taranets (Independent), marine transportation executive
- Anatoly Tiron (VOPDT), union leader
- Nina Zatsepina (V–N!), incumbent Member of State Duma (1994–present)
- Olga Zhukova (Kedr), Deputy Head of Temryuksky District

==== Results ====
Summary of the 17 December 1995 Russian legislative election in the Novorossiysk constituency
Candidate	Party	Votes	%
Nina Zatsepina (incumbent)	Power to the People!	60,605	19.56%
Viktor Krokhmal	Independent	48,459	15.64%
Vitaly Taranets	Independent	39,110	12.62%
Vladimir Popov	Liberal Democratic Party	29,176	9.42%
Zoya Lagutina	Stanislav Govorukhin Bloc	22,238	7.18%
Mikhail Kovalyuk	Common Cause	15,273	4.93%
Vladimir Alekseyenko	Yabloko	13,707	4.42%
Ivan Garmash	Independent	12,800	4.13%
Ivan Glumov	Our Home – Russia	11,393	3.68%
Valentin Kuzmenko	Agrarian Party	10,587	3.42%
Olga Zhukova	Kedr	7,270	2.35%
Aleksandr Makarenko	Independent	4,374	1.41%
Anatoly Tiron	Political Movement of Transport Workers	2,834	0.91%
Eduard Manvilov	Independent	2,766	0.89%
Vasily Petridis	My Fatherland	2,658	0.86%
Mikhail Pavlov	Independent	1,471	0.47%
against all		19,278	6.22%
Total		309,808	100%

=== 1999 ===
==== Declared candidates ====
- Lidia Kichanova (Yabloko), Chairwoman of the Gelendzhik City Council of People's Deputies
- Georgy Parublev (Independent), nonprofit advisor
- Vladimir Savchenko (LDPR), lawyer
- Sergey Shishkarev (Independent), logistics businessman, founder and owner of Delo Group
- Viktor Shumilov (For Civil Dignity), sports executive, retired football player
- Vasily Teterin (Unity), former Presidential Envoy to Krasnodar Krai (1993–1996), former People's Deputy of Russia (1990–1993)
- Georgy Titarenko (Independent), commander of the Federal Border Service Special Training Marine Centre (1997–present), Russian Navy vice admiral
- Vasily Zakharov (RSP), former Member of Legislative Assembly of Krasnodar Krai (1994–1998)

==== Withdrawn candidates ====
- Yegor Borisov (Independent)
- Oleg Loginov (KRO-Boldyrev)
- Nina Zatsepina (Independent), incumbent Member of State Duma (1994–present) (disqualified for campaign rules violation)

==== Failed to qualify ====
- Zoya Bagrova (Independent), Member of Legislative Assembly of Krasnodar Krai (1998–present)
- Valentina Kuznetsova (Independent)
- Pavel Tukabayev (DN), director of the Modern University for the Humanities, Novorossiysk branch (1996–present)

==== Did not file ====
- Yury Andriyevsky (Independent), Soviet–Afghan War veteran
- Vladimir Filyursky (Independent)
- Vyacheslav Kupayev (Independent)
- Viktor Zelinsky (Independent)

==== Results ====
Summary of the 19 December 1999 Russian legislative election in the Novorossiysk constituency
Candidate	Party	Votes	%
Sergey Shishkarev	Independent	114,905	36.77%
Georgy Titarenko	Independent	31,799	10.18%
Vasily Teterin	Unity	31,368	10.04%
Lidia Kichanova	Yabloko	27,370	8.76%
Vasily Zakharov	Russian Socialist Party	15,188	4.86%
Vladimir Savchenko	Liberal Democratic Party	11,320	3.62%
Georgy Parublev	Independent	10,667	3.41%
Viktor Shumilov	For Civil Dignity	2,547	0.82%
against all		55,329	17.70%
Total		312,515	100%

=== 2003 ===
==== Declared candidates ====
- Dmitry Amichba (Independent), printing house director
- Galina Denisenko (ORP Rus'), nonprofit president
- Ivan Kharchenko (Rodina), Member of Legislative Assembly of Krasnodar Krai (1998–present)
- Vladimir Merkachev (CPRF), former Member of Legislative Assembly of Krasnodar Krai (1998–2002)
- Andrey Rakulenko (Yabloko), journalist
- Anatoly Shaplov (Independent), medical guesthouse director
- Margarita Zemtsova (LDPR), accountant

==== Failed to qualify ====
- Vladimir Bezglasny (ZRS), businessman
- Andrey Fokin (NPS RF), tax inspector
- Natalya Malakhatkina (Independent), former Member of State Duma (1994–1995)
- Andrey Prorubshchikov (PME), oil transportation specialist
- Sergey Skorobogaty (KPE), lawyer
- Andrey Tkachev (Independent), justice of the peace

==== Declined ====
- Sergey Shishkarev (Rodina), incumbent Member of State Duma (2000–present) (redistricted to Tuapse constituency)

==== Results ====
Summary of the 7 December 2003 Russian legislative election in the Krymsk constituency
Candidate	Party	Votes	%
Ivan Kharchenko	Rodina	95,206	40.07%
Anatoly Shaplov	Independent	32,329	13.61%
Vladimir Merkachev	Communist Party	31,009	13.05%
Margarita Zemtsova	Liberal Democratic Party	14,279	6.01%
Andrey Rakulenko	Yabloko	10,884	4.58%
Galina Denisenko	United Russian Party Rus'	10,686	4.50%
Dmitry Amichba	Independent	2,377	1.00%
against all		36,307	15.28%
Total		237,743	100%

=== 2016 ===
==== Declared candidates ====
- Anna Bobreshova (LDPR), store manager
- Ivan Demchenko (United Russia), Member of State Duma (2007–present)
- Yury Izmaylov (Patriots of Russia), businessman
- Mikhail Kachula (The Greens), transportation businessman
- Sergey Ketov (CPCR), security guard
- Dmitry Kolomiyets (CPRF), Member of Krasnodar City Duma (2015–present), former Member of State Duma (2015)
- Oleg Lugin (Party of Growth), Member of Krymsk Council (2014–present), property management businessman
- Nikolay Manyak (Rodina), Judge of the Krasnodar Krai Court (1981–present)
- Vitaly Prytkov (A Just Russia), Member of Slavyansk-na-Kubani Council (2014–present), gas distribution executive
- Aleksey Yegorov (Yabloko), construction businessman

==== Failed to qualify ====
- Yelena Khristova (Independent), Anapa Administration staffer

==== Results ====
Summary of the 18 September 2016 Russian legislative election in the Slavyansk constituency
Candidate	Party	Votes	%
Ivan Demchenko	United Russia	147,970	63.60%
Anna Bobreshova	Liberal Democratic Party	20,141	8.66%
Dmitry Kolomiyets	Communist Party	19,188	8.25%
Vitaly Prytkov	A Just Russia	18,342	7.88%
Sergey Ketov	Communists of Russia	6,654	2.86%
Aleksey Yegorov	Yabloko	4,810	2.07%
Nikolay Manyak	Rodina	2,772	1.19%
Yury Izmaylov	Patriots of Russia	2,648	1.14%
Oleg Lugin	Party of Growth	2,566	1.10%
Mikhail Kachula	The Greens	3,543	0.75%
Total		232,663	100%

=== 2021 ===
==== Declared candidates ====
- Ruslan Ababko (GP), chamber of commerce staffer, son of former People's Deputy of Russia Anatoly Ababko
- Irina Antishko (SR–ZP), Member of Slavyansk-na-Kubani Council (2019–present), attorney
- Vasily Baykovsky (The Greens), businessman, inventor
- Nikolay Bukin (RPPSS), pensioner
- Ivan Demchenko (United Russia), incumbent Member of State Duma (2007–present)
- Nikita Izyumov (New People), conservative political activist
- Dmitry Kolomiyets (CPRF), Member of Krasnodar City Duma (2015–present), former Member of State Duma (2015), 2016 candidate for this seat
- Aleksandr Kuzmenko (Yabloko), self-employed
- Valery Yatsenko (Party of Growth), former Deputy Head of Slavyansky District
- Valeria Yeryutina (LDPR), Member of Sochi City Assembly (2020–present), oil executive

==== Results ====
Summary of the 17-19 September 2021 Russian legislative election in the Slavyansk constituency
Candidate	Party	Votes	%
Ivan Demchenko (incumbent)	United Russia	276,279	72.29%
Dmitry Kolomiyets	Communist Party	45,255	11.84%
Irina Antishko	A Just Russia — For Truth	12,906	3.38%
Nikolay Bukin	Party of Pensioners	10,950	2.87%
Nikita Izyumov	New People	8,948	2.34%
Valeria Yeryutina	Liberal Democratic Party	8,524	2.23%
Ruslan Ababko	Civic Platform	4,440	1.16%
Vasily Baykovsky	The Greens	3,571	0.93%
Aleksandr Kuzmenko	Yabloko	2,964	0.78%
Valery Yatsenko	Party of Growth	2,756	0.72%
Total		382,196	100%

=== 2026 ===
==== Declared candidates ====
- Ivan Demchenko (United Russia), incumbent Member of State Duma (2007–present)
- Aleksey Frolov (LDPR), sailing instructor
- Igor Ignatov (CPRF), IT engineer
- Nikita Lyapunov (New People), Member of Slavyansk-na-Kubani Council (2024–present), municipal sports school deputy director
- Svetlana Volkova (A Just Russia), Member of Slavyansky District Council (2020–present), attorney

==== Results ====
Summary of the 18-20 September 2026 Russian legislative election in the Western constituency
Candidate	Party	Votes	%
Ivan Demchenko (incumbent)	United Russia	354,399	86.71%
Igor Ignatov	Communist Party	24,867	6.08%
Svetlana Volkova	A Just Russia	9,787	2.39%
Aleksey Frolov	Liberal Democratic Party	9,342	2.29%
Nikita Lyapunov	New People	8,212	2.01%
Total		408,698	100%
