= Abinsky =

Abinsky (masculine), Abinskaya (feminine), or Abinskoye may refer to:

- Abinsky District, a district of Krasnodar Krai, Russia
- Abinskoye Urban Settlement, a municipal formation which the Town of Abinsk in Abinsky District of Krasnodar Krai, Russia is incorporated as
- Abinsky, name of the town of Abinsk in Krasnodar Krai, Russia before 1963
