= Mykhailo Teliha =

Ukrainian bandurist (1900–1942)

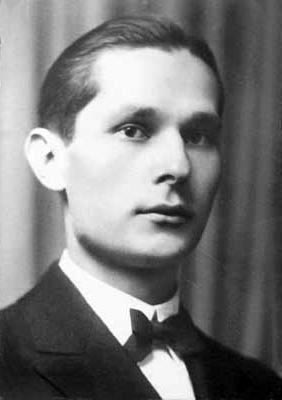
Teliha in c. 1923

Mykhailo Pavlovych Teliha (Ukrainian: Михайло Павлович Теліга; 21 November [O.S. 8 November] 1900 – 22 February 1942) was an active Ukrainian community leader and distinguished musician.

== Biography ==
He was born in the Stanitsa Akhtyrsky in the Kuban. It is here that he first became interested in playing the bandura in 1913. He trained initially as a forester and engineer and later he completed medical studies to become a doctor.

In 1918, he moved to Kyiv to aid in the establishment of the newly independent Ukraine. There he became a member of the Kobzar Choir under the direction of Vasyl Yemetz.

He was an active participant in the struggle for Ukrainian liberation where he served as a field surgeon. He was also part of the personal staff of Symon Petlura.

In 1921, he was interned in a camp in Kalisz, Poland where he organized an ethnographic ensemble and taught bandura. When it became known that negotiations had been initiated for the repatriation of those that were interned to Soviet Ukraine, he moved to Prague.

In Czechoslovakia, he lived in Prague and Poděbrady from 1923 to 1929. There he completed his studies in Medicine at the Podebrady Academy. Here he met and married the future Ukrainian poet Olena Teliha and continued his involvement with the bandura being active in the formation of a bandura school and a second Bandurist Capella in Prague.

In 1926, he was the editor of a collection of pieces for the bandura published in Prague under the auspices of the "Kobzar" society. The book contained 12 pieces of his pieces printed on 24 pages. It was the first collection of bandura music ever published.

In 1929, he and his wife moved to Poland, where he lived in Warsaw until 1939. He performed as a professional musician throughout western Ukraine during this time and recorded 6 works on 3 records for a Polish record company – "Syrena Electro". In 1939 he moved to Kraków.

His repertoire on the records included:

1. Zaporozhian march
2. Hej vydno selo
3. Oj lita orel
4. Oj ne khody Hrytsiu
5. Vyklyk
6. Vstaye khmara
7. Oj na hori vohon' horyt'

In 1941, during the German occupation of Ukraine he returned with his wife to Kyiv to participate in the rebuilding of Ukrainian culture and a Ukrainian presence in the capital.

Teliha was arrested together with his wife on 9 February 1942 by the Gestapo. He was not involved in the publication of anti-German materials in the newspaper Ukrayinske Slovo and was offered his release. He chose not to leave his wife's side and was shot a few days later on 21 (23) February 1942 in Babyn Yar, Kyiv.

== Sources ==
- Entsyklopedia Ukrainoznavstvo- volume 8
- Ukr. Slovo - Mykhailo Teliha - Bandura #51-52,1995
- nn - Mykhilo Teliha - Kubans'kyj Kozak banduryst - Bandura #57-58, 1996
