= Ivan Demchenko =

Russian politician (born 1960)

- Иван Демченко
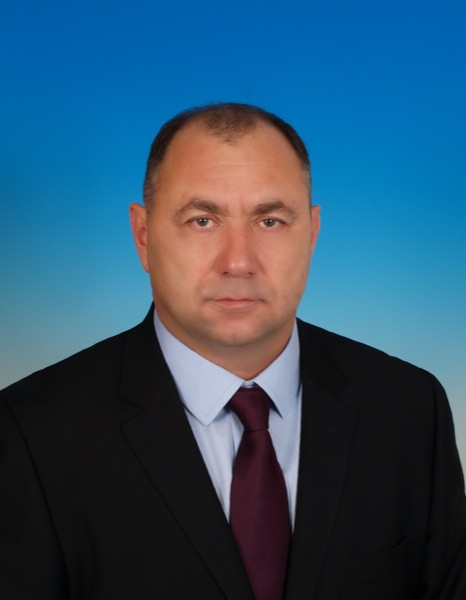

Member of the State Duma for Krasnodar Krai
- Incumbent
- Assumed office 5 October 2016
- Preceded by: constituency re-established
- Constituency: Slavyansk (No. 48)

Member of the State Duma (Party List Seat)
- In office 24 December 2007 – 5 October 2016

Personal details
- Born: 27 September 1960 (age 66) stanitsa Arkhonskaya, Prigorodny District, North Ossetian ASSR, USSR
- Party: United Russia
- Education: National University of Life and Environmental Sciences of Ukraine

Ivan Ivanovich Demchenko (Russian: Иван Иванович Демченко; born 27 September 1960, stanitsa Arkhonskaya, Prigorodny District, North Ossetia–Alania) is a Russian political figure and a deputy of the 5th, 6th, 7th, and 8th State Dumas.

Demchenko started his political career in 2002 when he was elected as a deputy of the Legislative Assembly of Krasnodar Krai from the Abinsky District. In 2006–2007, he headed the Abinsk Electric Steel Works. In 2007, he was elected deputy of the 5th State Duma from the Krasnodar krai constituency. In 2011, 2016 and 2021, he was re-elected as a deputy of the 6th, 7th State Duma and 8th State Dumas respectively.

Ivan Demchenko is awarded the medal of the "Order for Merit to the Fatherland", II degree (2013). He has the gratitude of the Government of the Russian Federation (2019). He has medals "For outstanding contribution to the development of Kuban" of III and I degrees (2008; 2010), "Hero of Labor of Kuban" (2014), "For the return of Crimea" (2014).

== Legislative Activity ==
From 2007 to 2019, during his tenure as a deputy of the State Duma of the V, VI, and VII convocations, he co-authored 19 legislative initiatives and amendments to draft federal laws.

== Awards ==
- Medal of the Order “For Merit to the Fatherland”, 2nd Class (November 15, 2013) — for active legislative activity, contributions to strengthening the rule of law, protecting the rights and interests of citizens, and many years of conscientious work.
- Commendation of the Government of the Russian Federation (December 16, 2019) — for a major contribution to the development of Russian parliamentarism and active legislative activity.

== Sanctions ==
He was sanctioned by the UK government in 2022 in relation to the Russo-Ukrainian War.

On March 24, 2022, in the context of Russia's invasion of Ukraine, he was included in the U.S. sanctions list for “complicity in Putin’s war” and for “supporting the Kremlin’s efforts in the invasion of Ukraine.” The U.S. Department of State stated that State Duma deputies use their authority to persecute dissenters and political opponents, violate freedom of information, and restrict human rights and fundamental freedoms of Russian citizens.

On similar grounds, since March 11, 2022, he has been under sanctions by the United Kingdom.[20] Since February 25, 2022, he has been under sanctions by Switzerland. Since February 26, 2022, he has been under sanctions by Australia. Since April 12, 2022, he has been under sanctions by Japan.[20] By the decree of Ukrainian president Volodymyr Zelenskyy dated September 7, 2022, he has been under sanctions by Ukraine. Since May 3, 2022, he has been under sanctions by New Zealand.
