= Aleksandr Kosovan =

- Native name: Александр Косован
- Born: 26 October 1941 (age 84); Akhtyrsky, Russian SSR
- Allegiance: Soviet Union; Russia
- Branch: Soviet Army; Russian Armed Forces
- Service years: 1966-2003
- Rank: Army general
- Education: Kuibyshev Civil Engineering Institute

Aleksandr Davydovich Kosovan (Russian: Александр Давыдович Косован; born October 26, 1941, Akhtyrskaya village, now the urban-type settlement of Akhtyrsky, Abinsky District, Krasnodar Krai, RSFSR) is a Soviet and Russian military leader who holds the rank of General of the Army.

== Biography ==
Born on October 26, 1941, in the village of Akhtyrskaya, now the urban-type settlement of Akhtyrsky, Abinsky District, Krasnodar Krai. In 1955, he graduated from a seven-year school in the city of Dzhambul, Kazakh SSR, worked on construction sites in this city and simultaneously graduated from an evening school for working youth there in 1958. In 1966, he graduated from the Novosibirsk Kuibyshev Civil Engineering Institute and the military department at it, specializing in "industrial and civil construction".

Immediately after graduating from the institute in 1966, he was called up for service in the Soviet Armed Forces. He served in the construction units of the Special Construction Directorate of the Soviet Ministry of Defense in Central Asia. For over 10 years, he served in the 32nd Directorate of the Chief of Works, which built silo complexes for intercontinental ballistic missiles of the Soviet Strategic Missile Forces, facilities of the Sary Shagan military testing ground, military camps for their service personnel and military infrastructure facilities in the closed formation of Priozersk in the area of Lake Balkhash in the Kazakh SSR. He held the positions of producer of works, head of the construction site, chief engineer, head of the construction department.

Since 1984 he served as Chief Engineer and Deputy Head of the Construction Department of the Volga Military District, then Head of the Construction Department of the Volga Military District. Since 1988 he served as Deputy Commander of the Transcaucasian Military District for Construction and Billeting of Troops. In this position, he showed dedication and played a major role in carrying out rescue operations and eliminating the consequences of the 1988 earthquake in the Armenian SSR.

Since 1992 he served as First Deputy Head of Construction and Billeting of Troops of the Ministry of Defense of Russia. Since April 1997 he served as Deputy Minister of Defense of the Russian Federation for Construction and Quartering of Troops. The military rank of General of the Army was awarded by the decree of the President of Russia Vladimir Putin dated February 22, 2002. Since March 2003 he is in the reserve. On October 26, 2006, he was dismissed.

Immediately after being discharged into the reserve, he joined the Government of Moscow. Since March 2003 he served as First Deputy Head of the Department of Urban Development Policy, Development and Reconstruction of the Government of Moscow. From June 2008 to November 2010 — Head of the Department of Urban Development of the Government of Moscow.

Since December 2010 he served as Advisor to the First Deputy Mayor of Moscow on Urban Development Policy and Construction on a voluntary basis and as president of Regionpromstroy LLC.

He is married and has a son and a daughter. His son Oleg served in the armed forces, was the head of the Federal State Unitary Enterprise "Department of Special Construction No. 10" of Spetsstroy of Russia, retired with the rank of colonel. Vice-president of Regionpromstroy LLC (which his father manages). His name is repeatedly mentioned in journalistic investigations into corruption.

== Awards ==
- Order "For Merit to the Fatherland"
- Order of Military Merit
- Order of the Red Banner of Labour
- Order "For Service to the Homeland in the Armed Forces of the USSR"
- Medal "Veteran of the Armed Forces of the USSR"
- Jubilee Medal "50 Years of the Armed Forces of the USSR"
- Jubilee Medal "60 Years of the Armed Forces of the USSR"
- Jubilee Medal "70 Years of the Armed Forces of the USSR"
- Medal "In Commemoration of the 850th Anniversary of Moscow"
- Medal "For Impeccable Service"
- Order of Friendship of South Ossetia
- Honoured Construction Worker of Russia
- Certificate of Honor of the Government of the Russian Federation
