= Kefe Eyalet =

Administrative division of the Ottoman Empire from 1568 to 1774

Eyālet-i Kefe
- Eyalet of the Ottoman Empire
- 1568–1774
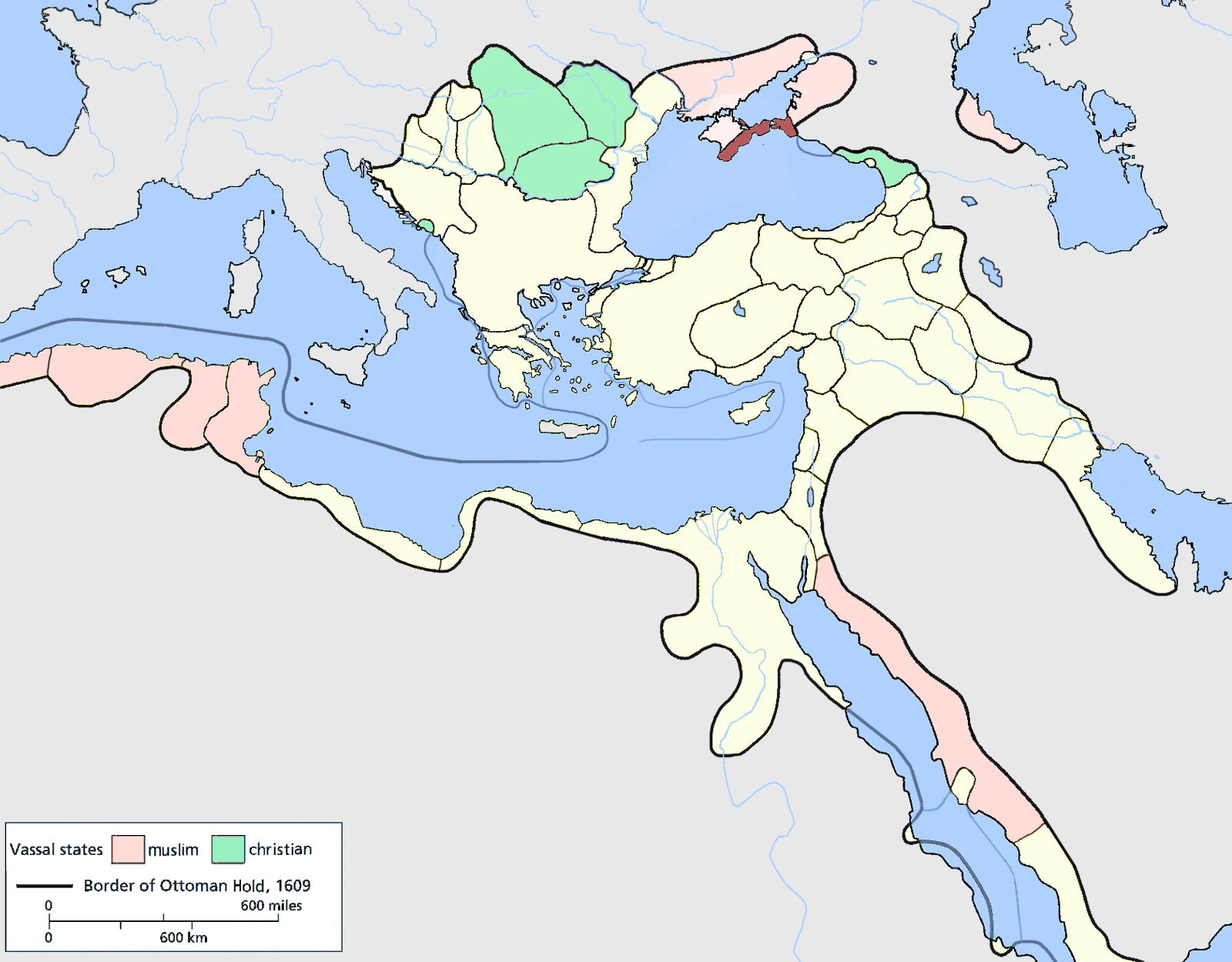
- The Kefe Eyalet in 1609
- Capital: Caffa
- Area
  - Coordinates: 45°2′N 35°22′E
- History
  - Established: 1568
  - Treaty of Küçük Kaynarca: 21 July 1774
Preceded by	Succeeded by
Rumelia Eyalet	Crimean Khanate
- Today part of: Russia; Ukraine (De jure)

The Eyalet of Kefe or Caffa (Ottoman Turkish: ایالت كفه, romanized: Eyālet-i Kefê) was an eyalet of the Ottoman Empire. The eyalet stretched across the northern coast of the Black Sea with the main sanjak (Pasha sanjak) being located in the southern coast of Crimea. The eyalet was under direct Ottoman rule, completely separate from the Khanate of Crimea. Its capital was at Kefe, the Turkish name for Caffa (modern Feodosiya in Crimea).

== History ==
The city of Caffa and its surroundings were first made an Ottoman dominion after the Turks overran the Genoese in 1475, after which a sanjak centred on Caffa was created. The Eyalet of Kefe was formed in 1568 as a beylerbeylik. By the 17th-century accounts of Evliya Çelebi, its sanjaks were "ruled by Voivodas immediately appointed by the Ottoman Sultan and not by the Khans". The eyalet was annexed to a briefly independent Khanate of Crimea as a result of the Treaty of Küçük Kaynarca of 1774. The Khanate itself would be annexed by the Russian Empire in 1783.

== Administrative divisions ==
According to Evliya Çelebi, the province of Kaffa had six sanjaks in the 17th century:

1. Sanjak of Balıklağa (Balaklava)
2. Sanjak of Kerç (Kerch)
3. Sanjak of Taman (Taman)
4. Sanjak of Çerkez Şagake (Khegayk Circassians in Anapa)
5. Sanjak of Balısıra (Bilosaray Spit)
6. Sanjak of Azak (Azov)

The administrative divisions of the beylerbeylik of Kefe between 1700 and 1730 were as follows:

1. Sanjak of Pasha (Paşa Sancağı, Feodosiya)
2. Sanjak of Akkerman (Akkerman Sancağı, Bilhorod-Dnistrovskyi)
3. Sanjak of Bender (Bender Sancağı, Bender)
4. Sanjak of Atshu Castle (Kal'a-i Açu Sancağı, Achuevo)
5. Sanjak of Zane (Zane Sancağı, Azov)
6. Sanjak of Kinburn (Kılburun Sancağı, Kinburn)

=== Kefe Sanjak ===
Initial subdivisions

1. Kaza of Mengub (Mangup)
2. Kaza of Suğdak (Sudak)
3. Kaza of Kerç (Kerch)
4. Kaza of Azak (Azov)
5. Kaza of Taman (Taman)
- Special status cities: Balıklagu (Balaklava) and İnkerman (Inkerman)

== See also ==
- History of Crimea

== Bibliography ==
- Fisher, Alan W. (1 September 2014). The Crimean Tatars. Hoover Press. p. 278. ISBN 9780817966638.
- Ágoston, Gábor; Masters, Bruce Alan (21 May 2010). Encyclopedia of the Ottoman Empire. Infobase Publishing. p. 689. ISBN 9781438110257.
