= Prague Bandurist Capella =

Czech Ukrainian musical ensemble

The Prague Bandurist Capella was a musical ensemble formed in 1924 by Ukrainians living in Czechoslovakia featuring performers on the bandura.

After the occupation of Ukraine by the Bolsheviks, many Ukrainians moved to the West. In Prague they established a cultural and intellectual centre.

Vasyl Yemetz also moved to the West, initially to Berlin and later to Prague. In Prague he established a number of bandura schools in Prague and Poděbrady in 1923–1925.

Over 100 banduras were made in Poděbrady by Romanenko and Dovzhenko. The school had over 50 students.

In time, from the better students a second Bandurist Capella was established in 1924. Among the members were Mykhailo Teliha and future Ukrainian President in exile Mykola Levytsky. The capella was made up of 15 or 16 bandurists and gave numerous concerts in Prague and its environs.

Reviews of the Capella's performances were published in music magazines in Ukraine, often quite negative regarding its repertoire. In general, the reviewers described the repertoire as too folky and village-oriented. Still, these reviews did stimulate the formation and government support of the bandurist capella movement in Ukraine.

== Repertoire ==
The Soviet Ukrainian magazine "Muzyka" #2, 1925 gave a review of the first concert of the Prague Bandurist Capella which took place 13 September 1924 and included the program:

I Kobza and the kobzars - speech by V. Yemetz

II

1. Nema v sviti pravdy - kant - Capella
2. Kynu kuzhil' na polyciu - Capella
3. Plyve sonce nad Orelliu - I. Khvorostenko
4. Zasvystally kozachen'ky - M. Zhyrkov
5. Zalizniak - M. Teliha

III

1. Oj na hori vohonq horyt' - R. Zavors'kyj
2. Oj Moroze, Morozen'ku - Capella
3. Oj shchoh to za shum uchynyvsia - Capella
4. Hopak - Capella
5. Oj, za hayem, hayem - Capella

All the orchestrations were done by V. Yemetz.

In 1926 a book of 12 pieces for the bandura was published in Prague.

== Participants ==
Members of the Capella and students of the school included:

- A. Biletskyj
- Petro Buhayiv (Mykola Burhaj)
- Nina Burtakova
- Hryhoryj Dovzhenko - bandura maker that Yemetz knew from Moscow.
- Oleksander Dutka (and daughter) - moved to Chernivtsi where he continued to make banduras.
- Vasyl' Harmiga (Farmiga?)
- Maria Hasiuk
- Il'ko Havryliuk
- Mykola Hudzij
- Rostyslav Kaplynskyj
- I. Khvorostenko
- H. Khomenko
- Yukhym Klevchutskyj - originally from Central Ukraine, later moved to Ternopil where he taught Zinoviy Shtokalko.
- Pan'ko Konoushynsky
- Stepan Koshchyk
- Petro Koshchyk
- Yevhen Koshchyk
- Kulish
- Andriy Kyst' - later moved to the US, performed with Avramenko.
- Mykola Levytsky - Later moved to France.
- Liashenko
- Lisevych - Originally from Central Ukraine. Moved to Lviv and taught bandura there.
- Ivan Lokshynsky
- K. Mohyla - a student of medicine, later director of the Prague capella after Yemetz
- Petro Nepokypnyj - Bandura maker. Later lived in Bratislava.
- Vasyl' Oblomskyj
- M. Omelchenko - taught bandura in Prague. Studied piano in Vienna.
- I. Romanenko - bandura maker in Poděbrady
- Rostyslav Pazanivskyj - moved to Canada - St Catherines.
- Maria Shostak - originally from Kuban. Later moved to Lviv and taught bandura there.
- Volodymyr Shmorhun
- Volodymyr Shul'
- K. Stetsiurenko
- Dmytro Stopkevych
- A. Syvokin'
- Serhiy Tarulia
- Zavorytskyj, Panas (Zavorskyj R. - soloist of the capella
- Zhyrkov, M. - soloist of the capella
- Vsevolod Zmiyenko

== Sources ==
Yemetz, V. - U zolote 50-richchia na sluzhbi Ukrainy - Toronto, 1961 - p. 75, 79

"Muzyka" #2, 1925

- Горлиця. Л. - Василь Ємець – кобзар віртуоз, композитор // Вісті, ч. 34, 1970.
- Ємець, В. У золоте 50 річчя на службі Україні — Голівуд, США, 1961
- Ластович-Чулівський, С. Бандура – Рукопис, Мюнхен 1965
- Лисько, З. До історії кобзарського мистецтва // Сучасність, 1977 ч. 10
- Маруняк, В. (упор) Українська Гімназія в Чехії (1925–45) – Мюнхен, 1975
- Мішалов, В. Бандура в еміграційних центрах у міжвоенний період // Karpacki collage artystyczny Biuletyn - Przemysl 2005 s.95-104
- ж. Музика #2, 1925 р.
- Самчук, У. - Живі струни - Детройт, США, 1976
- Теліга, М. – Наша пісня – Збірник українських народних дум і пісень з проводом бандури – Збірник перший – вид. “Кобзар” Прага, 1926
