= Tamansky otdel =

Coordinates: 45°15′N 38°07′E

Tamansky otdel Таманскій отдѣлъ
- Otdel
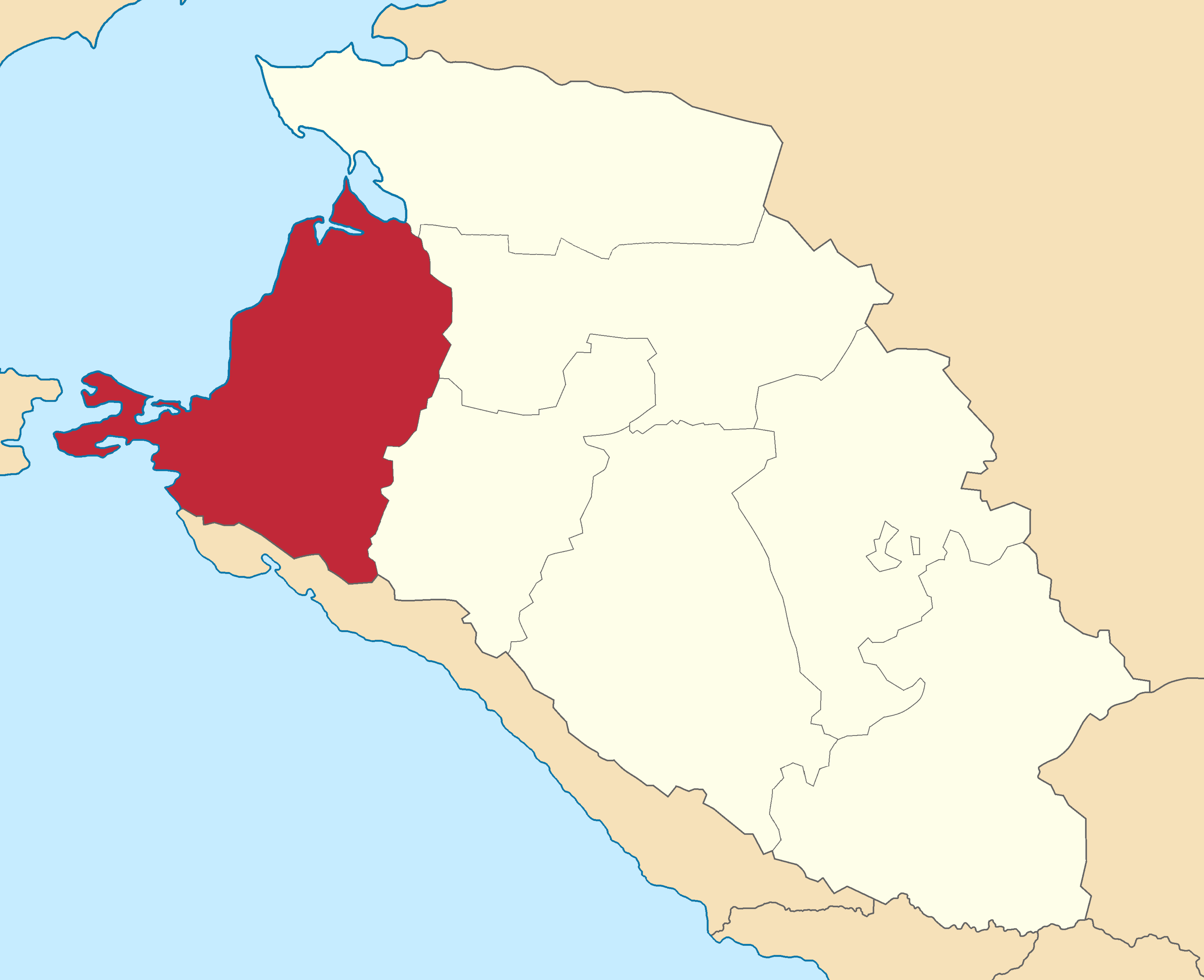
- Location in the Kuban Oblast
- Country: Russian Empire
- Viceroyalty: Caucasus
- Oblast: Kuban
- Established: 1869
- Abolished: 1924
- Capital: Slavyanskaya (present-day Slavyansk-na-Kubani)

Area
  - Total: 16,130.71 km^{2} (6,228.10 sq mi)

Population (1916)
  - Total: 518,379
  - Density: 32.1362/km^{2} (83.2323/sq mi)
  - Urban: 7.31%
  - Rural: 92.69%

The Tamansky otdel, (Note: Russian: Тама́нскій отдѣ́лъ, romanized: Tamánsky otdél; Ukrainian: Таманський відділ, romanized: Tamanskyy viddil) known before 1910 as the Temryuksky otdel, (Note: Russian: Темрю́кскій отдѣ́лъ, romanized: Temryúksky otdél; Ukrainian: Темрюцький відділ, romanized: Temryutskyy viddil) was a Cossack district (otdel) of the Kuban oblast of the Caucasus Viceroyalty of the Russian Empire. It bordered the Yeysky otdel to the north, the Black Sea to the west, the Black Sea Governorate to the south, and the Kavkazsky and Yekaterinodarsky otdels to the east. The area of the Tamansky otdel mostly corresponded to the contemporary Krasnodar Krai region of Russia. The district's administrative capital was the stanitsa of Slavyanskaya (Slavyansk-na-Kubani).

== Administrative divisions ==
The subcounties (uchastoks) of the Tamansky otdel in 1912 were as follows:

Name	1912 population
1-y uchastok (1-й участокъ)	42,868
2-y uchastok (2-й участокъ)	47,981
3-y uchastok (3-й участокъ)	86,929
4-y uchastok (4-й участокъ)	58,359

== Demographics ==
=== Russian Empire Census ===
According to the Russian Empire Census, the Tamansky otdel—then known as the Temryuksky otdel—had a population of 342,976 on 28 January [O.S. 15 January] 1897, including 174,107 men and 168,869 women. The majority of the population indicated Ukrainian to be their mother tongue, with a significant Russian speaking minority.

Linguistic composition of the Temryuksky otdel in 1897
Language	Native speakers	%
Ukrainian	257,918	75.20
Russian	58,660	17.10
Greek	13,812	4.03
Romanian	3,393	0.99
German	2,335	0.68
Armenian	2,078	0.61
Turkish	767	0.22
Belarusian	763	0.22
Czech	578	0.17
Circassian	463	0.13
Tatar (Note: Before 1918, Azerbaijanis were generally known as "Tatars". This term, employed by the Russians, referred to Turkic-speaking Muslims of the South Caucasus. After 1918, with the establishment of the Azerbaijan Democratic Republic and "especially during the Soviet era", the Tatar group identified itself as "Azerbaijani".)	447	0.13
Kyurin	403	0.12
Polish	309	0.09
Romani	295	0.09
Jewish	211	0.06
Georgian	192	0.06
Bulgarian	63	0.02
Persian	42	0.01
Mordovian	38	0.01
Kalmyk	32	0.01
Avar-Andean	30	0.01
Kazi-Kumukh	17	0.00
Bashkir	8	0.00
Lithuanian	5	0.00
Estonian	4	0.00
Kumyk	4	0.00
Ossetian	4	0.00
Abkhaz	2	0.00
Kabardian	2	0.00
Latvian	2	0.00
Karachay	1	0.00
Nogai	1	0.00
Other	97	0.03
TOTAL	342,976	100.00

=== Kavkazskiy kalendar ===
According to the 1917 publication of Kavkazskiy kalendar, the Tamansky otdel had a population of 518,379 on 14 January [O.S. 1 January] 1916, including 260,844 men and 257,535 women, 296,096 of whom were the permanent population, and 222,283 were temporary residents:

Nationality	Urban		Rural		TOTAL	
Nationality	Number	%	Number	%	Number	%
Russians	37,256	98.36	474,881	98.83	512,137	98.80
Armenians	230	0.61	2,844	0.59	3,074	0.59
Other Europeans	116	0.31	1,399	0.29	1,515	0.29
North Caucasians	37	0.10	1,362	0.28	1,399	0.27
Jews	216	0.57	16	0.00	232	0.04
Roma	9	0.02	0	0.00	9	0.00
Shia Muslims (Note: Primarily Tatars.)	8	0.02	0	0.00	8	0.00
Asiatic Christians	5	0.01	0	0.00	5	0.00
TOTAL	37,877	100.00	480,502	100.00	518,379	100.00

== Bibliography ==
- Bournoutian, George A. (2018). Armenia and Imperial Decline: The Yerevan Province, 1900–1914. Milton Park, Abingdon, Oxon: Routledge. ISBN 978-1-351-06260-2. OCLC 1037283914.
- Hovannisian, Richard G. (1971). The Republic of Armenia. Vol. 1: The First Year, 1918–1919. Berkeley: University of California Press. ISBN 978-0520019843.
- Кавказский календарь на 1913 год [Caucasian calendar for 1913] (in Russian) (68th ed.). Tiflis: Tipografiya kantselyarii Ye.I.V. na Kavkaze, kazenny dom. 1913. Archived from the original on 19 April 2022.
- Кавказский календарь на 1917 год [Caucasian calendar for 1917] (in Russian) (72nd ed.). Tiflis: Tipografiya kantselyarii Ye.I.V. na Kavkaze, kazenny dom. 1917. Archived from the original on 4 November 2021.
- Tsutsiev, Arthur (2014). Atlas of the Ethno-Political History of the Caucasus (PDF). Translated by Nora Seligman Favorov. New Haven: Yale University Press. ISBN 9780300153088. Archived (PDF) from the original on 17 June 2023.
