= Olena Teliha =

Ukrainian poet and activist (1906–1942)

- Олена Теліга
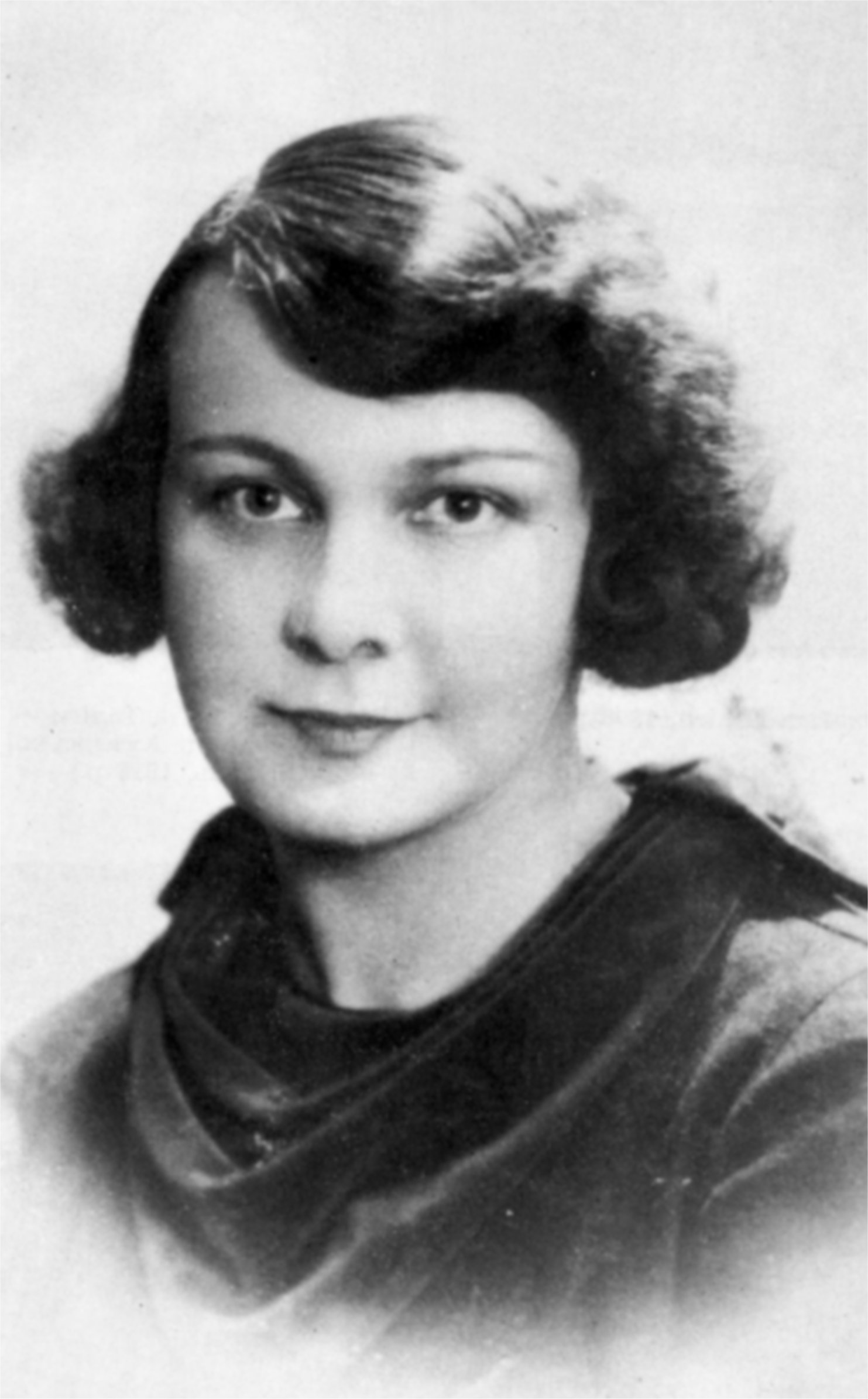
- Teliha in c. 1929
- Born: July 21, 1906; Ilyinskoye, Moscow Governorate, Russian Empire
- Died: February 21, 1942 (aged 35); Kyiv, Reichskommissariat Ukraine
- Occupations: Poet; writer

Olena Ivanivna Teliha (Ukrainian: Олена Іванівна Теліга; July 21, 1906 – February 21, 1942) was a Ukrainian poet and activist of the Organization of Ukrainian Nationalists (OUN) and later the OUN-M of Ukrainian and Belarusian ethnicity.

== Biography ==
Olena Chovgeniva was born in the village of Ilyinskoye, near Moscow in Russia where her parents spent summer vacations. There are several villages by this name in that area, and it is unknown exactly which one of them is Olena Teliha's birthplace. Her father was a civil engineer while her mother came from a family of Russian Orthodox priests. In 1918, she moved to Kyiv with her family, when her father became a minister in the new UNR government. There they lived through the years of Ukrainian War of Independence. When the Bolsheviks took over, her father moved to Czechoslovakia, and the rest of the family followed him in 1923. After living through the rise and fall of Ukrainian National Republic, Olena took an avid interest in Ukrainian language and literature. In Prague, she attended a Ukrainian teacher's college where she studied history and philology. She met a group of young Ukrainian poets in Prague and started writing poetry herself. After her marriage to Mykhaylo Teliha, she moved to Warsaw, Poland, where she lived until the start of the Second World War. In 1939, like many of the young Ukrainians with whom she associated, Olena Teliha became a member of the Organization of Ukrainian Nationalists, within which she became an activist in cultural and educational matters.

Fingers breaking – long and slender, To tear up habits like old cats, To take up weapons from your hand And strike hard where a hard strike is needed.

— O. Teliha, "Answer"

In 1941, Olena and her husband Mykhailo Teliha (whom she met and married in Czechoslovakia) moved back to Nazi-occupied Kyiv, where she expanded her work as a literal and cultural activist, heading the Ukrainian Writers' Guild and editing a weekly cultural and arts newspaper "Litavry". In their resistance efforts, Olena and Mykhailo carried out clandestine anti-German operations, formed the city government, and created the Ukrainian Red Cross.

In the fall of 1941, Teliha was on the editorial board of Ukrains'ke Slovo ("Ukrainian Word"), a collaborationist newspaper that was fiercely antisemitic and part of the Organization of Ukrainian Nationalists.

A lot of her activities were in open defiance of the Nazi authorities. She watched her closest colleagues from the newspaper "Ukrainian Word" ("Ukrayins"ke Slovo") get arrested and yet chose to ignore the dangers. She refused to flee, declaring that she would never again go into exile. In the prison cell where she stayed, her last written words were scribbled on the wall: "Here was interred and from here goes to her death Olena Teliha".

== Death ==
Teliha died in February 1942. The precise circumstances around her death are contested. It is popularly cited in post-Soviet Ukraine that Teliha and her husband were executed by the Nazis at Babyn Yar.

Historian Yuri Radchenko examined this claim and found it to be as of yet unsupported beyond its appearance in former OUN-M members' memoirs written between the 1970s–1990s, coming to the conclusion that the most probable theory surrounding her death was that she took her own life in prison following ruthless beatings and torture at the hands of Nazi police, based on the testimonies of a fellow inmate and the Mayor of Kyiv at the time as well as the memoirs of a former OUN-M member that wrote of an instance where he and his fellow Melnykites assumed that those who disappeared without a trace had been killed at Babyn Yar. Per Anders Rudling concludes that the method or location of the executions is unknown but that their bodies probably ended up at Babyn Yar, accusing efforts to memorialise the killings at the site of attempting to overshadow and forget the other 50,000–60,000 estimated to have been killed there.

== Ideology ==
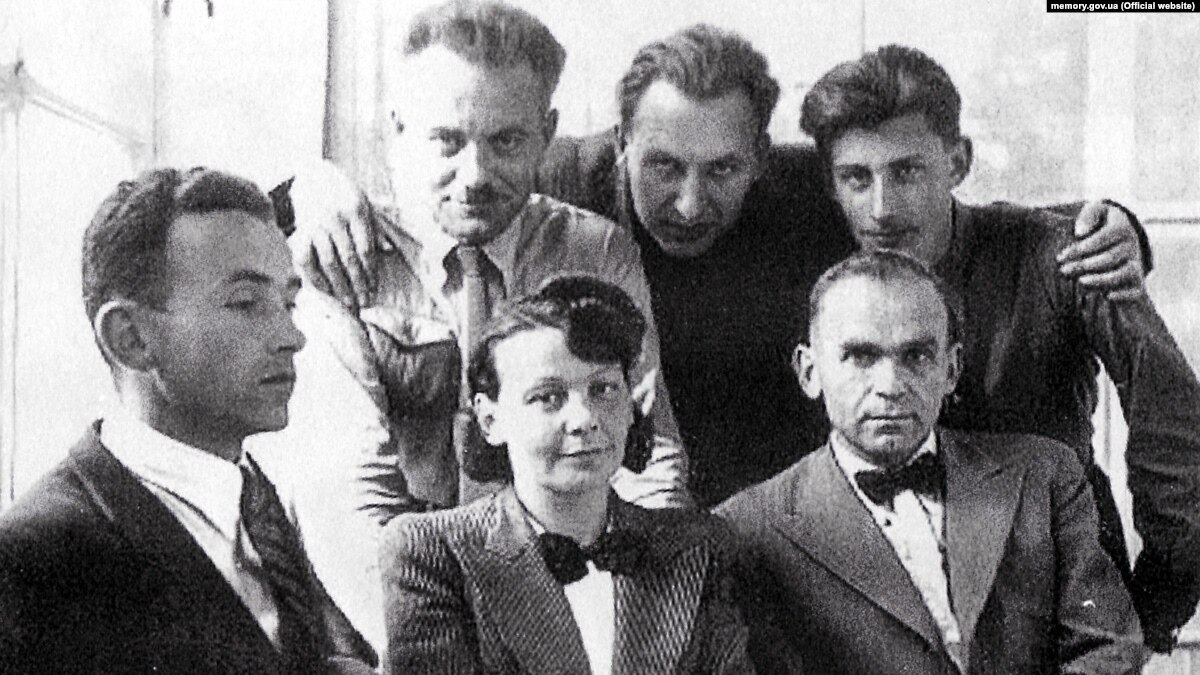
Olena Teliha together with Ulas Samchuk in Lviv as part of the 1941 OUN-M expeditionary group to Kyiv.

Myroslav Shkandrij considers Olena Teliha to be one the prominent examples of Ukrainian feminism of the XXth century. In her verses, love to nation and feminism were interlinked: "She wants to be a Woman. A woman who differs from a man and yet is his equal, a faithful ally of men in the struggle for life, and, above all, for the nation."

According to Slavistic researcher Radana Merzova, Olena Teliha's work was long misunderstood, and only contemporary post-colonial criticism has offered a coherent and accurate interpretation of her literary legacy. Through her writing, she introduced national pathos and anti-colonial resistance into women's artistic expression (an arena previously regarded as a male domain) while portraying female figures as fully feminine yet equally engaged in embodying national values and participating in anti-colonial struggle. Her work thus advances a new concept of femininity that unites traditional womanhood with intellectual, civic, and revolutionary equality alongside men. As Radana Merzova (researcher in slavistics) described: "The figures of women in the work of O. Teliha are heroines in all of their femininity (elegant, patient, sensitive, a loving woman and mother) although, in the same way as men, they manifest national values and organise the same anti-colonial revolts. Women in the treatments of Olena Teliha have truly specific features for that time."

Professor Roman Adrian Cybriwsky, in his book Ukrainian Nationalism: Politics, Ideology, and Literature, 1929–1956, states that when the newspaper Ukrains'ke slovo was shut down and reformed into Nove Ukrains'ke Slovo, which was more anti-Ukrainian and antisemitic, Olena Teliha refused to work in it.

Historians Efraim Zuroff and Per Anders Rudling report that Teliha was an enthusiastic admirer of Adolf Hitler and Benito Mussolini and was in favor of the establishment of a totalitarian government in Ukraine.

Historian Myroslav Shkandrij reports that in 1936 Teliha followed Ukrainian nationalist Dmytro Dontsov's line on support for Hitler, commenting on the Führer's assassination of Ernst Röhm during the so-called "Night of the Long Knives" of 1934: "What is strange about this? After all, even Christ had to take a whip to his 'own' race to drive his 'blood brothers' out of the temple." Speaking of Machiavelli, Mussolini, and Hitler, Teliha stated that they "were not always merciful and tender in reeducating their 'blood brothers'".

== Poetry ==
- "Only the evening flies over the city"
- Joy
- Abroad
- Life
- To men
- I. Someone else's spring
- II. Sleepy day
- III. Blazing day
- Everlasting
- Turn
- Tango
- Cossack
- Travel
- "No need for words. Let there be only business..."
- Summer
- Loyalty
- "The night was turbulent and dim..."
- "My soul and a dark drink..."
- "Not love, not a whim and not an adventure..."
- To a man
- "Sharp eyes open in the dark..."
- "Today every step would like to be a waltz..."
- A unique holiday
- On the fifth floor
- "They wave their hand! Pour the wine..."
- Reply
- "I will not forgive the hand that hit me..."
- Immortal
- Fifteenth autumn
- Evening song
- Black square
- Letter
- "Everything - but not this! Not these peaceful days..."
- On the eve [Two sonnets]
- A sunny memory
- 1933—1939
- Convicted

== Remembrance ==
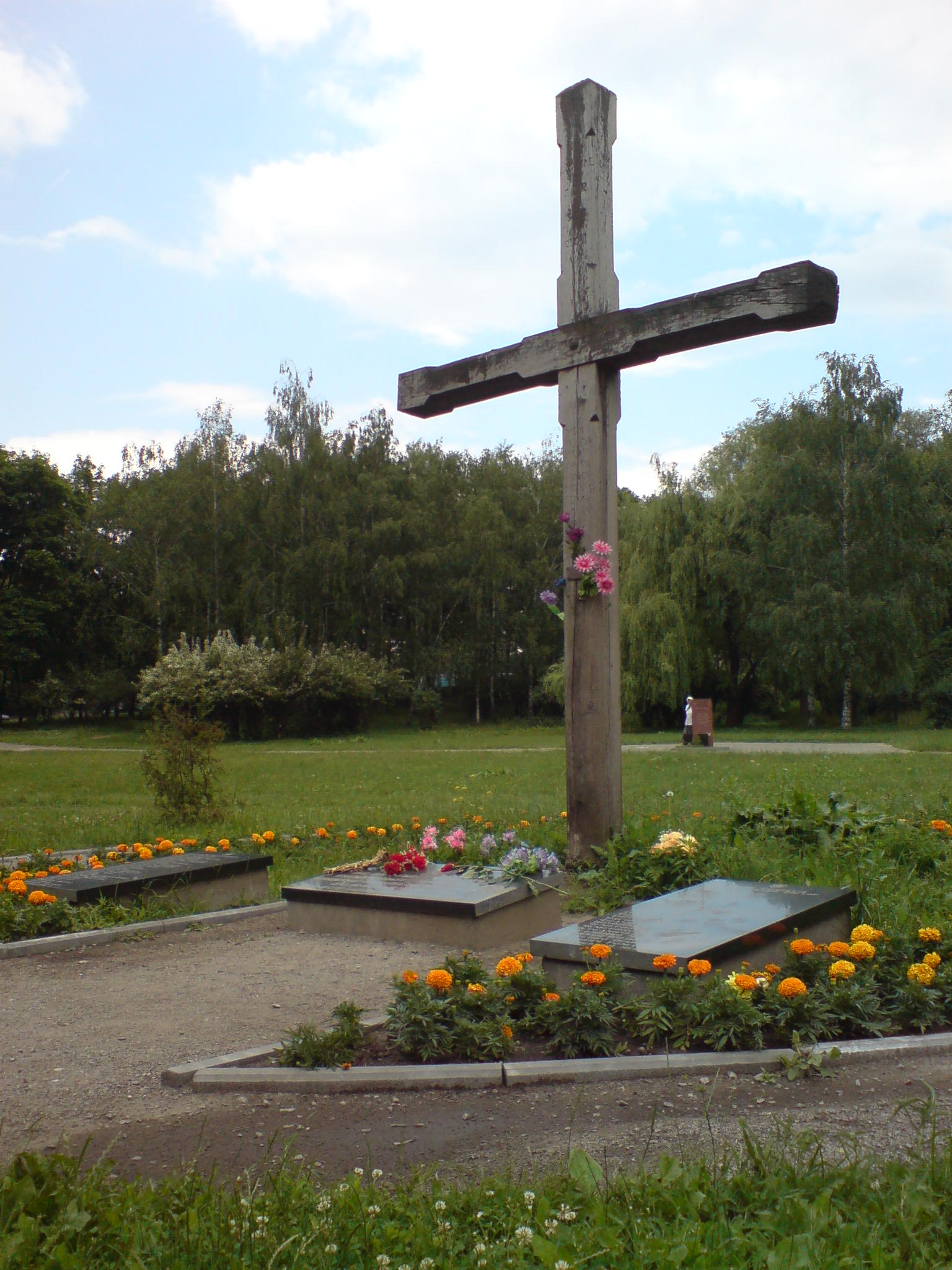
Wooden cross in Babi Yar in memory of Olena Teliha and other Ukrainian nationalists executed there in 1942

On July 19, 2007 the National bank of Ukraine issued a commemorative coin dedicated to Olena Teliha.

On 25 February 2017 a monument to Teliha was unveiled at Babi Yar. The monument was consecrated by head of the Ukrainian Orthodox Church of the Kyivan Patriarchate Patriarch Filaret. The Ukrainian authorities erected the monument at the site where 33,000 Kiev Jews were massacred in 1941, a year before Teliha was killed, an event that will be remembered as the “Babi Yar massacre”. Ukrainian Foreign Minister Borys Zakharchuk stated that Teliha and the editors of Ukrainian World were killed because they had helped save some Jews. Historian Per Anders Rudling points out, however, that the same newspaper published strongly anti-Semitic material during the September-October 1941 pogrom in Kiev. Rudling also stated that there is no evidence that Teliha was shot in Babi Yar and that the story emerged only in the 1970s.

== See also ==
- List of Ukrainians
- Culture of Ukraine
- Ukrainian literature
