= Slavyansk-na-Kubani Airfield =

Coordinates: 45°12′28″N 38°05′13″E

- IATA: none; ICAO: none

Summary
- Airport type: Сivilian
- Location: Slavyansk-na-Kubani, Russia
- Elevation AMSL: 8 ft / 7 m
- Interactive map of Slavyansk-na-Kubani Airfield

Runways
Direction	Length		Surface
Direction	ft	m	Surface
09/27		685	Asfalt

Slavyansk-na-Kubani is an aerodrome in Slavyansk-na-Kubani Krasnodar Krai Russia, located on the southern outskirts of the city, 5 km from the center. It is used for aerial work. The aerodrome was relocated and resized several times; previously it was capable of receiving aircraft: An-12, An-24, An-26, An-72, Il-18, Il-76, Tupolev Tu-134, Tu-154, Yak-42 and more light, as well as helicopters of all types.
