= Vasyl Yemetz =

Ukrainian bandurist (1890–1982)

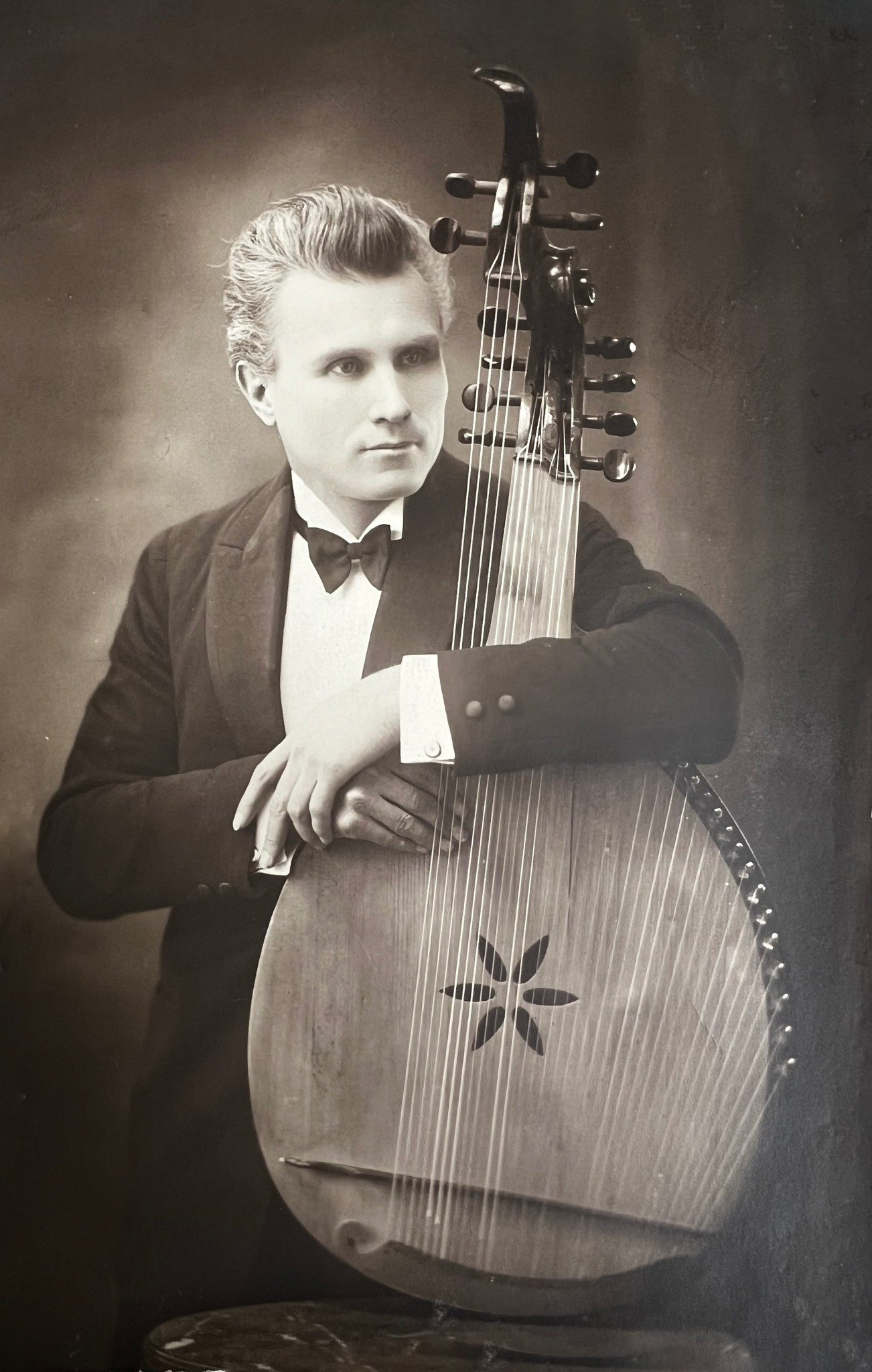
Vasyl Kostovych Yemetz

Vasyl Kostovych Yemetz (Ukrainian: Василь Костьович Ємець; 15 December or 27 December 1891 – 6 January 1982) (2 August 1890 – 4 January 1982) (also went by Wassyl, Vassyl) was a Ukrainian bandurist. He was founder and initial director of the Kobzar Choir in 1918 - the direct protégé of the Kyiv Bandurist Capella and the Ukrainian Bandurist Chorus.

== Biography ==
Yemetz was born in the village of Sharivka, Ukraine. He was born to a Cossack family. He was the son of Kost' and Yevdokia (Kurakhovych).

His father was interested in Ukrainian ethnography and his family was one of the first to have a phonograph (1899) with which they recorded and collected folk songs. It is from one of the local kobzari, Ivan Kucherenko, that Yemetz became drawn to the culture of the kobzari and learned to play the bandura in 1908.

His first performance as a bandurist took place in 1911, and it became very controversial because of the text of the song that he chose to sing.

He studied at Kharkiv University (1911–1913) but was forced to transfer in 1914 to Moscow University because of his political activities. In Moscow, he became the first bandurist to perform solo in the Bolshoi Theatre in 1916. After this performance, he was hailed as a virtuoso in the Russian press.

In the summer of 1913, he was invited by Mykola Bohuslavsky to Yekaterinodar in the Kuban to teach bandura. He was instrumental in establishing the modern bandura playing tradition amongst the Kuban Cossacks.

After completing his studies at Moscow University, he received a teaching position in 1917 in Sosnytsia, Chernihiv Oblast in Ukraine. There, he was chosen as a delegate at the All-Ukr. National Congress held in Kyiv in 1917.

In 1918, he moved to Kyiv where he organized the first professional Bandurist Capella known as the Kobzar Choir. The first concert of the group took place in the Bergone Theatre in Kyiv on November 3, 1918. The ensemble's last concert was a Taras Shevchenko concert in March 1919.

From 1918 to 1920, he served with the Ukrainian National Army.

== Emigration in Europe ==
In 1921, he moved to Berlin where he continued his studies at the Berlin Conservatory. In Berlin, he published a number of articles about the Kobzari, which included materials about his interactions with them. This led to the publication of his first book on the Kobzari.

In 1923, he moved to Prague, which had become a major Ukrainian emigre centre. Here, he set up a school for the teaching of the bandura in Prague and Poděbrady in 1923 which had over 60 students. A workshop for the manufacturing of instruments was established which made over 100 instruments. In 1926, the first collection of works for the bandura was published in Prague.

On the basis of the many bandura students, Yemetz established a second Bandurist Capella in Prague and also a number of smaller bandura ensembles in the Ukrainian Gymnasium, the Ukrainian Free University, the Drahomanov Pedagogical Institute in Prague and the Forestry Institute in Podebrady.

Yemetz's highly publicized activities stimulated the re-establishment of the Kiev Bandurist Capella, the formation of the Poltava Bandurist Capella and the establishment of formal bandura classes in Kharkiv in 1926. The students of the Czech bandura schools established a culture of bandura playing in Western Ukraine and Poland when many students returned there after completing their studies.

Yemetz's brother-in-law Hryhory Kopan wrote to him inviting him back to Kiev to re-establish the Kiev Bandurist Capella in the early 1920s, however he declined to return.

In 1926, Yemetz continued touring Eastern Europe with solo recitals. In 1927, he first performed in France and Belgium. In early 1929 he toured Carpathian regions in Czechoslovakia and Romania, before returning to France and setting off for North America.

== North America ==
In 1929, Yemetz toured North America for the first time to great success recording his first record there in 1932.

In 1934, Yemetz returned to France. He returned to North America in 1937 touring all the major cities of Canada and the United States. He married and in 1941 became an American citizen.

Yemetz settled in Hollywood and started work in 1945 on constructing a chromatic concert bandura. He developed a new repertoire for the instrument and toured the United States in 1946 with classical transcriptions played on the new chromatic concert bandura. This is the first time that works such as Beethoven's "Moonlight sonata" and Tchaikovsky's "Arabian dance" were performed on the bandura.

In 1952, he recorded an LP record, however it was not commercially released.

After 1956, he retired from performing and spent most of his time collecting materials and writing memoirs many of which remain unpublished. Much of his personal archives including music, photographs and concert programs were stored in a trunk he had left with a musicologist in Winnipeg. These were destroyed during the Great Winnipeg Flood.

He died in Hollywood on 4 January 1982.

== Publications ==
He published over 40 articles on various aspects of the bandura.

== Sources ==
- Kudrytsky, A. V. - Mystetsvo Ukrainy - Biohrafichnyj dovidnyk - Kyiv 1997
- Ukrainians in North America, USA
- Кіндзерявий-Пастухів, С. - Думки вголос – Кобзарський листок Рік 5 ч. 39, Січень 1978, (Про записи з грою В. Ємця)
- Литвин, М. – Струни золотії – “Веселка”, К.:1994 (117с.)
- Самчук, У. - Живі струни - Детройт, США, 1976 (468с.)
