= Slavyansk-on-Kuban =

Town in Krasnodar Krai, Russia

Slavyansk-on-Kuban Славянск-на-Кубани
- Town
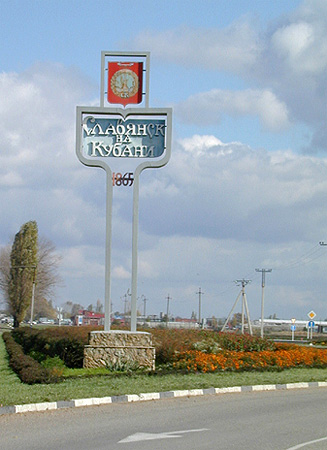
- Welcome sign at one of the entrances to the town

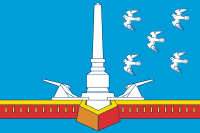
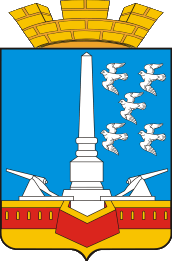
- Flag Coat of arms
- Interactive map of Slavyansk-on-Kuban
- Location of Slavyansk-on-Kuban Slavyansk-on-Kuban (Krasnodar Krai)
- Coordinates: 45°15′N 38°07′E
- Country: Russia
- Federal subject: Krasnodar Krai
- Founded: 1865
- Town status since: 1958
- Elevation: 7 m (23 ft)

Population (2010 Census)
  - Total: 63,842
  - Estimate (2025): 60,780 (−4.8%)
  - Rank: 247th in 2010

Administrative status
  - Subordinated to: Town of Slavyansk-on-Kuban
  - Capital of: Town of Slavyansk-on-Kuban, Slavyansky District

Municipal status
  - Municipal district: Slavyansky Municipal District
  - Urban settlement: Slavyanskoye Urban Settlement
  - Capital of: Slavyansky Municipal District, Slavyanskoye Urban Settlement
- Time zone: UTC+3 (MSK)
- Postal code: 353560
- OKTMO ID: 03645101001
- Website: cityslav.ru

Slavyansk-on-Kuban (Russian: Славянск-на-Кубани, romanized: Slavyansk-na-Kubani) is a town in Krasnodar Krai, Russia, located in the Kuban River delta. Population: 63,842 (2010 census); 64,136 (2002 census); 57,790 (1989 Soviet census); 56,000 (1975).

== History ==
Slavyansk originated in the Middle Ages as Copa or Coparia, a Genoese trade outpost controlled by the Ghisolfi family and was one of the most important Genoese colonies in the Black Sea area. After the fall of the Genoese power in the Pontic region, the site was abandoned until 1747 when the Crimean Khanate erected a small fort, known in Russian sources as Kopyl.

After the conquest of the Taman Peninsula by the Russian Empire, the Tatar fort gave way to the Cossack stanitsa of Kopylskaya. In 1865, it was renamed after the Slavyansky regiment that had been quartered there under Catherine the Great. In 1958, it was incorporated as the town of Slavyansk-na-Kubani (so called in order to distinguish it from the eponymous city in Ukraine).. The history of Slavyansk dates backs to the end of the 18th century. This town was a fortress founded by General Suvorov to defend the southern borders of Russia. In 1865 the fortress became a Cossack stanitsa. During World War II this town was occupied by the Germans in 1942-3 and it was re-occupied by The Red Army in 1943. The town features monuments to those who were lost in the war. The city was the administrative center of the Tamansky Otdel of the Kuban Oblast.

According to the 1926 Soviet Census, the town accounted for over 69% of Ukrainians.

== Toponymy ==
The town's name is derived from the name of the village Slavyanskaya in 1958. Slavyansk has already existed since the USSR in the Donetsk region so a city name added clarification "-on-Kuban". The name was given to the village by name strengthen "Slavic feldshanets" Slavic Hussars, which had been under the command of Alexander Suvorov on the right bank of the Kuban.

Different sources give different emphasis to the name “Slavyansk” - on the first and the second syllable, however, the locals accepted the name Slavyansk on the first syllable, although it contradicts the rules of the Russian language.

== Geography ==
The city is located on the banks of the Protoka river that flows to the Kuban Delta, 68 km from Krasnodar. Floor space is 20 square kilometers, along the administrative border - 39,5 km ².

There is a railway station on Protoka Timashyovsk line - Crimea.

== Economy ==
- Production of petroleum products
- Food industry: wine, canning, butter and cheese factories, rice and grain plants, poultry farm
- Light industry: garment factory
- Construction materials productions

=== Agriculture ===
Slavyansky district is one of the largest agricultural areas of Kuban with a predominance of land cultivation. Grain crops occupy two-thirds of the planted area. The leading direction is the production of rice. More than 30% of the total crop of Kuban rice is harvested in the Slavyansky district. In the region and beyond are widely known products of the agricultural company named "Garden-giant". It is the largest garden in Europe. According to the gross harvest of fruits and berries (annual production is more than 30 thousand tons), the company ranks first in the region (26% of the total volume). Also animal husbandry and fisheries are developed.

== Administrative and municipal status ==
Within the framework of administrative divisions, Slavyansk-na-Kubani serves as the administrative center of Slavyansky District, even though it is not a part of it. As an administrative division, it is incorporated separately as the Town of Slavyansk-na-Kubani—an administrative unit with the status equal to that of the districts. As a municipal division, the Town of Slavyansk-na-Kubani is incorporated within Slavyansky Municipal District as Slavyanskoye Urban Settlement.

== Attraction ==
- Slavonic Museum of Local History
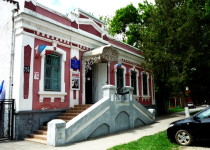
  Slavonic Museum of Local History
- Slavonic Museum of Nature MUK
- Dormition Cathedral (1907), designed by the famous architect of the Kuban Kosyakin
- Monument to A.V. Suvorov
- Walk of fame
- A Monument to Taman participants march of the Red Army

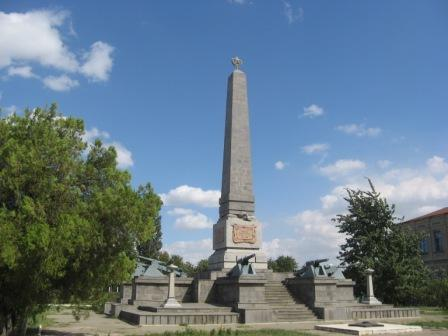
A Monument to Taman participants march of the Red Army

== Education ==
There are 91 educational institutions, including schools - 50

- The branch of the Kuban State University
- Slavonic Agricultural College
- Professional school No. 45
- Professional school No. 20
- Slavonic branch of the Novorossiysk College of Medicine
- Slavonic branch of the College of Technology, Economics and Law named after AA Vyazemsky
- Branch of Moscow State University of Technology and management. K. Razumovsky
- Branch of Moscow State Technological Academy
- Anapa Branch Industrial Technical

== The festival of Slavonic Culture ==
The Day of Slavic Writing and Culture is a holiday on the Slavonic calendar in which Slavonic people coming from several different parts of Russia will gather to share their culture through food, art, and music. The organizers are the Federal Agency for Culture and Cinematography of the Ministry of Culture and Mass Communications of the Russian Federation, the regional branch of the All-Russian political party "United Russia", the administration of the Krasnodar Territory, the administration of the Slavonic area. The history of the festival began in 2004, when the provincial town of Slavyansk with 60-thousand population dared to conduct review of the Slavic culture of international scope. For four years, the festival has gained popularity is constantly increasing the number of participants. This year, the city once again welcomes guests from different countries to share the wealth of national cultures and feel belonging to the Slavic community. The traditional procession of delegations and the parade of brass bands, large dance of friendship and fiery extravaganza, a mini-festival "Filling an apple" on the territory of the agricultural firm "Garden-Giant" and the festival of children's groups "Joy", an entertainment program "Dancing until the morning"as well as a gala concert and a grand fireworks display in the festival program.

== Notable people ==
- Aleksey Miranchuk (1995) - footballer
- Anton Miranchuk (1995) - footballer

== Transportation ==
- Slavyansk-na-Kubani Airport
