= Akhtyrsky =

Akhtyrsky Ахтырский
- Work settlement
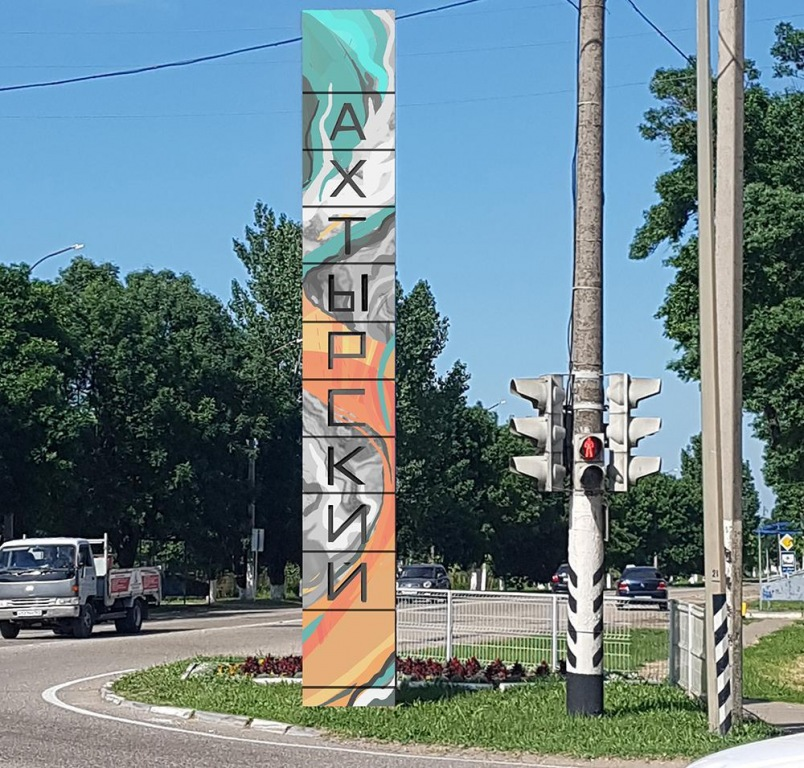

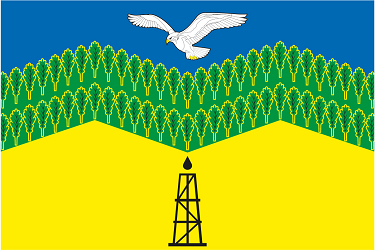
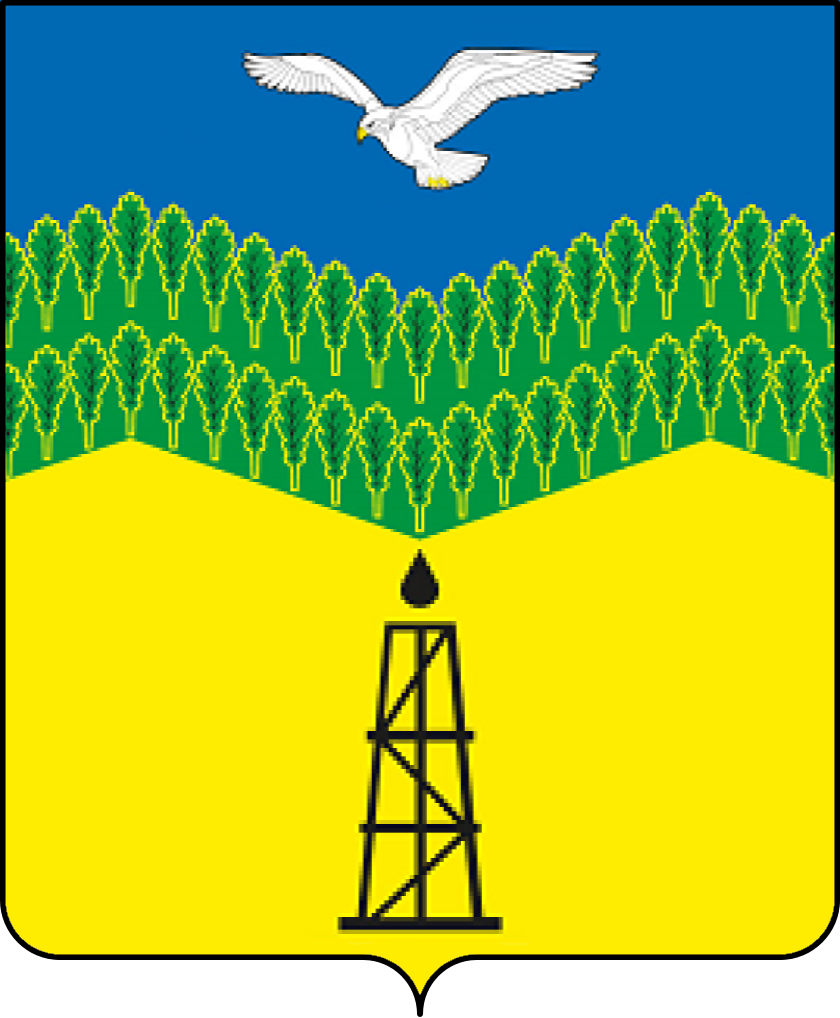
- Flag Coat of arms
- Interactive map of Akhtyrsky
- Location of Akhtyrsky Akhtyrsky (Krasnodar Krai)
- Coordinates: 44°51′00″N 38°18′01″E
- Country: Russia
- Federal subject: Krasnodar Krai
- Administrative district: Abinsky District
- Founded: 1863 (Julian)
- Elevation: 38 m (125 ft)

Population (2010 Census)
  - Total: 20,100
  - Estimate (2025): 20,875 (+3.9%)

Municipal status
  - Municipal district: Abinsky Municipal District
  - Urban settlement: Akhtyrskoye Urban Settlement
  - Capital of: Akhtyrskoye Urban Settlement
- Time zone: UTC+3 (MSK)
- Postal code: 353300–353302
- OKTMO ID: 03601153051

Akhtyrsky (Russian: Ахты́рский) is an urban locality (urban-type settlement) in Abinsky District of Krasnodar Krai, Russia, located on the Akhtyr River. Forms the municipality Akhtyrskoye urban settlement as the only settlement in its composition. Population: 20,100 (2010 census); 19,219 (2002 census); 18,568 (1989 Soviet census).

The population of the settlement is 21,270 inhabitants (2023), the second largest in the district after the city of Abinsk. As of 2002, the majority of the population is Russian (90.5%). Ukrainians, Armenians and other nationalities also live in this town.

The federal highway A146 "Krasnodar - Verkhnebakansky" passes through the urban settlement. The village has fixed railway stations Leshchenko and Akhtyrskaya, which pass through the Novorossiysk — Krasnodar line.
