= Abinsk Electric Steel Works =

Russian manufacturing business

Abinsk Electric Steel Works, Ltd.
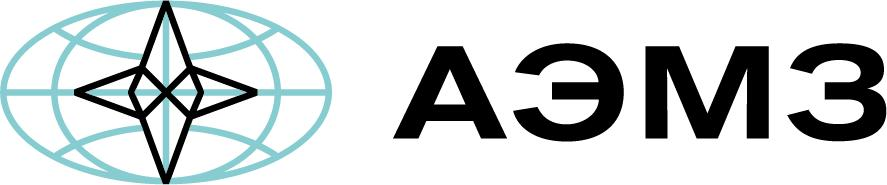
- Native name: ООО «Абинский электрометаллургический завод»
- Founded: 2006; 20 years ago
- Headquarters: Abinsk, Russia
- Products: steelmaking, rolling, hardware, oxygen, and lime production
- Number of employees: 4000
- Website: www.abinmetall.ru

Abinsk Electric Steel Works is a manufacturer of metallurgical products with production premises located in the city of Abinsk, Krasnodar Krai (Russia).

== History ==
The factory's cornerstone ceremony was held in Abinsk in 2007. The Rolling Mill was launched in July 2010. Construction of the Meltshop with an annual capacity of 1.3 million tons of metal (Stage 2) started in 2011. The project was successfully completed in 2013. At the same time, the Lime Shop was put into operation together with the Meltshop.

The launch of own oxygen production facility (in 2015) made a manufacturing complex more autonomous. The Meltshop produced their 1st million ton of steel in November 2015. The 2nd Rolling Mill was launched in May 2016. That same year, an official ceremony of laying the cornerstone of the Hardware Shop (4th stage of the factory) was held in attendance of Mr. V. I. Kondratiev, Head of the Krasnodar Krai Administration. The shop was put into operation on 20 March 2019. In 2016, there was opened a Training Center with the state license to render educational services in vocational professions. The Meltshop produced 140,224 tons of section billets in August 2018.

== Company structure ==
The factory consists of five production facilities (steelmaking, rolling, hardware, oxygen, and lime production) that are interconnected within the same technological chain. Infrastructure workshops and factory management departments are also part of the factory. The AESW Meltshop's annual output is about 1,500,000 tons of steel.

Currently, the Shop performs smelting and casting of different steel grades. The Rolling Mill production includes large and small rolled products as well as wire rods. Its annual production capacity is about 1,100 tons of rolled products. The AESW's hardware production line operates in the Steel Wire Shop with an annual production capacity of 85,000 tons of steel wire. Annual production capacity of the AESW's Oxygen Plant is 110,000 tons of liquid oxygen. In addition, the company produces liquid argon (5,600 tons per year) and nitrogen (4,500 tons per year).

== Results ==
In 2018, the Abinsk Electric Steel Works' revenue was RUB 29,39 billion. As a result, the company was ranked top 10 among the industrial companies in the Krasnodar Krai (3rd according to the RBC rating). That same year, the AESW exported nearly RUB 20 billion in goods.

In 2019, the AESW acquired the Balakovo Steel Factory from the Severstal. The said factory is located in the Saratov region, and they mainly focus on the manufacture of rebar for the construction sector, as well as on the manufacture of angle bars and channel bars.
