= Abinsk =

Town in Krasnodar Krai, Russia

Abinsk Абинск
- Town
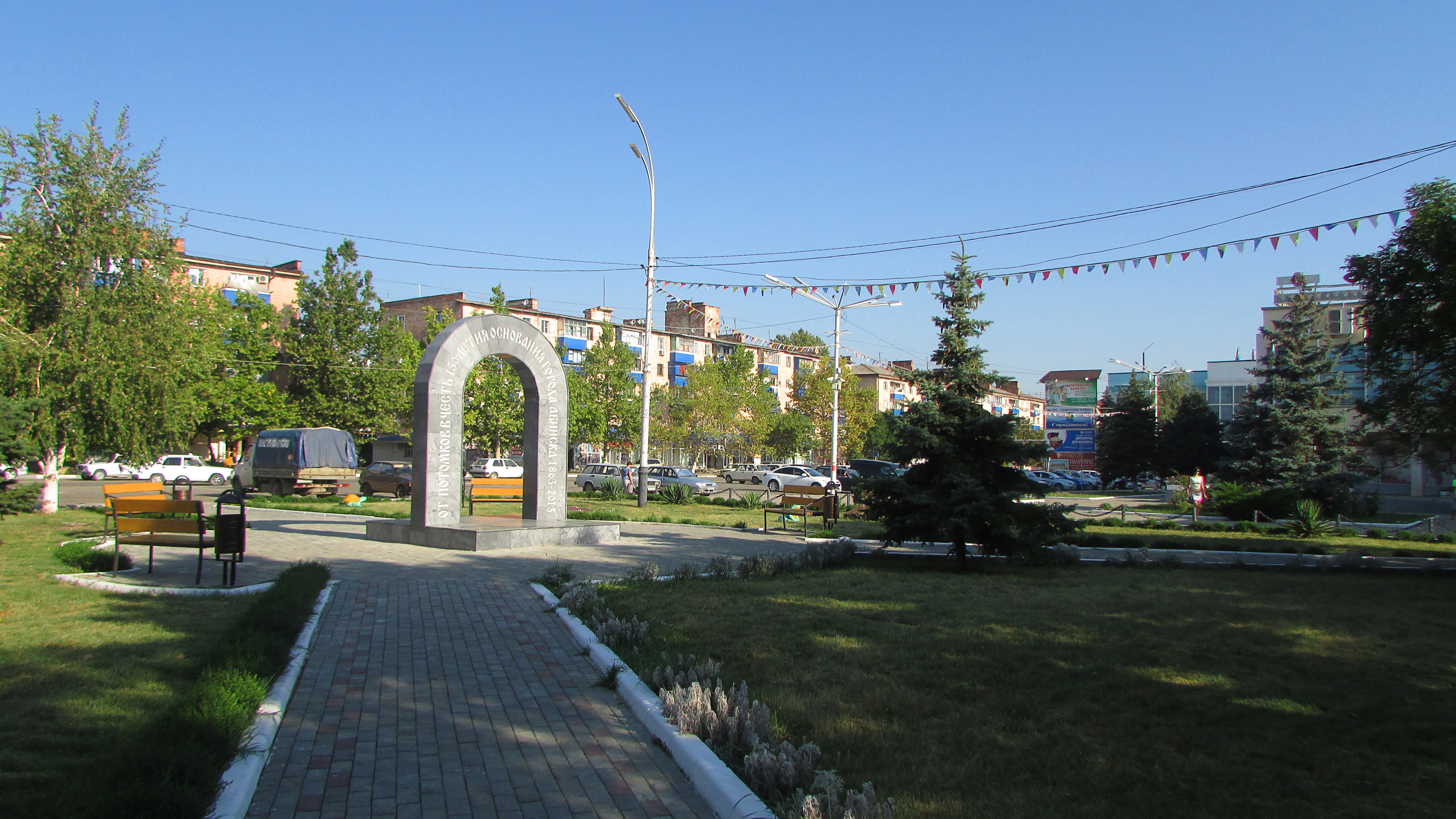
- Monument in the center of Abinsk

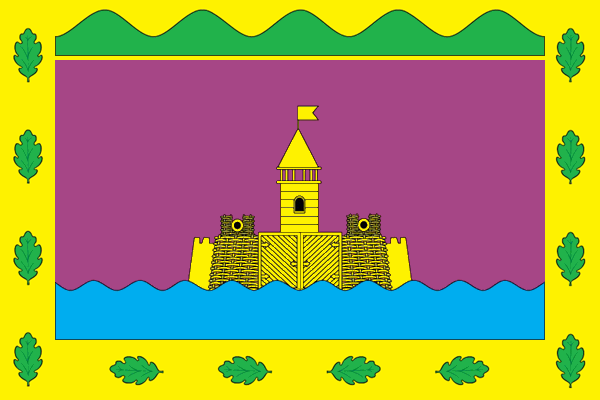
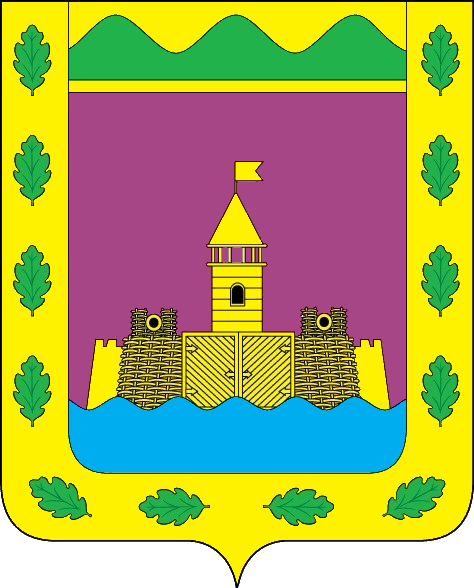
- Flag Coat of arms
- Interactive map of Abinsk
- Location of Abinsk Abinsk (Krasnodar Krai)
- Coordinates: 44°52′N 38°09′E
- Country: Russia
- Federal subject: Krasnodar Krai
- Administrative district: Abinsky District
- TownSelsoviet: Abinsk
- Founded: 1863
- Elevation: 35 m (115 ft)

Population (2010 Census)
  - Total: 34,928
  - Estimate (2025): 38,440 (+10.1%)

Administrative status
  - Capital of: Abinsky District, Town of Abinsk

Municipal status
  - Municipal district: Abinsky Municipal District
  - Urban settlement: Abinskoye Urban Settlement
  - Capital of: Abinsky Municipal District, Abinskoye Urban Settlement
- Time zone: UTC+3 (MSK)
- Postal code: 353320–353322
- OKTMO ID: 03601101001
- Website: abinskcity.ru

Abinsk (Russian: Аби́нск) is a town and the administrative center of Abinsky District of Krasnodar Krai, Russia, located 75 kilometers (47 mi) southwest of Krasnodar, the administrative center of the krai. Population: 39,058 (2020), 34,928 (2010 census); 33,734 (2002 census); 29,182 (1989 Soviet census); 23,000 (1968).

It was previously known as Abinskaya (until 1963).

== History ==
Abinsk was founded in 1836 on the site of a former Circassian settlement. The site was originally a Cossack village, which served the Russian Empire as one of the fortresses north of the Caucasus. At the same time, the settlement served as a place of exile, in particular, the Decembrists Bestuzhev, Odoevsky and Katenin were exiled here. It was known as Abinskaya (Аби́нская) before 1963.

== Administrative and municipal status ==
Within the framework of administrative divisions, Abinsk serves as the administrative center of Abinsky District. As an administrative division, it is, together with four rural localities, incorporated within Abinsky District as the Town of Abinsk. As a municipal division, the Town of Abinsk is incorporated within Abinsky Municipal District as Abinskoye Urban Settlement.
