= Slavyansky District =

Slavyansky District Славянский район (Russian)
- District
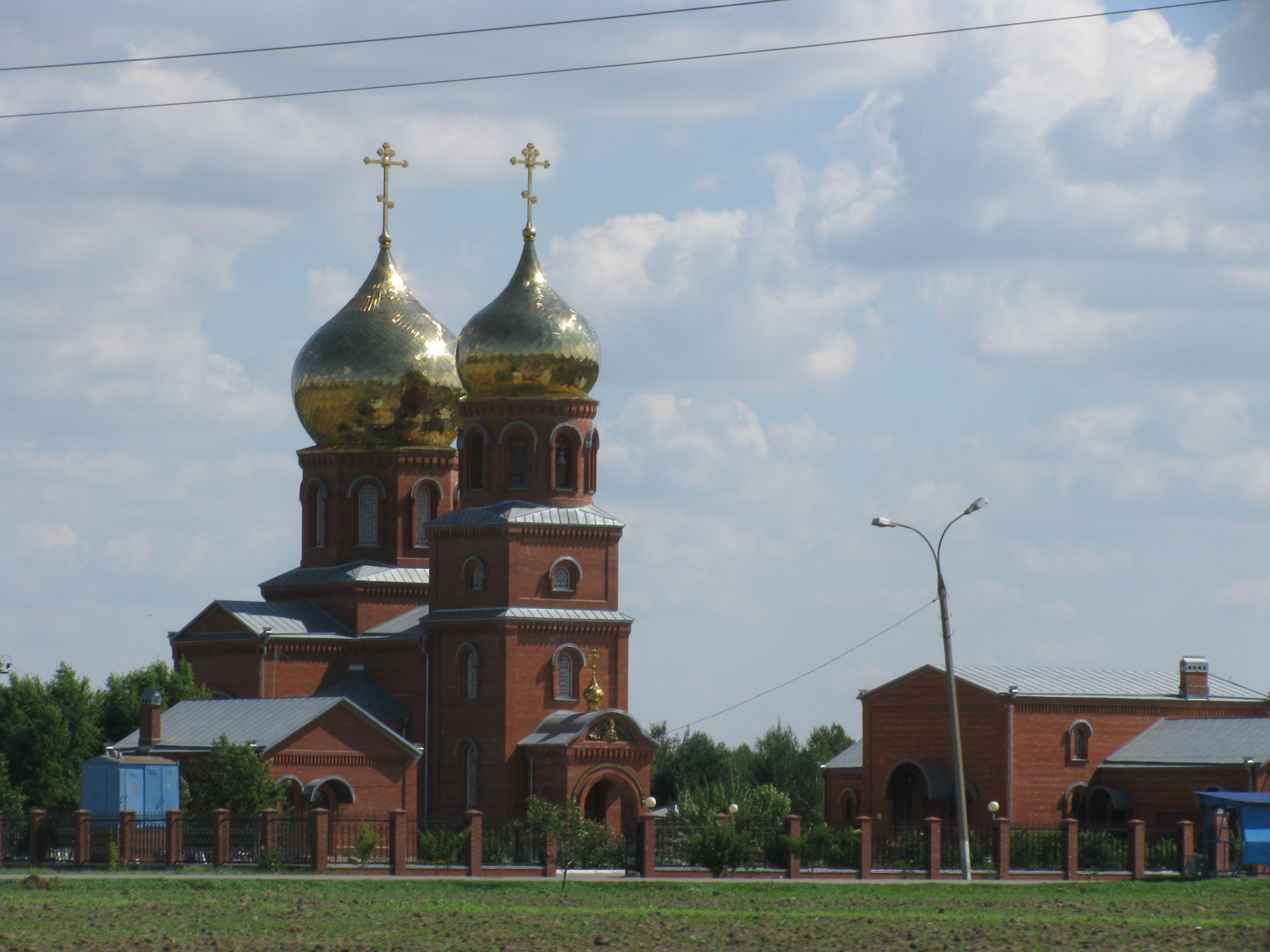
- Church of St. Panteleimon, Slavyansky District

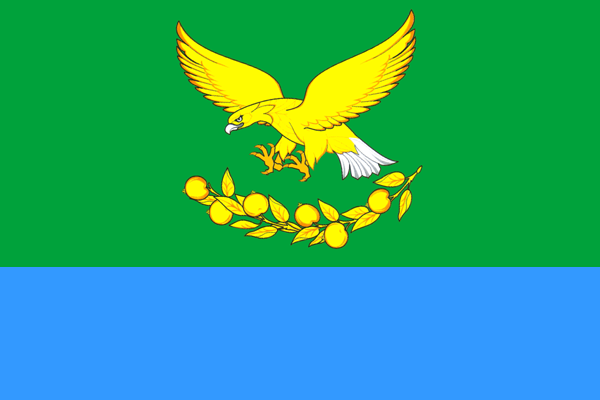
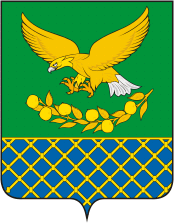
- Flag Coat of arms
- Location of Slavyansky District in Krasnodar Krai
- Coordinates: 45°30′N 37°48′E
- Country: Russia
- Federal subject: Krasnodar Krai
- Established: 2 June 1924
- Administrative center: Slavyansk-na-Kubani

Area
  - Total: 2,179 km^{2} (841 sq mi)

Population (2010 Census)
  - Total: 65,711
  - Density: 30.16/km^{2} (78.10/sq mi)
  - Urban: 0%
  - Rural: 100%

Administrative structure
  - Administrative divisions: 14 Rural okrugs
  - Inhabited localities: 44 rural localities

Municipal structure
  - Municipally incorporated as: Slavyansky Municipal District
  - Municipal divisions: 1 urban settlements, 14 rural settlements
- Time zone: UTC+3 (MSK)
- OKTMO ID: 03645000
- Website: http://slavyansk.ru/

Slavyansky District (Russian: Славя́нский райо́н) is an administrative district (raion) in Krasnodar Krai, Russia. It is located in the west of the krai. The area of the district is 2,179 square kilometers (841 sq mi). Its administrative center is the town of Slavyansk-na-Kubani (which is not administratively a part of the district).

== Administrative and municipal status ==
Within the framework of administrative divisions, Slavyansky District is one of the thirty-eight in the Krai. The town of Slavyansk-na-Kubani serves as its administrative center, despite being incorporated separately as an administrative unit with the status equal to that of the districts.

As a municipal division, the district is incorporated as Slavyansky Municipal District, with the Town of Slavyansk-na-Kubani being incorporated within it as Slavyanskoye Urban Settlement.

== Population ==
According to the 2010, the population of Slavyansky District was 65,711. The historical census for the district is as follows:

65,711 (2010 census);[3] 66,129 (2002 census);[6] 59,266 (1989 Soviet census).[7]
