= Abinsky District =

Abinsky District Абинский район (Russian)
- District
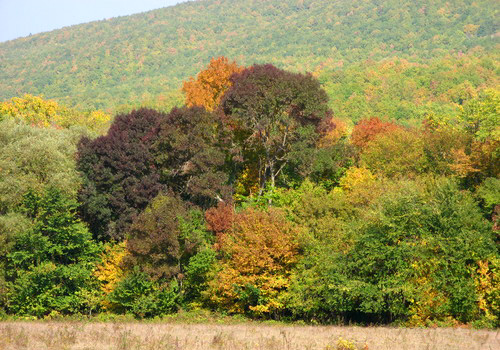
- Forest near the town of Abinsk, Abinsky District

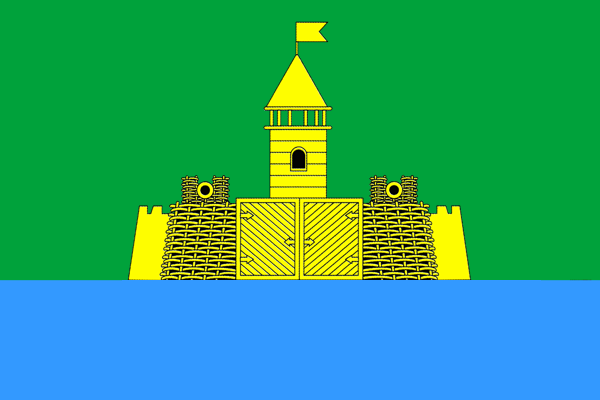
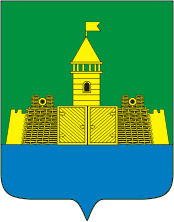
- Flag Coat of arms
- Location of Abinsky District in Krasnodar Krai
- Coordinates: 44°51′48″N 38°10′16″E
- Country: Russia
- Federal subject: Krasnodar Krai
- Established: 2 June 1924
- Administrative center: Abinsk

Area
  - Total: 1,624 km^{2} (627 sq mi)

Population (2010 Census)
  - Total: 91,909
  - Density: 56.59/km^{2} (146.6/sq mi)
  - Urban: 59.9%
  - Rural: 40.1%

Administrative structure
  - Administrative divisions: 1 Towns, 1 Settlement okrugs, 6 Rural okrugs
  - Inhabited localities: 1 cities/towns, 1 urban-type settlements, 33 rural localities

Municipal structure
  - Municipally incorporated as: Abinsky Municipal District
  - Municipal divisions: 2 urban settlements, 6 rural settlements
- Time zone: UTC+3 (MSK)
- OKTMO ID: 03601000
- Website: http://www.abinskiy.ru/

Abinsky District (Russian: Аби́нский райо́н) is an administrative district (raion), one of the thirty-eight in Krasnodar Krai, Russia. As a municipal division, it is incorporated as Abinsky Municipal District. It is located in the west of the krai. The area of the district is 1,624 square kilometers (627 sq mi). Its administrative center is the town of Abinsk. Population: 91,909 (2010 census); 89,794 (2002 census); 82,426 (1989 Soviet census). The population of Abinsk accounts for 38.0% of the district's total population.

Historical population
Year	Pop.	±%
1939	50,455	—
1959	66,498	+31.8%
1970	76,422	+14.9%
1979	78,906	+3.3%
1989	82,426	+4.5%
2002	89,794	+8.9%
2010	91,909	+2.4%
2021	98,943	+7.7%
Source: Census data
